= Constance Babington Smith =

British journalist and writer

Constance Babington Smith FRSL MBE
- Smith, seen here in 1946 being awarded the Legion of Merit by Major General Frederick Lewis Anderson, Jr.
- Born: 15 October 1912; Puttenham, Surrey, England
- Died: 31 July 2000 (aged 87); Cambridge, England
- Resting place: Cambridge City Cemetery
- Relatives: Henry Babington Smith (father); Bernard Babington Smith (brother)
- Writing career
- Pen name: Babs
- Notable awards: Fellow of the Royal Society of Literature
- Military career
- Branch: Women's Auxiliary Air Force
- Unit: Photographic Development Unit
- Conflicts: World War II
- Awards: Member of the Order of the British Empire; Defence Medal; War Medal 1939–1945; 1939–1945 Star; Legion of Merit; Mentioned in Dispatches

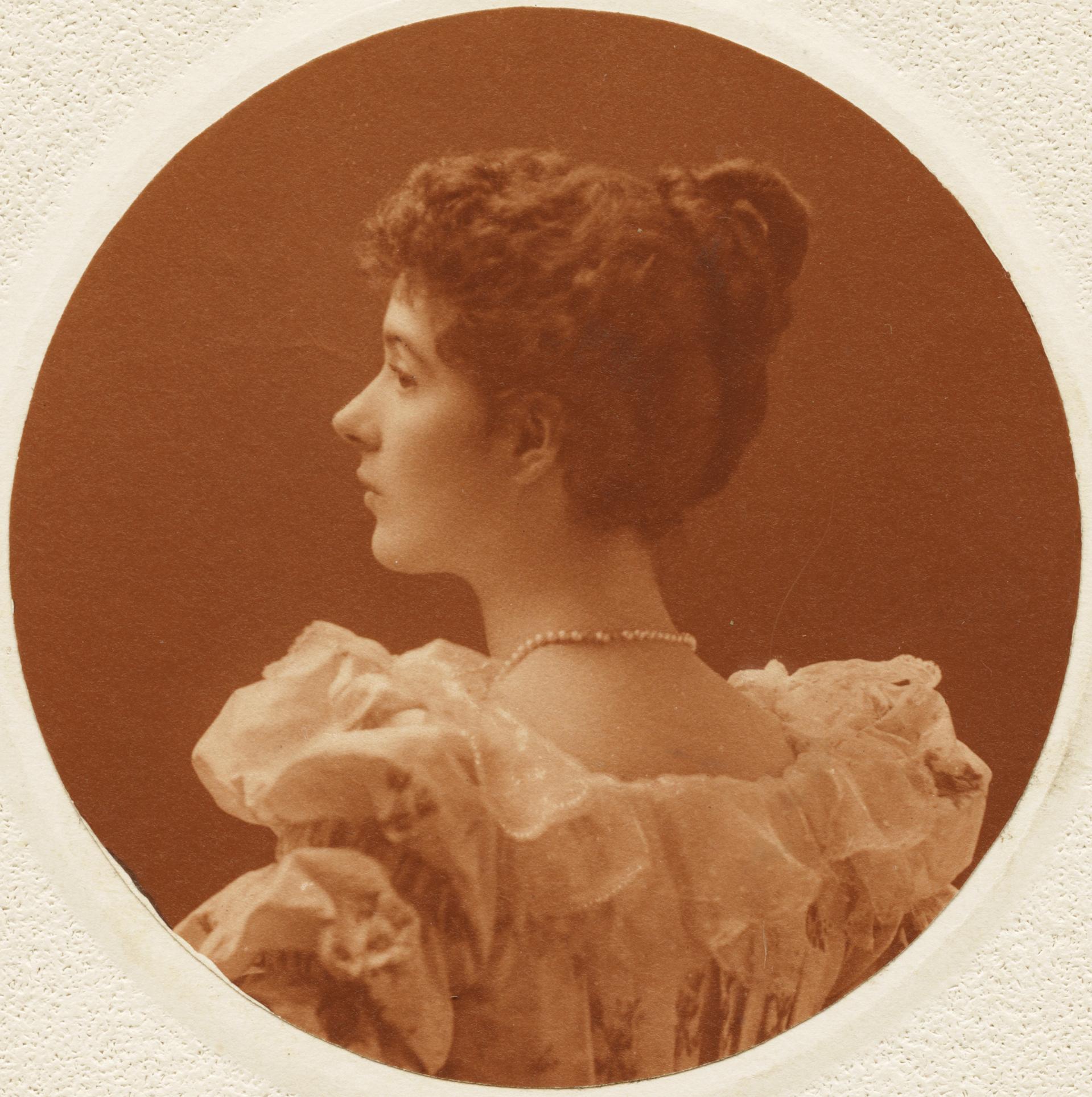
Lady Elizabeth Babington Smith

Constance Babington Smith MBE, FRSL (15 October 1912 – 31 July 2000) was a British journalist and writer, but is probably best known for her wartime work in imagery intelligence, and especially in identifying launch sites of the V-1 flying bomb.

== Early life ==
Constance Babington Smith was born on 15 October 1912 at Beech Law, Puttenham, Surrey. She was the daughter of the senior civil servant Sir Henry Babington Smith, a scion of the Babington family. Her mother, born Lady Elizabeth Bruce, was the eldest daughter of the 9th Earl of Elgin, making Constance a granddaughter of a Viceroy of India and a great-great-granddaughter of the man who bought the Elgin Marbles. Constance came from a large family and was the seventh of nine children. Her father died in 1923, when she was ten. By then, her eldest brothers were already adults, whilst her youngest sister was just two years old.

She was educated at home at the family home 'Chinthurst', in Wonersh in Surrey. She finished her education in France and moved to London in adult life. A trained milliner, she worked for the milliner Aage Thaarup before the war.

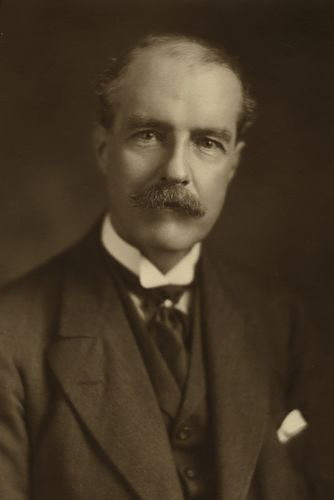
Sir Henry Babington Smith

When her mother Elizabeth became ill in the 1930s, Constance Babington Smith had to move to Weybridge to take care of her, a role often expected of the oldest unmarried daughter in a family. Brooklands aerodrome was nearby and she began to watch motor and air racing there as a distraction from her domestic duties. This stimulated an interest in aviation. On 23 December 1936 she ventured in to journalism by writing her first article as 'Babs' for The Aeroplane magazine.

== War service ==
Her knowledge of aircraft took her into the Women's Auxiliary Air Force (WAAF) and photo intelligence in the Second World War. In December 1940, Babington Smith was in the fifth group of WAAFs trained in photographic interpretation in the top secret Photographic Development Unit, qualifying alongside Eve Holiday, and Ann McKnight Kauffer (daughter of the poster artist Edward McKnight Kauffer), initially based at Paduoc House, Wembley. She later worked alongside Sarah Oliver (Winston Churchill's daughter). She wore l'Heure Bleue perfume by Guerlain whilst in uniform to retain a sense of femininity. Frank Whittle, much impressed by Babington Smith, described the effect as "air commodore's ruin".

Babington Smith had created her own reference report of Italian aircraft which had impressed her Squadron Leader. The photographic interpretation work concentrated on ships but her expertise with aeroplanes led to her being asked in early 1941 to set up an aircraft recognition section. It was unusual for a WAAF officer to head her own section without an RAF officer alongside. A colleague there, Ursula Powys-Lybbe, later wrote that "Babs had sufficient strength of character, an extraordinary singleness of purpose together with total dedication to the task, mixed in with a modicum of determination necessary to be able to assume sole command of the new section". The unit moved from London in after multiple bombings and she served with the Central Interpretation Unit (CIU) at RAF Medmenham, Buckinghamshire, reaching the rank of Flight Officer. Serving alongside was her brother, Bernard Babington Smith (1905–1993), who was also a photo interpreter (PI) at Medmenham and head of the Night Photograph Section.

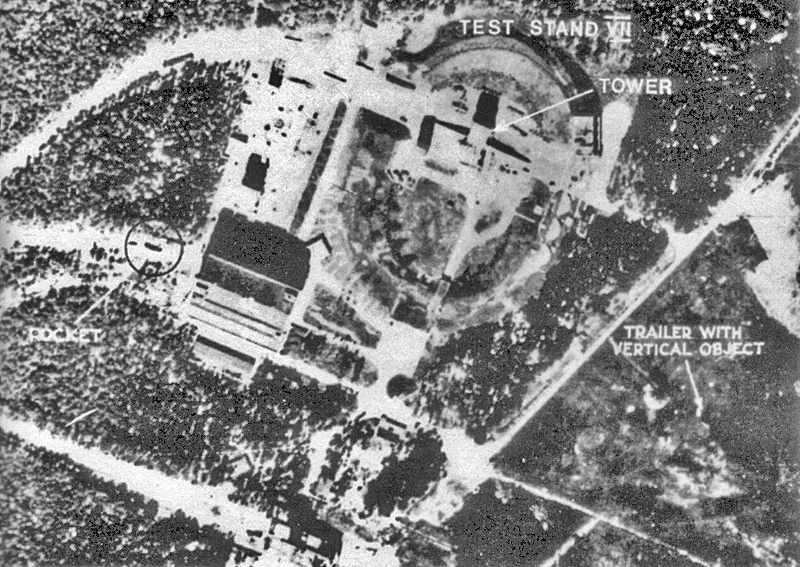
1943 RAF photo reconnaissance picture of Test Stand VII at the Peenemünde Army Research Center on the Baltic coast of Germany, a photograph of the sort that Babington Smith worked on

In 1942 she made an uncredited appearance in the Air Ministry feature film Target for Tonight, along with her fellow Medmenham colleague, Sqn Ldr Peter Riddell, and was Mentioned in Dispatches for her work.

Working on the interpretation of aerial reconnaissance photographs, Constance was credited with the discovery of the V1 at Peenemünde, Germany, making the initial identification in the summer of 1943 with full confirmation in December 1943. She challenged the preconceptions and initial dismissal of her interpretation of 'ski sites' by the Industry section at Medmenham and worked to prove that they were in fact launch ramps for the V1. 96 ramps were identified and subsequently destroyed by the Allies.

By 1944 the aircraft recognition section had eleven staff.

In April 1946 she was awarded the MBE.

After VE-Day Constance was attached to USAAF Intelligence in Washington, D.C. to continue her work on photographic interpretation, this time for the Pacific theatre.

In 1946, the United States awarded her the Legion of Merit.

== Later life ==
From 1946 to 1950 she was a researcher for Life Magazine. She later moved to Cambridge, where she converted to Greek Orthodoxy and become a writer and biographer.

Her war memoir Evidence in Camera was in 1957 the first comprehensive narrative of British photographic reconnaissance in the Second World War. Because it was published before the revelation of wartime code-breaking, this book may also have contained a measure of Cold War disinformation.

She was portrayed in the 1965 film Operation Crossbow by Sylvia Syms.

She appeared in several episodes of the 1977 BBC TV series The Secret War, where she discussed her wartime work as a photo interpreter as it related to the subject of the episode.

Babington Smith was a founder and director of the Mosquito Memorial Appeal Fund, now the de Havilland Museum Trust.

Constance Babington Smith died on 31 July 2002. Her sister Elisabeth Lloyd Jones was one of her executors.

== Publications ==
- How Photographic Detectives Solved Secret Weapons Mystery (LIFE, 28 October 1957)
- Evidence In Camera (1957) - published as Air Spy in the US
- Testing Time (1961)
- Amy Johnson (1961)
- Rose Macaulay (1972) - Macaulay was a cousin
- John Masefield; a Life (1978)
- Iulia de Beausobre (1983)
- Champion of Homeopathy: the Life of Margery Blackie (1986)

== Ancestry ==
Ancestors of Constance Babington Smith

16. Archibald Smith of Jordanhill
8. James Smith of Jordanhill
17. Isobel Euing
4. Archibald Smith
18. Alexander Wilson
9. Mary Wilson
19.
2. Sir Henry Babington Smith
20. Charles Stuart Parker
10. Sir James Parker
21. Mary Rainey
5. Susan Emma Parker
22. Thomas Babington
11. Mary Babington
23. Jean Macaulay
1. Constance Babington Smith
24. Thomas Bruce, 7th Earl of Elgin
12. James Bruce, 8th Earl of Elgin
25. Mary Nisbet
6. Victor Bruce, 9th Earl of Elgin
26. John Lambton, 1st Earl of Durham
13. Lady Mary Louisa Lambton
27. Lady Louisa Grey
3. Lady Elisabeth Mary Bruce
28. Sir James Carnegie, 5th Baronet
14. James Carnegie, 9th Earl of Southesk
29. Charlotte Lysons
7. Lady Constance Mary Carnegie
30. Charles Noel, 1st Earl of Gainsborough
15. Lady Catherine Hamilton Noel
31. Arabella Hamlyn-Williams
