= Balfour baronets =

Baronetcy in the Baronetage of the United Kingdom

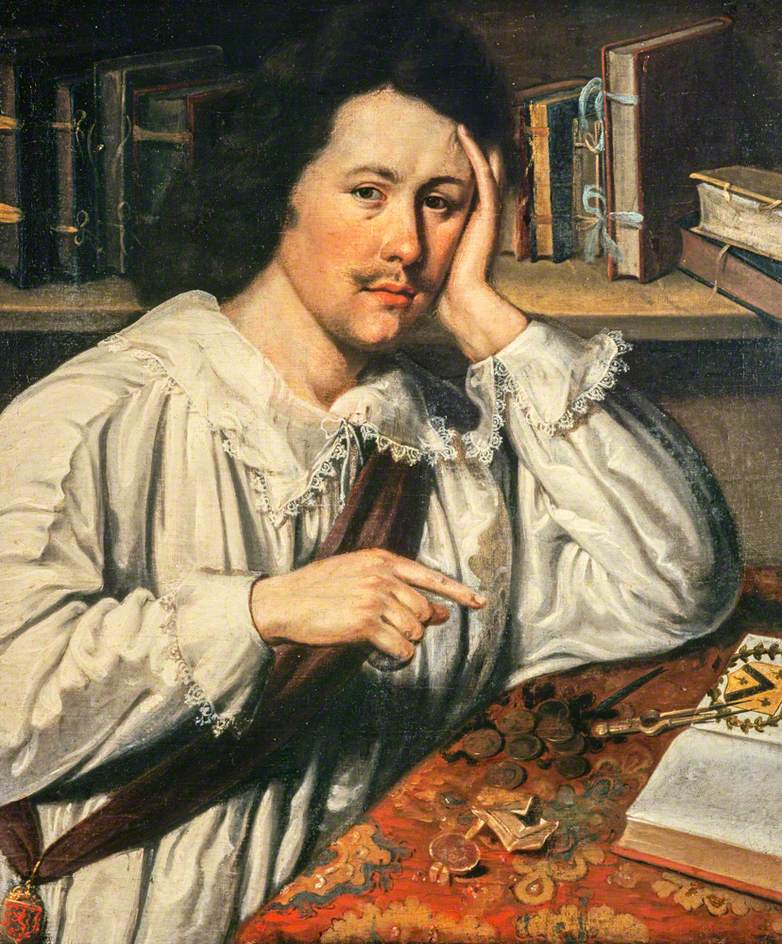
Sir James Balfour, 1st Baronet

There have been three baronetcies created for members of Clan Balfour, one in the Baronetage of Nova Scotia and two in the Baronetage of the United Kingdom. One is extant and a subsidiary title of Baron Riverdale.

The Balfour Baronetcy, of Denmiln and Kinnaird in the County of Fife, was created in the Baronetage of Nova Scotia on 22 December 1633 for James Balfour of Denmylne. He was Lord Lyon King of Arms from 1630 to 1654. The line of the first Baronet failed on the early death of his son, the second Baronet, in 1673. The late Baronet was succeeded by his uncle, the third Baronet. The title then descended from father to son until the death of the latter's great-great-grandson, the seventh Baronet, in 1773. He was succeeded by his younger brother, the eighth Baronet. When he died in 1793 the baronetcy became dormant.

The Balfour Baronetcy, of Albury Lodge in Albury in the County of Hertford, was created in the Baronetage of the United Kingdom on 3 February 1911 for Robert Balfour, Liberal Member of Parliament for Partick from 1906 to 1918, and for Glasgow Partick from 1918 to 1922. He had two sons; the title became either extinct or dormant on his death in 1929.

The Balfour Baronetcy, of Sheffield in the County of York, was created in the Baronetage of the United Kingdom on 26 June 1929 for Arthur Balfour, who was created Baron Riverdale in 1935. For more information on this creation, see the article on Baron Riverdale.

== Balfour baronets, of Denmiln and Kinnaird (1633) ==
Escutcheon of the Balfour baronets of Denmiln and Kinnaird

- Sir James Balfour, 1st Baronet (1600–1657)
- Sir Robert Balfour, 2nd Baronet (1652–1673)
- Sir Alexander Balfour, 3rd Baronet (1604–1675)
- Sir Michael Balfour, 4th Baronet (1634–1698)
- Sir Michael Balfour, 5th Baronet (1676–1709)
- Sir Michael Balfour, 6th Baronet (died 1750)
- Sir Michael Balfour, 7th Baronet (1725–1759)
- Sir John Balfour, 8th Baronet (1728–1772)
- Sir Patrick Balfour, 9th Baronet (1729–1793)

== Balfour baronets, of Albury Lodge (1911) ==
Escutcheon of the Balfour baronets of Albury Lodge

- Sir Robert Balfour, 1st Baronet (1844–1929)

== Balfour baronets, of Sheffield (1929) ==
- see the Baron Riverdale
