= List of Cambridge Apostles members =

The Cambridge Apostles, also known as Conversazione Society, is an intellectual secret society at the University of Cambridge. It was founded in 1820. The following is a list of its notable members.

Member	Election Date	College	Notability	References
Noel Annan, Baron Annan		King's	House of Lords; provost of King's College, Cambridge; British military intelligence officer; provost of University College London; and vice-chancellor of the University of London	
Ferenc Békássy	27 January 1911	King's	Poet	
Julian Bell	17 November 1928	King's	Poet	
Hugh Blackburn		Trinity	Professor of mathematics at the University of Glasgow	
George Holmes Blakesley	28 February 1868	King's	Author	
Joseph Blakesley		Trinity	Canon of Canterbury Cathedral and Dean of Lincoln	
Anthony Blunt		Trinity	Art historian and Soviet spy who was a member of the Cambridge Five	
R. B. Braithwaite	26 February 1921	King's	Philosopher and ethicist	
Rupert Brooke	25 January 1908	King's	Poet	
Oscar Browning	11 December 1858	King's	Educationalist and historian	
Charles Buller		Trinity	Member of Parliament and Judge Advocate General of the Armed Forces	
Guy Burgess		Trinity	Radio producer, British intelligence and Foreign Office officer, and Soviet spy who was a member of the Cambridge Five	
John Cairncross		Trinity	British intelligence officer and Soviet spy	
William Dougal Christie		Trinity	British diplomat, politician, and man of letters	
William Cookesley	8 November 1928	Trinity	Classical scholar, cleric, and master of Eton College	
William Johnson Cory	10 March 1844	King's	Educator and poet	
Gerald Croasdell		Pembroke	Trade unionist and general secretary of the International Federation of Actors	
Erasmus Alvey Darwin		Christ's	Brother of Charles Darwin	
Goldsworthy Lowes Dickinson	14 February 1885	King's	Historian, political philosopher, and activist	
James Hamilton Doggart		King's	Ophthalmologist, cricketer, and a member of the Bloomsbury Group	
Frederic Farrar		Trinity	Dean of Canterbury, school teacher, and author	
E. M. Forster	9 February 1901	King's	Novelist, writer, and a member of Bloomsbury Group	
Roger Fry	28 May 1887	King's	Painter and critic	
Robin Gandy		King's	Mathematician and logician	
Walford Davis Green	6 March 1905	King's	House of Commons of the United Kingdom	
Arthur Hallam		Trinity	Poet	
Thomas Oliver Harding	1872	Trinity	Senior Wrangler at Cambridge University	
G. H. Hardy		Trinity	Mathematician	
Francis Haskell		King's	Art historian	
Ralph George Hawtrey		Trinity	Economist and a member of Bloomsbury Group	
Douglas Heath		Trinity	Barrister, judge, literary editor, classical scholar, and writer	
Arthur Helps		Trinity	Writer and dean of the Privy Council	
Eric Hobsbawm	193x	King's	Academic historian and Marxist historiographer	
Alan Hodgkin	1935	Trinity	Biophysicist and co-winner of the 1963 Nobel Prize in Physiology	
F. J. A. Hort		Trinity	Anglican theologian	
George Howard	1864	Trinity	Painter and the 9th Earl of Carlisle	
Henry Jackson	1863	Trinity	Vice-master of Trinity College and Regius Professor of Greek at the University of Cambridge	
Lal Jayawardena		King's	Sri Lankan Ambassador to the European Economic Community, Belgium, Luxembourg, and the Netherlands; economist; and first director of the World Institute for Development Economics Research	
Richard Claverhouse Jebb	1859	Trinity	Classical scholar and MP for Cambridge	
John Mitchell Kemble		Trinity	Scholar and historian who made one of the first translations of Beowulf	
Benjamin Hall Kennedy		St John's	Scholar and schoolmaster	
John Maynard Keynes	28 February 1903	King's	Economist	
Henry Lintott	30 November 1929	King's	British High Commissioner to Canada	
Richard Llewelyn-Davies, Baron Llewelyn-Davies		Trinity	Architect	
D. W. Lucas	7 November 1925	King's	Classical scholar, a fellow of King's College, and cryptanalyst at Bletchley Park during World War II	
Gordon Luce		Emmanuel	Orientalist and colonial scholar in Burma	
Vernon Lushington		Trinity	Deputy Judge Advocate General and Second Secretary to the Admiralty	
Donald MacAlister	1876	St. John's	Chancellor of the University of Glasgow	
William Herrick Macaulay	20 May 1876	King's	Mathematician	
Desmond MacCarthy		Trinity	Writer and the foremost literary and dramatic critic of his day	
John Gorham Maitland		Trinity	Academic and civil servant	
Arthur Malkin	1826	Trinity	Cricketer, writer, and alpinist	
F. D. Maurice		Trinity	Anglican socialist theologian	
James Clerk Maxwell		Trinity	Physicist responsible for the classical theory of electromagnetic radiation	
Robert John Grote Mayor	2 March 1888	King's	Civil servant and educationist	
Norman McLean	1888	Christ's	Semitic and Biblical scholar	
J. M. E. McTaggart		Trinity	Metaphysician and philosopher	
Charles Merivale		St John's	Co-founder of the Oxford and Cambridge Boat Race, Chaplain to the Speaker of the House of Commons, and Dean of Ely	
Jonathan Miller		St John's	Theatre and opera director, actor, author, television presenter, and humourist	
Richard Monckton Milnes		Trinity	Poet, patron of literature, and the 1st Baron Houghton	
James Mirrlees		Trinity	British Nobel Laureate in Economic Sciences	
Robert Monteith		Trinity	Deputy Lieutenant for the County of Lanark, Scotland	
G. E. Moore		Trinity	Philosopher and one of the founders of analytic philosophy	
Sir Frederick Pollock, 3rd Baronet		Trinity	Jurist	
Dennis Proctor	22 October 1927	King's	British civil servant; Knight Commander of the Order of the Bath	
Marlborough Pryor		Trinity	Businessman	
Walter Raleigh	28 October 1882	King's	Scholar, poet, and author	
Frank Plumpton Ramsey	22 October 1921	King's	Philosopher, mathematician (Senior Wrangler), and economist	
Thomas Robinson		Trinity	Archdeacon of Madras; Lord Almoner's Professor of Arabic at the University of Cambridge; and Master of the Temple	
Victor Rothschild, 3rd Baron Rothschild		Trinity	Banker, scientist, intelligence officer, and government advisor	
Bertrand Russell		Trinity	Philosopher and logician; one of the founders of analytic philosophy	
Dadie Rylands	25 February 1922	King's	Literary scholar and theatre director	
Amartya Sen		Trinity	Economist and philosopher	
John Tresidder Sheppard	8 February 1902	King's	Classical scholar and provost of King's College, Cambridge	
Peter Shore		King's	British Labour Party politician and Cabinet minister	
Gerald Shove	30 January 1909	King's	Economist	
Henry Sidgwick		Trinity	Philosopher and economist; founder and first president of the Society for Psychical Research	
Quentin Skinner		Christ's	A founder of the Cambridge School of the history of political thought; winner of the Wolfson History Prize and the Balzan Prize	
Arthur Smith		Trinity	Archaeologist and curator of Greek and Roman Antiquities at the British Museum; director of the British School at Rome	
Henry Babington Smith		Trinity	Senior British civil servant and a director of the Bank of England	
James Parker Smith		Trinity	Barrister and politician who served as Liberal Unionist Member of Parliament for Partick	
W. J. H. Sprott		Clare	Psychologist and writer	
Edward Stanley		Trinity	Secretary of State for Foreign Affairs, Colonial Secretary, and 15th Earl of Derby	
Vincent Henry Stanton			Regius Professor of Divinity at Cambridge University	
James Kenneth Stephen	17 May 1879	King's	Poet and royal tutor	
Leslie Stephen		King's	Writer and mountaineer; father of Virginia Woolf and Vanessa Bell	
John Sterling		Trinity	Author	
Lytton Strachey		Trinity	Writer, critic, and a founding member of the Bloomsbury Group	
Michael Straight		Trinity	Magazine publisher, novelist, and Soviet spy	
Saxon Sydney-Turner	early 1900s	Trinity	British civil servant and a member of Bloomsbury Group	
Alfred, Lord Tennyson		Trinity	Poet Laureate of the United Kingdom	
George Derwent Thomson	10 November 1923	King's	Classical scholar, Marxist philosopher, and scholar of the Irish language	
George Tomlinson	1 April 1820	St John's	first Bishop of Gibraltar	
Richard Chenevix Trench		Trinity	Archbishop of Dublin, Primate of Ireland, and poet	
G. M. Trevelyan		Trinity	Chancellor of Durham University; Master and Fellow of Trinity College, Cambridge	
R. C. Trevelyan		Trinity	Poet and translator	
A. W. Verrall	1877	Trinity	Classics scholar	
Francis Warre-Cornish	c. 1860	King's	Schoolmaster, scholar, and writer	
Ronald Watkins	24 October 1925	King's	Drama teacher and director	
Alister Watson	29 January 1927	King's	Mathematician and a key member of the Cambridge Five	
Nathaniel Wedd	25 February 1888	King's	Historian and academic	
Sir Ralph Wedgwood, 1st Baronet		Trinity	Chief Officer of the London and North Eastern Railway and chairman of the Railway Executive Committee	
James Welldon	6 February 1875	King's	Clergyman and scholar	
Brooke Foss Westcott		Trinity	Bishop of Durham, scholar, and theologian	
Alfred North Whitehead	17 May 1884	Trinity	Mathematician and philosopher	
Ludwig Wittgenstein		Trinity	Philosopher and logician	
Leonard Woolf		Trinity	Author and publisher; husband of Virginia Woolf	
