= Henry Babington Smith =

British civil servant (1863–1923)

Sir Henry Babington Smith GBE CH KCB CSI
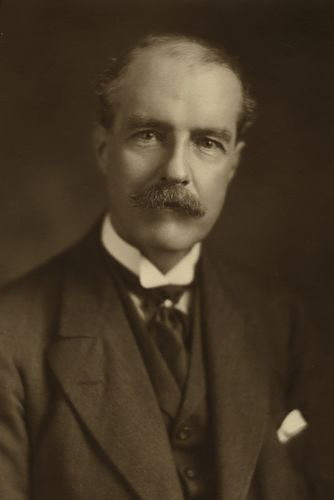
- Smith in the 1910s

President of the National Bank of Turkey
- In office 1909–1915

Secretary to the General Post Office
- In office 1903–1909

Chairman of the Ottoman Public Debt Administration
- In office 1901–1903

Personal details
- Born: 29 January 1863 Riverbank, Putney, London, England
- Died: 29 September 1923 (aged 60)
- Occupation: Civil servant

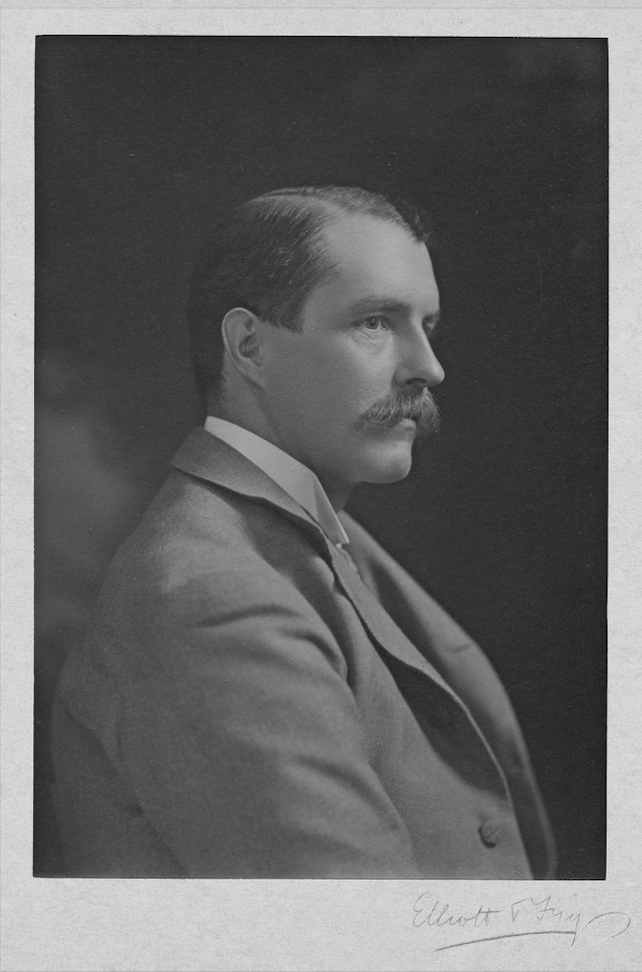
Sir Henry Babington Smith

Sir Henry Babington Smith GBE CH KCB CSI (29 January 1863 – 29 September 1923) was a senior British civil servant, who served in a wide range of posts overseas, mostly financial, before becoming a director of the Bank of England. He was related to the Babington family through his maternal grandmother Mary, a daughter of Thomas Babington, and his children took the double surname Babington Smith.

== Early life and education ==
Smith was born at Riverbank, Putney, London on 29 February 1863, the son of the lawyer and mathematician Archibald Smith. His brothers were James Parker Smith, later an MP, and Arthur Hamilton Smith, later Keeper of Greek and Roman Antiquities at the British Museum. He was educated at Eton College and Trinity College, Cambridge, where he read classics. He was a Cambridge Apostle.

== Career ==
In 1887, he joined the Board of Education as an examiner, but in 1891 became principal private secretary to the new Chancellor of the Exchequer, George Goschen.

In 1894, he became private secretary to Lord Elgin on his appointment as Viceroy of India. This relationship was cemented when he married the Viceroy's eldest daughter, Lady Elisabeth Mary Bruce (1877–1944), on 22 September 1898 in Simla. For his work in India, he was appointed Companion of the Order of the Star of India (CSI) in 1897.

He returned to Britain in 1899 and was immediately sent to Natal as HM Treasury representative in the South African War. In 1900, he became British representative on the Council of Administration of the Ottoman Public Debt, in the nominally Ottoman Egypt, becoming its chairman in 1901. In the same year, he was awarded the Osmanieh Order, Class 1. In 1903, he returned home to become secretary to the General Post Office, and was appointed Companion of the Order of the Bath (CB) in 1905 and Knight Commander of the Order of the Bath (KCB) in 1908.

In 1909, he went to Constantinople as president of the National Bank of Turkey, which he was instrumental in establishing. He turned down the post of Governor of Bombay, one of the most prestigious posts in the administration of India, because it was usually accompanied by a peerage. Smith explained to his children: "[n]o man is wise who burdens a large family with such trappings. I did without them and so can you".

The First World War saw him holding a variety of posts connected with finance, including deputy governor of the British Trade Corporation. In 1915, he participated in the Anglo-French Financial Commission to the United States. The same year he was appointed as chairman of a Royal Commission looking at the process of making appointments within the Civil Service. He was appointed to the Order of the Companions of Honour (CH) in 1917. In 1918, he accompanied Lord Reading to the United States as assistant commissioner and minister plenipotentiary.

After the war, he chaired the Indian Finance and Currency Committee in 1919 and the Railway Amalgamation Tribunal in 1921. He was appointed a director of the Bank of England in 1920.

Smith was appointed Knight Grand Cross of the Order of the British Empire (GBE) in the 1920 civilian war honours for his services in the United States.

== Family ==
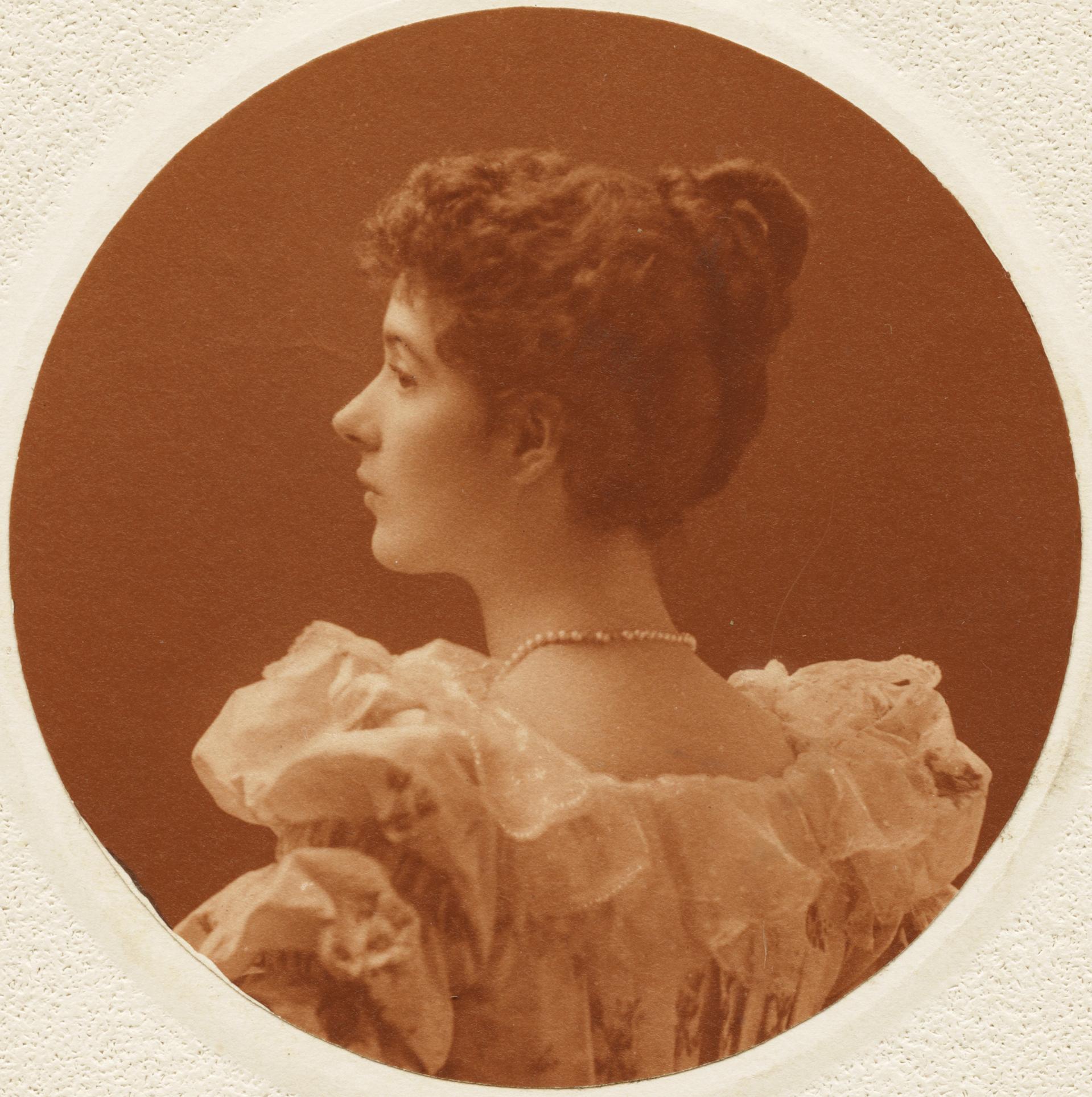
Lady Elizabeth Mary Bruce (later Babington Smith).Simla.1898

Babington Smith married Lady Elizabeth Bruce (1877–1944), the eldest daughter of Victor Bruce, 9th Earl of Elgin, the Viceroy of India. They had four sons and five daughters:

- Michael Babington Smith (1901–1984): Brigadier, CBE, TD
- Henry Babington Smith (1902–1982)
- Bernard Babington Smith (1905–1993): OBE
- Margaret Babington Smith 1907–1997), married Charles de Bunsen
- David Babington Smith (1909–1989)
- Lucy Babington Smith (1910–2005), married Henry Sinclair, 2nd Baron Pentland
- Constance Babington Smith (1912–2000): MBE, Legion of Merit
- Susan Babington Smith (1917–2003), married Sir Anthony Wakefield Cox
- Elizabeth Babington Smith (1921–2008): MD, FFARCS, married to Reece Lloyd-Jones

The family home was Chinthurst, in Wonersh, and later Vineyards, in Saffron Waldren.

== Ancestry ==
Ancestors of Henry Babington Smith

16. John Smith of Craigend
8. Archibald Smith of Jordanhill
17. Jane Duncan
4. James Smith of Jordanhill
18. Baillie William Euing
9. Isobel Euing
19.
2. Archibald Smith of Jordanhill
20. Alexander Wilson
10. Alexander Wilson
21.
5. Mary Wilson
22.
11.
23.
1. Sir Henry Babington Smith
24.
12. Charles Stuart Parker
25.
6. Sir James Parker
26.
13. Mary Rainey
27.
3. Susan Emma Parker
28. Thomas Babington of Rothley Temple
14. Thomas Babington of Rothley Temple
29. Lydia Cardale
7. Mary Babington
30. Rev. John Macaulay
15. Jean Macaulay
31. Margaret Campbell
