= William Smith of Carbeth Guthrie =

Scottish sugar trader who served as Lord Provost of Glasgow

William Smith of Carbeth Guthrie (1787–1871) was a 19th-century Scottish sugar trader who served as Lord Provost of Glasgow from 1822 to 1824.

== Life ==
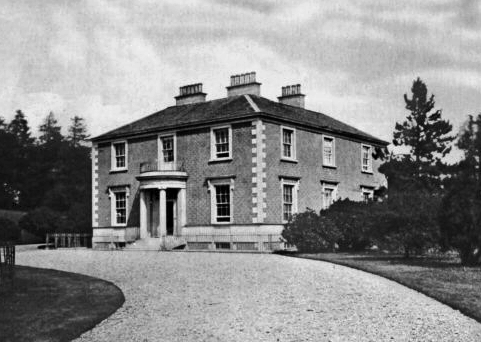
Carbeth Guthrie

He was born on 12 January 1787 on Dunlop Street in Glasgow. He was second son of Archibald Smith of Jordanhill (1749–1821) near Glasgow, and his wife, Isabella Euing (1755–1855). His brothers were Archibald Smith and James Smith of Jordanhill.

He served as Dean of Guild to Glasgow City Council in 1821 and as Lord Provost 1822 to 1824.

He was a partner in the sugar trading firm of Smith & Brown who owned the Jordanhill sugar plantation o the Naparima Plain on Trinidad in the West Indies. He also owned the Wotten Waven estate on Dominica. When Britain abolished slavery in is colonies he received two-thirds of the compensation for the Jordanhill estate (Brown receiving one third). He purchased the estate of Carbeth in 1834 from his cousin John Guthrie and renamed it "Carbeth Guthrie". It laid in his family's ancestral home of Strathblane.

He sold the Carbeth house to Rev. John C. C. Smith of Ceres in 1861.

When he died in 1871, he left £4639.

== Family ==
He married twice: first in 1810 to Jane Cuningham. His children included Archibald who became Sheriff-Substitute of Lanarkshire, and Cuningham Smith, with his first wife. In 1829 he married Sarah Wallis (1797-1877), and their children included: Rev Dr Henry Wallis Smith DD (minister of Kirknewton, West Lothian), Jane Cuningham Smith (married John Macredie of Perceton), Helen Catherine Smith (died unmarried), John Guthrie Smith (of Mugdock Castle), Major William Smith RA, and James George Smith (of Bombay and Liverpool).

He was uncle to Archibald Smith of Jordanhill. His cousin was William Euing.
