= Doolittle Report =

There have been several Doolittle Reports:

- The Doolittle report of 1867: Condition of the Indian Tribes: Report of the Joint Special Committee Appointed Under Joint Resolution of March 3, 1865. The chairman of the committee was Senator James Rood Doolittle, U.S. Senator from Wisconsin.
- A report by Jimmy Doolittle on the Doolittle Raid on Tokyo Halsey-Doolittle Raid, April 1942.
- A classified report by Jimmy Doolittle to U.S. President Dwight Eisenhower regarding the CIA's Directorate of Plans that had responsibility for both clandestine intelligence collection and covert operations. Declassified in 1976, this report is generally called the Doolittle Report, 1954.
