= 1890 Partick by-election =

UK parliamentary by-election

The 1890 Partick by-election was a parliamentary by-election held in Scotland on 11 February 1890 for the British House of Commons constituency of Partick. It was caused by the death of the constituency's sitting Liberal Unionist Member of Parliament (MP) Alexander Craig Sellar, who had held the seat since the 1885 general election. He had been elected as a Liberal in 1885, but joined the breakaway Liberal Unionists in 1886, and was re-elected at the election of 1886 as a Liberal Unionist.

General election 1886: Partick
Party	Candidate	Votes	%	±%
Liberal Unionist	Alexander Craig Sellar	3,745	56.0	+7.9
Liberal	Robert Allan McLean	2,944	44.0	−7.9
Majority		801	12.0	N/A
Turnout		6,689	74.8	−5.5
Liberal Unionist gain from Liberal		Swing	+8.4	

== Result ==
The seat was held for the Liberal Unionists by James Parker Smith;

Partick by-election, 1890
Party	Candidate	Votes	%	±%
Liberal Unionist	James Parker Smith	4,148	51.4	−4.6
Liberal	Charles Tennant	3,929	48.6	+4.6
Majority		219	2.8	−9.2
Turnout		8,077	85.7	+10.9
Liberal Unionist hold		Swing	-4.6	

== Aftermath ==
General election 1892: Partick
Party	Candidate	Votes	%	±%
Liberal Unionist	James Parker Smith	5,005	53.9	−2.1
Liberal	Edward Tennant	4,278	46.1	+2.1
Majority		727	7.8	−4.2
Turnout		9,283	81.1	+6.3
Liberal Unionist hold		Swing	-2.1	
