= James Parker (rower) =

English rower

James Edward Parker (born 8 September 1842) was an English rower who won several events at Henley Royal Regatta and won the Wingfield Sculls, the amateur sculling championship of the River Thames.

Parker was born at Rothley, Leicestershire the third son of James Parker and his wife Mary Babbington. His father was a barrister and Vice-Chancellor of the High Court and his mother the daughter of Thomas Babington. Parker was educated at University College, Oxford. While at Oxford, he was an active rower. In 1862, he was a member of the winning University College crew in the Ladies' Challenge Plate at Henley Royal Regatta. He also competed in the Wingfield Sculls but was runner-up to Walter Bradford Woodgate. In 1863 he was in the University College crews which won the Grand Challenge Cup and the Stewards' Challenge Cup but he never rowed in the Oxford eight. In 1863, as a sculler he won the OUBC sculls and the Wingfield Sculls - the latter being a row-over because Woodgate had an injured neck.
