= Vernon O. Johnson =

American diplomat

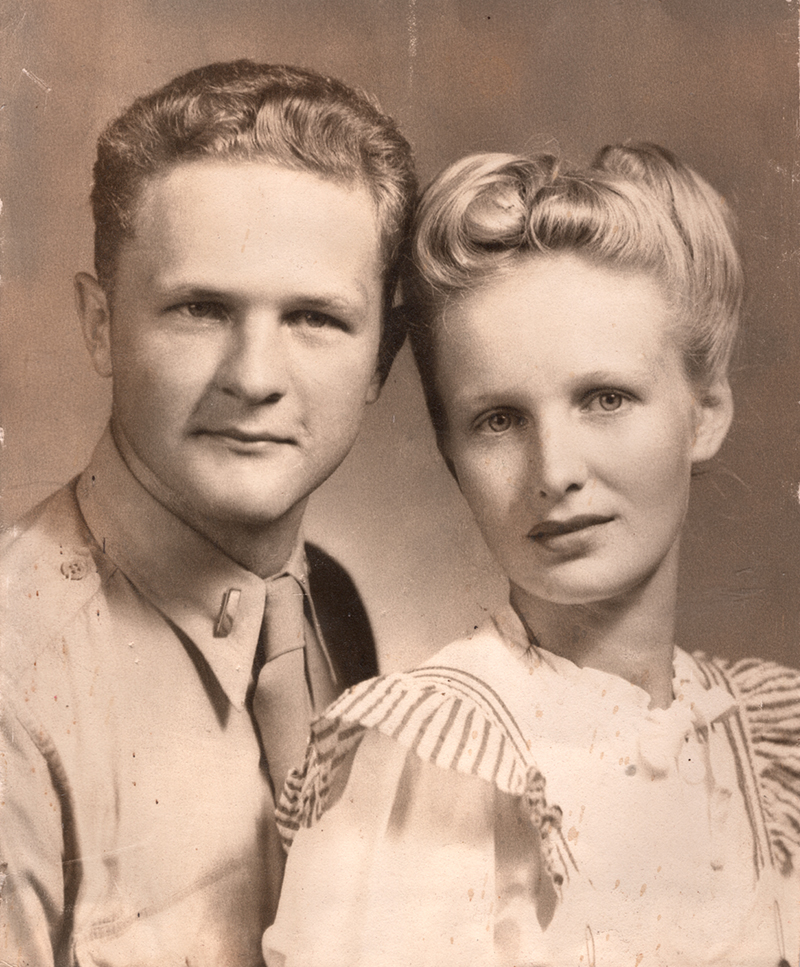
Vernon and Anne Johnson portrait in 1942.

Vernon Oliver Johnson (July 21, 1920 – September 1, 1987) was an American diplomat. After losing his crew in a B17-bomber crash and spending 18 months in V.A. hospitals, Johnson dedicated himself to solving global political tensions via face-to-face dialogue. During the height of the Cold War, he traveled the world for 20 months with his wife, Anne Beckwith (Miller) Johnson and their eight children, promoting peace and world diplomacy through personal interaction.

== Early life ==
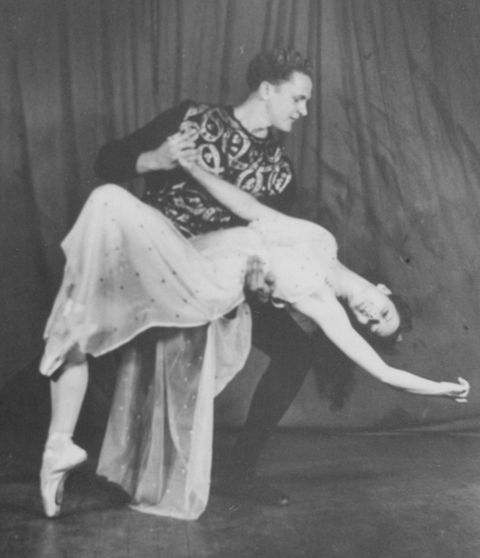
Vernon as King Arthur, Marion Morris as Venus in the 1941 Production of "The Sorcerer" on stage at the Lobero Theater, Santa Barbara, CA

Vernon Johnson was born July 21, 1920, in Spring Valley, Illinois. In 1932, the family moved to Los Angeles, California, then to Santa Barbara in 1935. He graduated from Santa Barbara High School in 1937 and entered Santa Barbara State College (later to become UCSB) with a dual major in economics and political science. He was in the National Guard from 1938 to 1940. Johnson was performing onstage at the Lobero Theater on December 7, 1941, when news came of the Pearl Harbor bombing. The following March he married Anne Beckwith Miller, in June graduated with a degree in economics, and in July joined the Army Air Corps.

== World War II and military life ==
=== Cadet and flight school ===
Johnson was called to duty on February 5, 1943. He reported to Squadron 13 at the Santa Ana Army Air Base for testing followed by Boeing B-17 Flying Fortress pilot training at the Marfa Army Airfield and was subsequently assigned to the 15th Expeditionary Mobility Task Force, 32nd Squadron, 301st Operations Group.

=== Combat ===
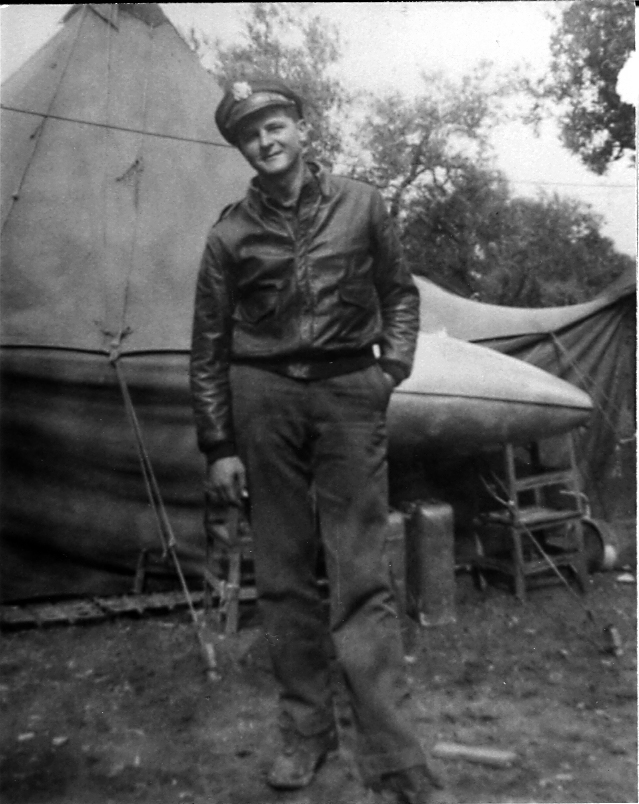
Photograph of 1st Lieut. Vernon O. Johnson at Foggia Air Force Complex in Italy, October 1944. Army Air Corps photograph

After a brief assignment in Morocco, 1st Lieut. Johnson was based at the Foggia Airfield Complex in Italy where he piloted 26 bombing raids on military installations in Germany, Czechoslovakia, and Austria occasionally accompanied by the Tuskegee Airmen, a component of the 301st Bomb Group. On November 25, 1944, he piloted "secret and confidential [radar] equipment" on an experimental run.

Declassified crash report 15971 describing the B-17 Flying Fortress crash on November 25, 1944. 11-page pdf document.

During the mission, engine fire caused them to return to Foggia. Unable to land at Foggia, they were diverted to Iesi which resulted in the plane crashing and exploding. Seven crewmen died, and Johnson suffered major injury including dislocated hips, broken ankles and a broken arm. Flight Sergeant E.J. White, a witness from the South African Air Force on duty at the runway, reported "...the crash was undoubtedly attributable to the negligence on the part of the South African Air Force authorities in failing to lay a flare path for the emergency landing." (See linked image to right of Report of Airport Accident declassified September 10, 1982). Johnson was taken to a nearby Canadian hospital in a monastery for a five-week recovery from extensive burns, then spent 18 months in a Veterans Administration hospital for two amputations of his left leg, reconstruction to the right ankle, and multiple skin grafts. He was promoted to captain and received the Purple Heart medal for his service.

== Post-war life ==
Johnson enrolled in the American Institute of Foreign Trade School (now Thunderbird School of Global Management) in 1948. The school focused on World Diplomacy and Global Economics. The following year, he was accepted in a graduate program at the University of Guadalajara, Mexico to study economics, foreign affairs, and law. Returning to Santa Barbara following graduate school, he became a businessman and real estate investor. In 1959, he bought a 1947 Ford bus that had been retired by the City of Santa Barbara and converted to a mobile home.

== Two-year journey opens Trans-Siberian Railway to tourists ==
By the mid-1950s, anti-Communist influence of Senator Joe McCarthy, aided by the House Un-American Activities Committee led to the establishment of the Doolittle Report. In September 1959, when Russian Premier Nikita Khrushchev was denied permission to visit Disneyland during his U.S. tour he was angry. Headlines read "K Blows Top". On the train ride from Los Angeles to San Francisco, Khrushchev was not interested in visiting with other dignitaries. Public relations had a planned stop for him to shake hands with the mayor in Santa Barbara. Johnson, his wife, and eight children were at the train station to greet the world leader. Khrushchev looked out the train window, had eye contact with Johnson then stood, walked to the front of the train, disembarked and shook hands with the mayor, then walked 40–50 yards back to shake Johnson's hand and said (via interpreter), "You have a nice face". Johnson replied that he would take his family to Russia; Khrushchev said Russia would welcome them. The Times of London headline reported "All Change In Santa Barbara".

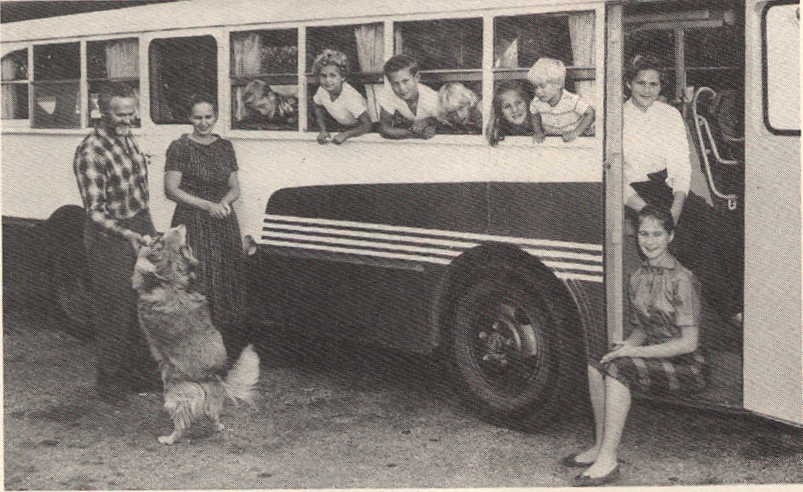
Photograph of the Vernon Johnson Family with the 1947 Ford bus that they drove around the world, 1960–1961.

On March 3, 1960, Vernon, Anne, and his eight children began a 20-month world journey as an education in foreign affairs that Vernon asserted could not be learned in public schools. Time-Life offered cameras, film and money to cover the trip, all refused by Johnson who sought independence abroad.

They left New York on the Italian liner, the MS Vulcania to Venice. The bus went to Amsterdam, and as Johnson went north to retrieve it, the family lived in a brothel in Verona awaiting his return. From Verona they visited the site of his B17 crash before heading to Naples where their luggage from the Vulcania had been dropped.

In Rome, the "Daily American" wrote "Vernon Johnson…is threatening to set the well-planned travel tour back 50 years" and quoted Johnson with saying that with the US/USSR summit in Paris derailed by 1960 U-2 incident, "I was tempted to send [Khrushchev] a cable telling him to quit lousing up our trip". That attracted the attention of Anita Ekberg of La Dolce Vita-fame, and prompted her to escort the family for a week in Rome, She, her Italian actor boyfriend Franco Silva, her producer, secretary, and others painted 4-foot long permanent autographs on the side of the bus, creating a traveling autograph album for the next 17 months.

From Rome they went to France, Belgium, Netherlands, Germany, Denmark, Sweden, Finland, Russia, Siberia, and Japan detailed in the book Home is Where the Bus Is, written by his wife, Anne Beckwith Johnson. From April 1960 until April 1961 Johnson appealed to every Russian embassy he visited for a two-month visa into Russia plus permission to cross Siberia. There was no road network across Siberia and the Trans-Siberian Railway had been closed to tourists since 1917. Rejected on both counts, he was offered a standard two-week visa to visit Leningrad (Now St. Petersburg) and Moscow. In May 1960, shortly before a US-USSR summit planned in Paris, the American U2 spy plane was shot down over Russia, adding tension to relations. In late April 1961, after multiple letters and visits to the Soviet Embassy in Stockholm, Russian authorities relented on visa length and issued visas to camp for two months. Once in Moscow, frequent visits to the authorities rejected any possibility of riding the Railway. On July 4, 1961, the day of the K19 Nuclear Submarine Accident, Johnson spoke again with Khrushchev at an event hosted by American Ambassador Llewellyn Thompson at the Ambassador's home in Moscow. Four days later, the Soviet Union charged Francis Gary Powers, whose U-2 spy plane was shot down over the USSR in May, with espionage. That week Johnson namedropped Khrushchev to authorities and successfully was issued a flat-car for the bus and tickets for 10 on the Railway. The only section they were not permitted to ride was the segment between Irkutsk and Khabarovsk for an undisclosed reason. A cargo plane carried them between those cities. From there they re-joined the train to Nahodka (Vladivostok was closed to travel until 1982.) From Siberia they went to Japan to visit Hiroshima 16 years after the atomic bomb was dropped. Three months later they arrived in San Francisco in November 1961, to front-page banner headlines in both the SF Chronicle and SF Examiner. Ninety miles from Santa Barbara the bus had to be towed to Santa Barbara. The trip was covered in newspapers and magazines worldwide.

== Post-trip: 1962–1987 ==
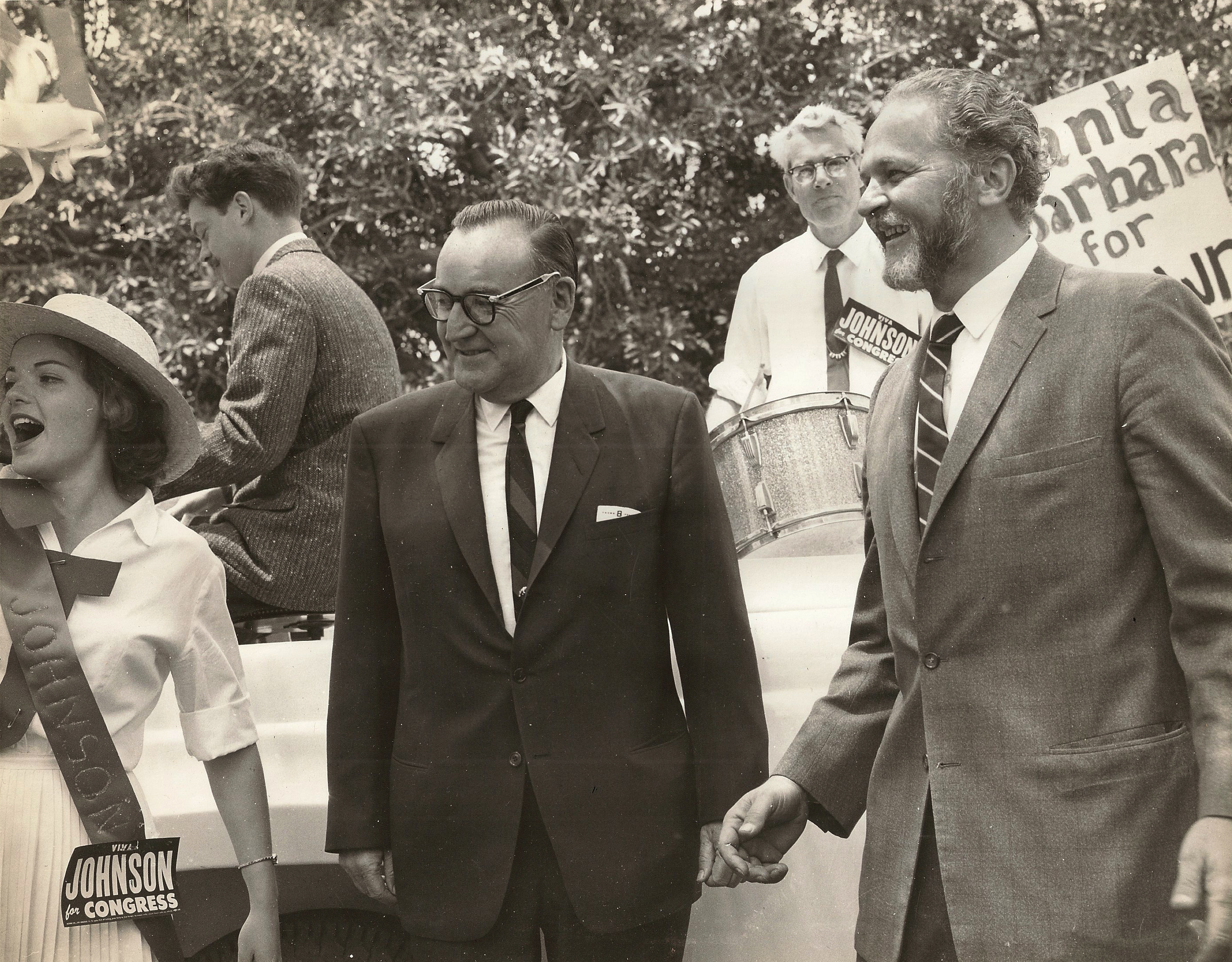
Vernon O. Johnson and then-Governor Pat Brown (California) at a political rally in Santa Barbara, Summer 1962. Eric Mauer’s Dixieland band plays in background.

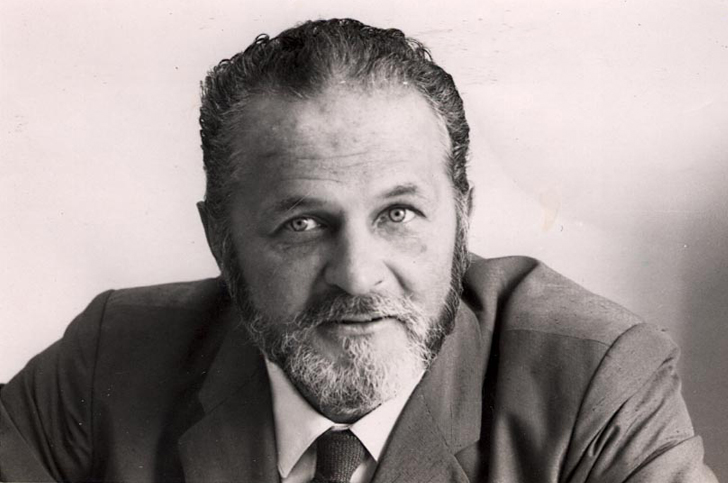
Portrait of businessman Vernon O. Johnson in 1961.

In May 1962, believing that US foreign policy was not promoting the world collaboration, Johnson entered the Congressional race in Santa Barbara and Ventura Counties. He believed that America was "the light of the world…the country that had the world in its hands". Stating "We have a young and vigorous president {John F. Kennedy} who is ready to give us a first-class administration. We are held back by a Congress that suffers from a plague of backward men who vote in a block…During the next few months I am going to prove to you that [opponent] must be replaced for the good of the nation." He lost in the primaries.

In 1964, Johnson purchased the Oaks Hotel in Ojai, CA with a vision of creating an artist retreat and family-like setting for teenagers. He hired a chef from the Queen Mary cruise ship, began a Sunday art show on the parking lot, hired Doodles Weaver to entertain, and brought Richard Hittleman to teach a yoga class. Unfortunately, the hotel went bankrupt before the vision could be accomplished. Johnson sold all of his properties to pay off most of his debts, and became a stay-at-home father.

In 1965, William Weatherford, an Episcopal minister, and Johnson joined Martin Luther King for the March on Selma.

In 1966, Johnson began a short-lived "Utopian Community" on a large tract of land on Hollister Ranch between Refugio and Gaviota.

In January 1968, he announced his candidacy for President of the United States advocating a diversion of the $76 billion defense budget to finance the building of 76 new cities throughout the world as a positive approach to the world's needs for proper food, housing, education, and basic necessities. A vocal critic of the US involvement in Vietnam, he became increasingly concerned with the US role in economic-infrastructure destabilization of other countries.

In 1979, during the Nicaraguan Revolution, Johnson went with a Red Cross team to bring medical supplies following the civil war. He returned again in 1983 with a group of journalists.

In January 1980, during the Iran hostage crisis, Johnson traveled to Turkey requesting the Iranian embassy allow him to enter Iran to affect the release of the 52 American diplomats and citizens that had been held hostage for two months. News headlines when he arrived in Turkey included "U.S. Troop Plan for Iran Revealed (25,000 in 16 days)". After a month of appeals the Embassy would only give him papers in Turkish with no translation. He turned away from his goal. The hostages were released 11 months later on January 20, 1981.

Johnson died September 1, 1987, in Santa Barbara, California.
