= James Parker Smith =

British politician

James Parker Smith of Jordanhill, PC, JP, DL, FRSE (30 August 1854 – 30 April 1929) was a Scottish barrister and politician who served as Liberal Unionist MP for Partick. He was first elected at a by-election in 1890 but lost the seat in 1906. He was a Cambridge Apostle.

He had previously contested Greenock and Paisley.

== Life ==
He was born on 30 August 1854 the son of Archibald Smith of Jordanhill (son of James Smith of Jordanhill) and his wife, Susan Emma Parker, maternal granddaughter and heiress of Thomas Babington. Although his father was Scottish he was born in London and spent much of his life in England. He was educated at Winchester College. He then studied law at Trinity College, Cambridge, graduating with a BA in Mathematics (as fourth Wrangler) in 1877 and an MA in 1880. He qualified as a barrister in 1888.

From 1890 to 1906 his interests changed from law to politics. In January 1900, Smith was appointed assistant private secretary (unpaid) to Joseph Chamberlain, Secretary of State for the Colonies. He held this post until 1903. He was sworn of the Privy Council in 1904.

In 1915 he returned to Winchester as a fellow and as warden of the college. He later became a director of the Union Bank of Scotland. In 1921 he was elected a fellow of the Royal Society of Edinburgh. His proposers were Frederick Orpen Bower, Ralph Allan Sampson, Sir Edmund Taylor Whittaker and Sir James A. Ewing.

He died at the Brooks's Club in London on 30 April 1929.

== Family ==
In 1882 he was married to Mary Louisa Hamilton. They were parents to Archibald Colin Hamilton Parker Smith, the 5th Laird of Jordanhill, and Wilmot Babington Parker Smith.

His brothers included Arthur Hamilton Smith, Henry Babington Smith, Lt Commander Charles Stewart Smith and Rev Walter Edward Smith.

== Publications ==
- Preferential Voting (1884)
- The Causes of the Union with Ireland (1887)

Parliament of the United Kingdom
Preceded by Alexander Craig Sellar	Member of Parliament for Partick; 1890–1906	Succeeded by Robert Balfour
