= Humphrey Broun Lindsay =

Major Sir George Humphrey Maurice Broun-Lindsay, DSO, JP, DL (23 October 1888 – 23 June 1964) was a British Army officer and Unionist MP for Glasgow Partick from 1924 to 1929. He was sometimes simply known as George Lindsay.

Educated at Cheltenham College and the Royal Military College, Sandhurst, he joined the King's Own Scottish Borderers in 1909. During the First World War, he served on the staff in France and Italy as brigade-major and deputy assistant adjutant and quarter master general. He was appointed a DSO and was mentioned in despatches for his service. He retired as a major.

Lindsay was later President of the Association of County Councils in Scotland and Convener of the East Lothian County Council. He was a justice of the peace for East Lothian and was appointed vice lieutenant for the county in 1949. He was knighted in 1947.

Parliament of the United Kingdom
Preceded by Andrew Young	Member of Parliament for Glasgow Partick; 1924–1929	Succeeded by Adam McKinlay
