= H. Rowan Gaither =

20th-century American attorney and businessman

Horace Rowan Gaither Jr. (1909 – April 7, 1961), was a San Francisco attorney, investment banker, and a powerful administrator at the Ford Foundation. During World War II, he served as assistant director of the Radiation Laboratory at M.I.T. In 1948, he helped found the Rand Corporation and served as a trustee until 1959.

In 1958 and 1959, he served as the first chairman of the MITRE Corporation Board of Trustees. From 1959 through his death, Gaither was a general partner and co-founder of Draper, Gaither & Anderson, one of the first venture capital firms on the west coast of the U.S., together with William H. Draper Jr., a retired Army general and Frederick L. Anderson, a retired Air Force general.

He was hired by Henry Ford II to help set the priorities of the Ford Foundation in 1947, chairing the study committee that wrote the "Report of the Study for the Ford Foundation on Policy and Program." He was later president of the Ford Foundation. He is best remembered today as the author of the controversial 1957 Gaither Report on the vulnerability of American defense. He died in 1961 of lung cancer.
