= Carbeth =

Hamlet in Stirlingshire, Scotland

Coordinates: 55°58′57″N 4°22′02″W

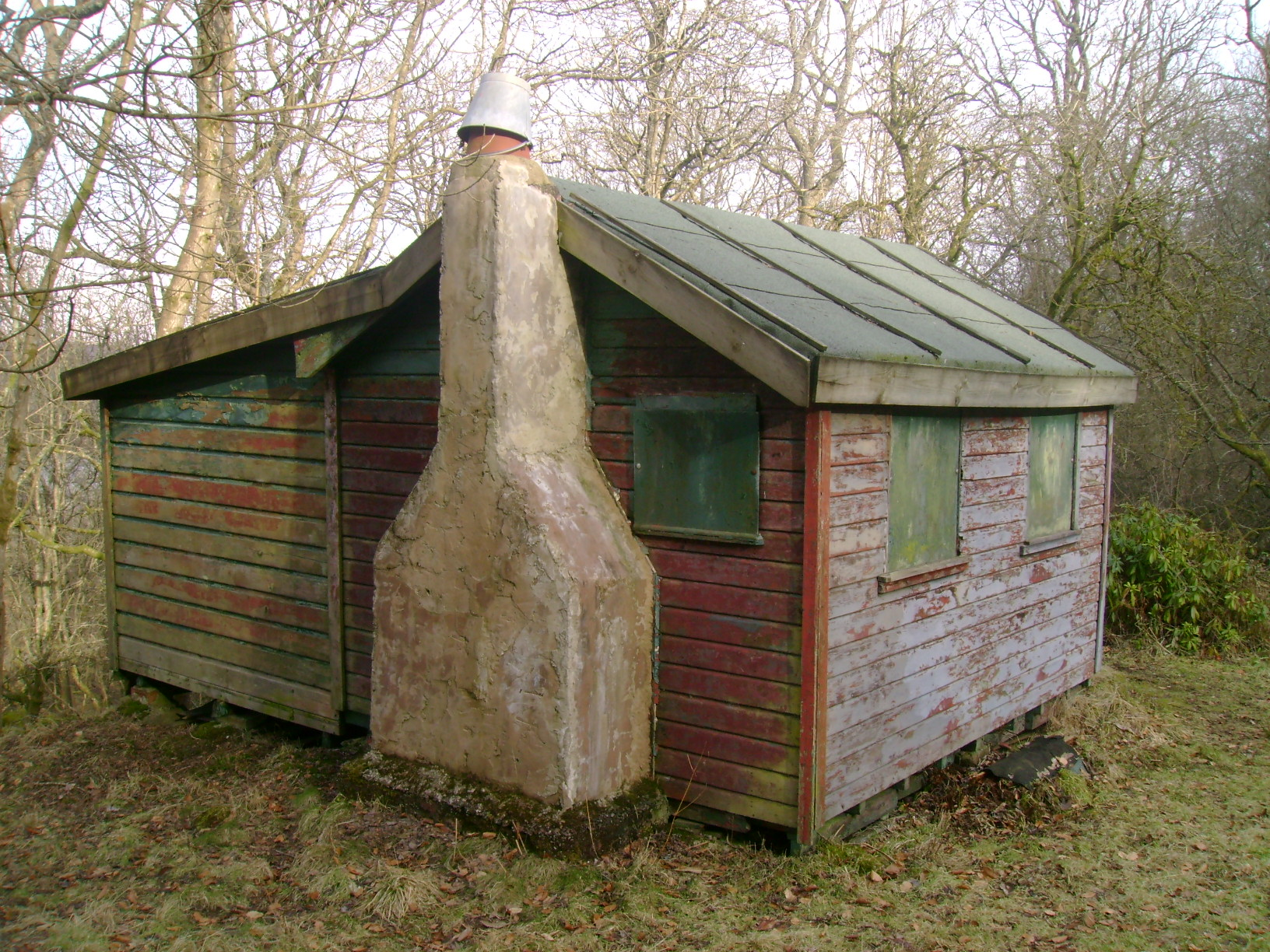
- A hut on Carbeth Hill above the loch

- Location within the Stirling council area
- OS grid reference: NS522793
- Council area: Stirling
- Lieutenancy area: Stirling and Falkirk
- Country: Scotland
- Sovereign state: United Kingdom
- Post town: GLASGOW
- Postcode district: G63
- Police: Scotland
- Fire: Scottish
- Ambulance: Scottish
- UK Parliament: Stirling and Strathallan
- Scottish Parliament: Stirling

Carbeth is a hamlet in Stirlingshire, 2 1/2 miles (4 kilometres) west of Strathblane and 5 1/2 miles (9 kilometres) north of Clydebank. Named features include Carbeth Hill, Carbeth Loch and the estate of Carbeth Guthrie. There is a community of huts here which was established in 1918 after the First World War, as a summer camp for returned soldiers.

== Famous residents ==
- William Smith of Carbeth Guthrie, Lord Provost of Glasgow 1822–24
