= William Euing =

Scottish philanthropist

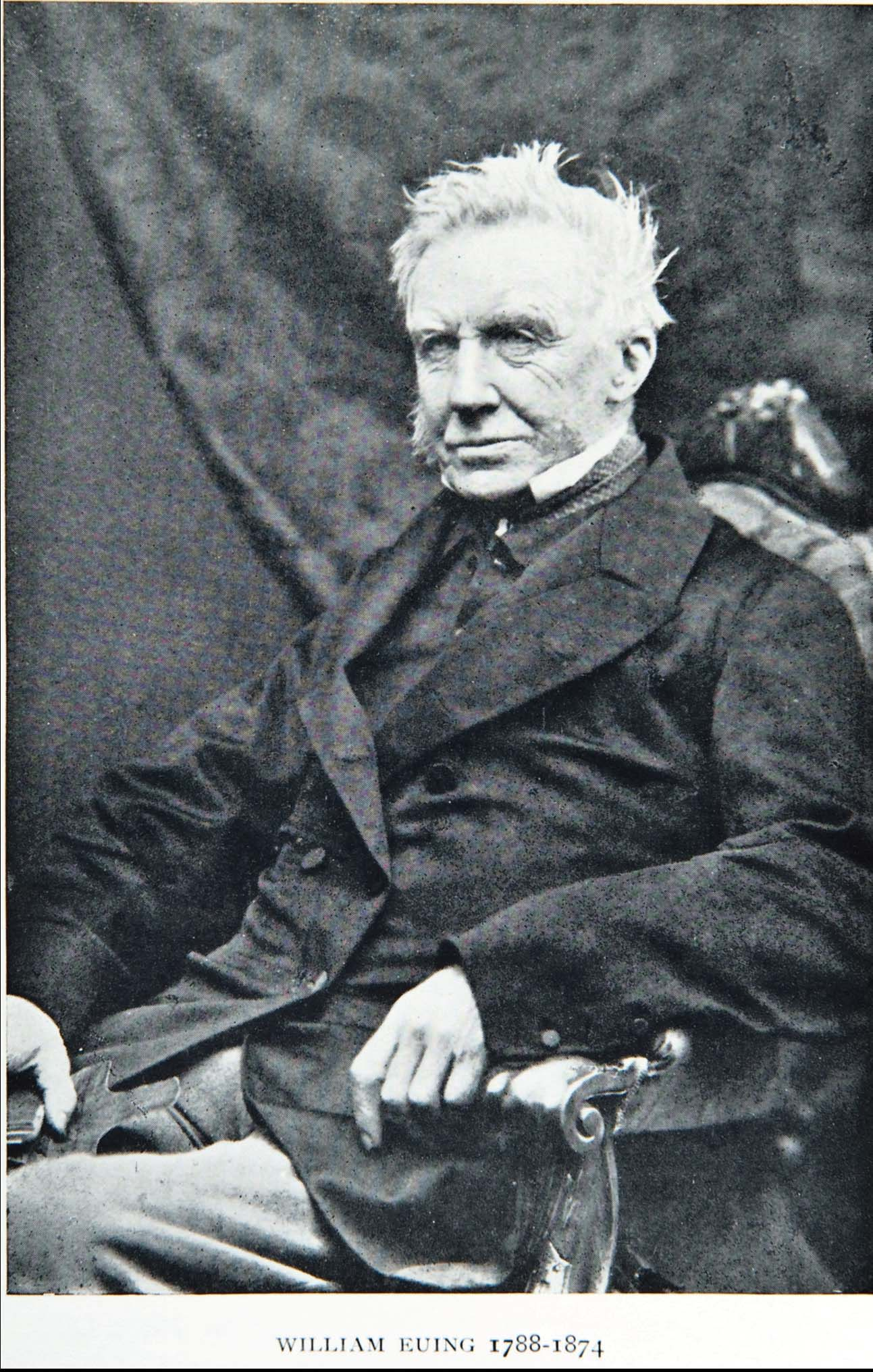
William Euing c.1860

William Euing (occasionally William Ewing) FRSE FSA (20 May 1788- 16 May 1874) was a Scottish philanthropist who left over 12,000 books to the University of Glasgow creating what is known as the Euing Collection. As an insurance broker he was founder of the Glasgow firm of William Euing & Co. He was President of the Glasgow Archaeological Society.

== Life ==
He was born on 20 May 1788 in Partick, Glasgow the son of Patrick Euing. He attended Glasgow Grammar School then Glasgow University.

He was a friend of James Orchard Halliwell who engendered in him a love of old books .In 1815 he co-founded Inglis, Euing & Co, and in 1819 created the independent company of William Euing & Co in which he was sole partner. The company offices were at the Royal Exchange. From 1832 to 1856 he managed the Association of Underwriters.

In 1865 he was elected a Fellow of the Royal Society of Edinburgh, having been proposed by his cousin, James Smith of Jordanhill.

In later life he lived at 209 West George Street, Glasgow.

He died in Glasgow on 16 May 1874.

In his will, he bequeathed a library of 12,000 books and 130 incunabula to the University of Glasgow and the Anderson College, Glasgow, the latter part being reunited with the main collection in 1936. The terms of the will allowed sale of books to maintain or rebind the remainder and sale of duplicates. Some 1800 duplicates were sold to Glasgow Corporation, helping to build the foundation of the Mitchell Library.

== Family ==
Euing's cousins included James Smith of Jordanhill and William Smith of Carbeth Guthrie.

== The Euing Collection ==
The Euing Collection contains examples of rare books, first editions and manuscripts including:

- Imitatio Christi by Thomas a Kempis (1420)
- Don Quixote by Miguel de Cervantes (1605)
- First Folio of William Shakespeare's works (1623)
- Anatomy of Melancholy by Robert Burton (1621)
- Paradise Lost by John Milton (1667)
- Paradise Regained by John Milton (1671)
- The Pilgrim's Progress by John Bunyan (1678)
- Musick's Monument by Thomas Mace (1676)
- An Essay Concerning Human Understanding by John Locke (1689)
- Gulliver's Travels by Jonathan Swift (1729)
- Over 500 black-letter ballads
- 2500 volumes of early music manuscripts
- Over 300 medieval and early Bibles
