= Doolittle Report, 1954 =

- Created: September 30, 1954
- Location: Washington, D.C., United States
- Commissioned by: Dwight D. Eisenhower (President of the United States)
- Author: Lieutenant General James H. Doolittle
- Subject: Personnel, security, and efficacy of the Central Intelligence Agency's Directorate of Plans
- Purpose: Comprehensive evaluation of U.S. covert operations during the Cold War

The Report on the Covert Activities of the Central Intelligence Agency (The Doolittle Report) is a 69-page formerly classified comprehensive study on the personnel, security, adequacy, and efficacy of the Central Intelligence Agency written by Lieutenant General James H. Doolittle. United States President Dwight Eisenhower requested the report in July 1954 at the height of the Cold War and following coups in Iran and Guatemala. The report compares with other contemporary Cold War documents such as George Kennan's "X" article in Foreign Affairs, which recommended a policy of "containment" rather than direct confrontation with the Soviet Union, and NSC 68, the secret policy document produced in 1950, which recommended a similarly restrained policy of “gradual coercion.” Doolittle wrote with an abandon-all-principles approach that conveyed the national fear that the United States faced the prospect of annihilation at the hands of the Soviet Union: “It is now clear that we are facing an implacable enemy whose avowed objective is world domination by whatever means and at whatever cost,” Doolittle wrote. “There are no rules in such a game… If the United States is to survive, long standing concepts of ‘fair play’ must be reconsidered.” Doolittle’s forceful policy and language reflected the fear that motivated American citizens and policymakers in the wake of Soviet Communism.

== Context ==
At the time the report was commissioned the role of the CIA, formed in 1947, was still not clear. President Harry S. Truman viewed the CIA as an intelligence gathering organization that should have limited power and that should not be used to overthrow foreign governments. President Eisenhower’s global security strategy relied on nuclear deterrence and the overthrow of foreign governments by covert means with the goal of saving the lives of soldiers and maintaining international stability by supporting governments favorable to the US. He had seen the power of intelligence in his role as Supreme Commander of the Allied Forces in Europe. Code breaking and other covert projects had been crucial to the Allied war effort.

It is hard to overstate the fear of the spread of communism that was present in the early Cold War period. The Czechoslovak "constitutional coup" of 1948 sparked fears that any communist presence in government or civic society posed an imminent threat. In Czechoslovakia, the communist party had not been able to secure many government positions, but leveraged a position inside the cabinet to stage a legal coup and install a communist regime. The Berlin Blockade of 1948-1949 reinforced the Soviet threat as both a credible and imminent threat unlike any the United States had faced before. Mao Zedong took control of China in 1949. An armistice was agreed to in the Korean War in 1953, which heightened fears that America was willing to compromise with communists. In August 1953, the Soviet Union exploded a hydrogen bomb. These events severely jolted American confidence and led Eisenhower to commission a report on how the CIA should respond.

Doolittle was a heroic figure as a result of the air raid he led on the Japanese home islands after the attack on Pearl Harbor. He was awarded a Medal of Honor for his service. After the war, Doolittle returned to civilian life. He served as Vice President of Shell Oil, and worked with a variety of government commissions. Doolittle’s honorable service record and wide range of experience beyond simple operations were notable factors that led Dwight Eisenhower to entrust him with the report.

Eisenhower often brought in outsiders to assess government projects and agencies. One similar case was the Committee on International Information Activities. This group, known as the Jackson Committee for its chairman William Harding Jackson, an attorney and investment banker, recommended a stronger commitment to propaganda and psychological warfare. Similarly, the Gaither Report, produced by a committee led by Horace Rowan Gaither, urged stronger civil defense in preparation for a possible nuclear attack.

Eisenhower sought an outside opinion on the CIA for various reasons. In 1954, several US Senators were rallying to create a committee that would oversee the CIA and keep Congress informed about the CIA’s projects. If any reforms to the CIA were necessary, however, Eisenhower wanted to execute them in secret. Further, he was waiting for the results of an “overall appraisal” of US intelligence as part of the Second Hoover Commission’s study of the executive branch from his close friend General Mark Clark. Then, in May 1954, Eisenhower received a letter from longtime CIA operative Jim Kellis that complained about the supposed incompetency of the CIA and the many faults of its Director of Central Intelligence, Allen Dulles. Although Eisenhower and Dulles shared many views on security, Eisenhower wanted an independent review. In July 1954 he commissioned Doolittle to write a report assessing the CIA.

== Summary ==
The Doolittle Report advocated policies not usually associated with democratic countries. The tense security fears of the Cold War were reflected on a domestic level, exemplified by McCarthyism. Americans were seized by a fear of communism. Doolittle echoed this sentiment in his report: “We must develop effective espionage and counterespionage services and must learn to subvert, sabotage and destroy our enemies by more clever, more sophisticated and more effective methods than those used against us. It may become necessary that the American people be acquainted with, understand and support this fundamentally repugnant philosophy.” This mindset is present throughout Doolittle’s general observations about the CIA’s role and its impact on American society. He also produced specific recommendations for changes in the CIA.

=== Personnel ===
The Doolittle Report stated that the most important element of covert operations was personnel. It argued that the CIA should dismiss operatives and analysts who were not highly competent. Doolittle argued that “there is no place in the C.I.A. for mediocrity.” In order to raise standards in the agency the report suggested that recruiting be improved. Doolittle also urged intensified training of those already in the agency, and policies to assure that personnel would only be assigned to duties and locations for which they were highly qualified. His report recommended a smaller but more effective workforce and urged that the CIA director should be “above political considerations”.

=== Security ===
Doolittle found security lapses in the CIA and asserted that there was nothing more important than the continued “recognition at all levels throughout the Agency of the importance of security in all its aspects.” Although impressed by the system of security clearances for CIA personnel, he thought it should be extended to short-term personnel and field agents who were not regular CIA staff. Doolittle also insisted that polygraph examinations should be more widely used as an “aid to investigation and interrogation as long as the present high standards govern [its] use.”

Doolittle repeatedly criticized the security procedures involving overseas agents. He was highly skeptical of agents who received special clearances or were reassigned in the field. “We cannot emphasize too strongly the importance of the continuation and intensification of CIA’s counter-intelligence efforts to prevent, or detect and eliminate penetrations of CIA,” he says. To counteract this possibility, Doolittle recommended intensified counterespionage activities to uncover attempts at infiltration.

Doolittle focused on “security consciousness” as a solution for the CIA’s internal security deficiencies. He recommended the implementation of “security awareness” programs for personnel and the adoption of an “inflexible attitude” toward security breaches. In regards to information security, he believed that the CIA’s classified data were too accessible. Further, he recommended that field agents be briefed on the level of cover that they had during missions.

=== Coordination ===
The Doolittle Report found that cooperation and communication between the CIA and armed services was inadequate and needed to be improved. It recommended closer ties between the CIA, the military, and other agencies, with a particular focus on finding and exploiting Soviet defectors. One of its recommendations was the “establishment of definite world-wide objectives for the future, and formulation of a comprehensive long-range plan for their achievement.”

=== Organization ===
The Doolittle Report recommended reorganization of the CIA and streamlining of its covert arm, the Deputy Directorate for plans. It also called for centralized facilities to be provided for the CIA, which in 1954 comprised 43 buildings in and around Washington D.C. Both facilities and practices should be designed to maximize security.

=== Cost ===
Doolittle found that the CIA budget was adequate and that its budgetary procedures were satisfactory. Expensive political, psychological, and paramilitary CIA projects were subject to review by a Project Review Committee, although foreign intelligence projects were not reviewed. Nonetheless, he recommended that a comptroller record and control expenditures more tightly.

== Conclusion ==
After sending his Report on the Covert Activities of the Central Intelligence Agency to President Eisenhower, Doolittle came to the White House to meet the President on October 19, 1954. At this meeting, he warned Eisenhower about what he considered Allen Dulles’ emotional attachment to his job and the dangers of his intimate relationship with his brother, Secretary of State John Foster Dulles. He asserted that the combination of the brothers could be potentially problematic as they might attempt to implement ideas and policies without consulting proper administration officials. Further, Doolittle used the meeting to re-criticize the CIA’s personnel. He said the CIA had “ballooned into a vast and sprawling organization manned by a large number of people, some of whom were of doubtful confidence.” After the meeting, Eisenhower sent a letter to Allen Dulles urging that he implement Doolittle’s recommendations. “I consider these [covert] operations as essential to our national security in these days when International Communism is aggressively pressing its world-wide subversion programme,” he wrote.

Dulles agreed to reshape the CIA in accordance with the report’s recommendations, but did not do so. He did not carry out many of the recommendations of the Doolittle Report but rather ignored it and did not even show it to his senior aides.

After former CIA director Walter Bedell Smith left the US government in October 1954, there was no one left to exert control over Allen Dulles except Eisenhower. Eisenhower subsequently created the “Special Group,” which was charged with reviewing, but not approving, CIA covert actions. Dulles, however, felt he was the only one in the position to judge the work of his agency, and did not make any significant changes as a result of the report.

Despite Dulles’ resistance to the Doolittle Report, he did follow its recommendations for improvements in intelligence technology. One result was the 1954 Berlin Tunnel project, which was designed to dig underground passageways to tap into Soviet telecommunications lines. The project ran for a year and the CIA considered it to be a tremendous success. Later, however, it became clear that the Soviets had discovered the project early on and possibly fed the CIA deceptive information. At the end of 1954, in another reaction to the Doolittle Report’s recommendation of intensified technological forms of intelligence, Eisenhower gave Dulles permission to build the U-2 spy plane to photograph the Soviet Union. This produced a grave crisis in 1960, when one of the planes was shot down and its pilot captured by the Soviets.
