= Andrew Young (British politician) =

Andrew Young, JP (1858–17 February 1943) was a British teacher and magistrate who served as MP for Glasgow Partick from 1923 to 1924.

== Biography ==
In December 1881, he took up a teaching position at Edinburgh's North Canongate School, situated in the Canongate slum district. From 1895, Young served as the school's headmaster, a position he held for 27 years in till the year 1922. In 1944, following his death, he left £100 in a charitable trust which is annually distributed to schools.

Young was considered active in the Edinburgh Labour movement, and stood as a Socialist MP for the Glasgow Partick constituency in the 1923 general election. He lost the seat in the general election held the next year. Moreover, he served on the Town Council of Edinburgh in 1926 on various committees dealing with issues such as housing and public health. Young was additionally elected a Bailie, and, after serving a term, retired in 1933.

In 1923, he was elected Chair of the Edinburgh Association of the Educational Institute of Scotland.

Young was also known to be a Curator of Patronage of the University of Edinburgh.

Young also served as Governor of the Heriot Trust, as a member of the Edinburgh Educational Endowments Trust, of the Scottish Central Aftercare Council, and of the Earl Haig Unity Relief Fund.

Parliament of the United Kingdom
| Preceded by John Collie | Member of Parliament for Glasgow Partick; 1923–1924 | Succeeded by George Broun-Lindsay |
