= Archibald Smith =

Scottish barrister and amateur mathematician

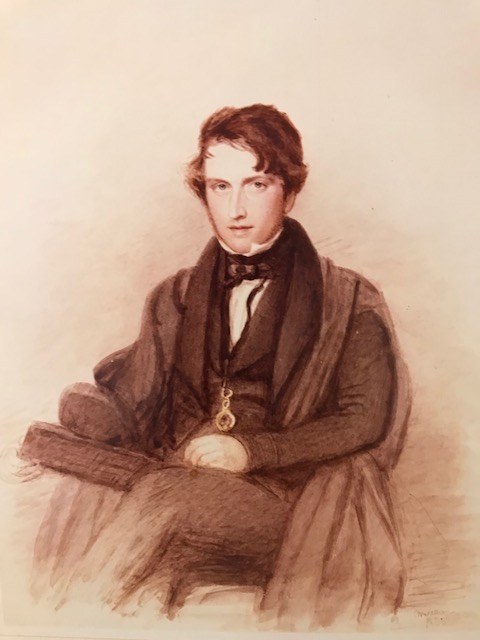
Archibald Smith of Jordanhill, upon graduation at Trinity College, Cambridge (Senior Wrangler)

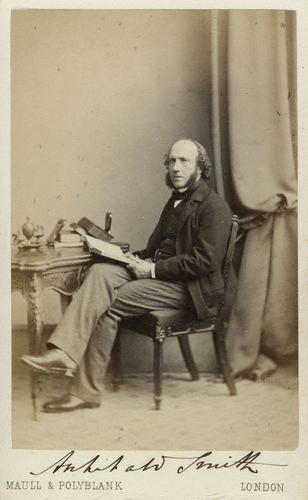
Carte de visite depicting Archibald Smith, 1860s.

Archibald Smith of Jordanhill FRS FRSE (10 August 1813, in Greenhead, North Lanarkshire – 26 December 1872, in London) was a Scottish barrister and amateur mathematician.

== Early life and education ==
He was the only son of James Smith FRSE (1782-1867), a wealthy merchant and antiquary and owner of the Jordanhill estate in Glasgow, and his wife Mary Wilson, granddaughter of Alexander Wilson, professor of astronomy in Glasgow University (and brother of Patrick Wilson). He was educated at the Redland School near Bristol from 1826 to 1828.

Archibald studied law at Glasgow University from 1828, and then at Trinity College, Cambridge, where he was Senior Wrangler, said to be the first Scot to achieve this position, and first Smith's prizeman in 1836, elected a fellow of Trinity College. He was one of the founders of the Cambridge Mathematical Journal. He graduated BA in 1836 and MA in 1839.

== Career as lawyer ==
He entered Lincoln's Inn, and was called to the bar as a barrister in 1841. He then practised as an equity draughtsman and property lawyer in London.

== Career as scientist ==
His scientific work was mainly in the field of applications of magnetism and the Earth's magnetic field. He obtained practical formulae for the correction of magnetic compass observations made on board ship, which General Sir Edward Sabine published in the Transactions of the Royal Society: Smith later made convenient tables. In 1859 he edited William Scoresby's Journal of a Voyage to Australia for Magnetical Research and gave an exact formula for the effect of the iron of a ship on the compass. In 1862, in conjunction with the hydrographer Sir Frederick John Owen Evans FRS (1815-1885), then superintendent of the compass department of the navy, he published an Admiralty Manual for ascertaining and applying the Deviations of the Compass caused by the Iron in a Ship.

He was elected a Fellow of the Royal Society of Edinburgh in 1837 his proposer being James David Forbes. Elected a Fellow of the Royal Society in June 1856, he was awarded its Royal Medal in 1865 "for his papers in the Philosophical Transactions and elsewhere, on the magnetism of ships". In 1866 Emperor Alexander II of Russia presented him with a gold compass, set in diamonds, and emblazoned with the Imperial Arms.

He died in London on 26 December 1872.

== Personal life ==
In 1853, Smith married Susan Emma Parker, daughter of Sir James Parker of Rothley Temple, Leicestershire, and Mary Babington. They had six sons and two daughters:

- James Parker Smith FRSE (1854–1929) M.P. for Partick, Lanarkshire
- Rev. Walter Edward Smith (1855–1940), vicar at Andover
- Lt. Com. Charles Stewart Smith (1859–1934), Royal Navy officer, British diplomat
- Arthur Hamilton Smith (1860–1941), museum curator and archaeologist
- Sir Henry Babington Smith (1863–1923), prominent civil servant and banker
- Mary Susan Smith (1865–1915)
- Margaret Smith (1867–1904)
- Brig. Gen. George Edward Smith (1868–1944)
