= John Collie (doctor) =

Scottish medical doctor and public servant

Sir John Collie

Sir Robert John Collie CMG DL JP (15 August 1860 –4 April 1935) was a Scottish medical doctor and public servant who also served as National Liberal Party MP for Glasgow Partick from 1922 to 1923.

== Background ==
He was the fourth son of James Collie, of Pitfodels, Aberdeenshire. He was educated at Aberdeen University. He married, in 1886 Jessie Edgar of Locharwoods, Dumfriesshire. They had one son. He was knighted in 1912. He was made a Companion of the Order of St Michael and St George in 1918. He was appointed a Deputy Lieutenant. He was a Justice of the peace in the County of London. His wife Jessie died in 1928.

== Professional career ==
He was Chief Medical Officer Metropolitan Water Board; Consulting Medical Officer to the Ministry of Pensions; Hon. Member Massachusetts Society of Physicians; Medical Examiner to the London County Council; Vice-President Medico-Legal Society; Member Royal Commission on Venereal Diseases, 1913–15; Temporary and Honorary Colonel Auxiliary Medical Services (despatches); Director of Medical Services, Ministry of Pensions; President Special Medical Board for Neurasthenia; Home Office Medical Referee Workmen's Compensation Act.

== Political career ==
He was a Lloyd George supporting National Liberal candidate for the Partick Division of Glasgow at the 1922 General Election. In 1918 Partick had been won by a Lloyd George supporting Liberal, who had decided to retire. Collie was adopted by Partick Liberal Association in April 1922. Collie's only opponent was also a Liberal, who was supported by the Liberals led by H. H. Asquith. Collie had the approval of the Partick Unionist Association. He comfortably won the seat;

General election 1922: Glasgow Partick Electorate
Party	Candidate	Votes	%	±%
National Liberal	Sir Robert John Collie	11,754		
Liberal	Sir Daniel Macaulay Stevenson	6,282		
National Liberal hold		Swing		

In parliament he voted against a Unionist government amendment to the Safeguarding of Industries Act 1921 in which he joined with other Liberals in support of Free trade. In 1923 he introduced a Merchant Shipping Acts Amendment Bill, however before the bill had the chance to be passed, the Unionist Prime Minister Stanley Baldwin dissolved parliament to have an election on his policies of introducing trade tariffs. The two wings of the Liberal party united in support of free trade and Collie gave them his full support. However, he decided not to defend his seat and retired from parliament.

== Publications ==
- Fraud and its Detection in Accident Insurance Claims, 1912
- Malingering, 1913
- The Psychology of the Fraudulent Mind, 1913
- The Business Side of Medical Practice
- Fraud in Medico-legal practice, 1932
- Workman's Compensation in its Medical Aspect, 1933
- Edited Recent Advances in Medicine and Surgery, 1933

Parliament of the United Kingdom
Preceded by Sir Robert Balfour, Bt	Member of Parliament for Glasgow Partick; 1922–1923	Succeeded by Andrew Young
