= Sir Robert Balfour, 1st Baronet =

British politician

Robert Balfour MP, circa 1900

Sir Robert Balfour, 1st Baronet (6 March 1844 – 4 November 1929) was a Scottish Liberal Party politician who sat in the House of Commons of the United Kingdom from 1906 to 1922. He was the member of parliament for Partick from 1906 to 1918, and for Glasgow Partick from 1918 to 1922.

== Background ==
He was born in Pilmuir, Largo, Fife in 1844, a son of James Balfour. He was educated at Madras College in St Andrews. He married Josephine Maria Beazley of Liverpool. They had two sons.

== Business career ==
In 1863 he joined the merchant firm Balfour, Williamson & Co. From 1869 to 1893, he was stationed in San Francisco. From 1893 to 1899 he was based in Liverpool and then in London from 1899.

== Political career ==
In 1906, Balfour was elected as a Member of Parliament in Glasgow. At the following general election in 1918, he supported the Coalition government of Lloyd George, and was awarded the 'coupon'; He retired from Parliament just before the 1922 UK general election.

He was created a Baronet on 3 February 1911. The baronetcy became extinct upon his death in 1929.

== Electoral history ==
General election 1906: Partick
| Party | Candidate | Votes | % | ±% |
|---|---|---|---|---|
| Liberal | Robert Balfour | 9,477 | 54.3 | +14.3 |
| Conservative | Rt Hon. James Parker Smith | 7,960 | 45.7 | −14.3 |
| Liberal gain from Liberal Unionist | | Swing | 14.3 | |

General election Jan 1910: Partick
| Party | Candidate | Votes | % | ±% |
|---|---|---|---|---|
| Liberal | Robert Balfour | 10,093 | 51.5 | −2.8 |
| Liberal Unionist | Archibald White Maconochie | 9,522 | 48.5 | +2.8 |
| Liberal hold | | Swing | -2.8 | |

General election Dec 1910: Partick
| Party | Candidate | Votes | % | ±% |
|---|---|---|---|---|
| Liberal | Robert Balfour | 10,535 | 50.8 | −0.7 |
| Liberal Unionist | Archibald White Maconochie | 10,190 | 49.2 | +0.7 |
| Liberal hold | | Swing | -0.7 | |

General election 1918: Partick
| Party | Candidate | Votes | % | ±% |
|---|---|---|---|---|
| Liberal | Sir Robert Balfour | 12,156 | 70.1 | +19.2 |
| Labour | William Mackie | 5,173 | 29.9 | +29.9 |
| Liberal hold | | Swing | -5.4 | |

== Notes ==
Parliament of the United Kingdom
| Preceded by James Parker Smith | Member of Parliament for Partick; 1906–1918 | Constituency abolished |
| New constituency | Member of Parliament for Glasgow Partick; 1918–1922 | Succeeded by John Collie |
Baronetage of the United Kingdom
| New creation | Baronet (of Albury Lodge); 1911–1929 | Extinct |
| Preceded by Jameson baronets | Balfour baronets of Albury Lodge; 3 February 1911 | Succeeded by Baring baronets |
