= Committee on Industry and Trade =

The Committee on Industry and Trade, also known as the Balfour Report because it was chaired by the industrialist Arthur Balfour, was a committee set up to discover the reasons for the United Kingdom's economic decline since the Great War. It sat from 1924 to 1928.

The Committee's Final Report appeared in 1929 and concluded that what was needed was the rationalisation of Britain's staple industries. The losses to employers due to rationalisation would be remedied by the development of newer industries. Also, the Report found that the market had failed to bring about rationalisation due to the rigidities in Britain's economic system. The Report appeared "in six volumes, contained a searching examination of the country's industrial competitiveness and made recommendations concerning the UK's future ability to compete in overseas markets".
