= Baron Riverdale =

Barony in the Peerage of the United Kingdom

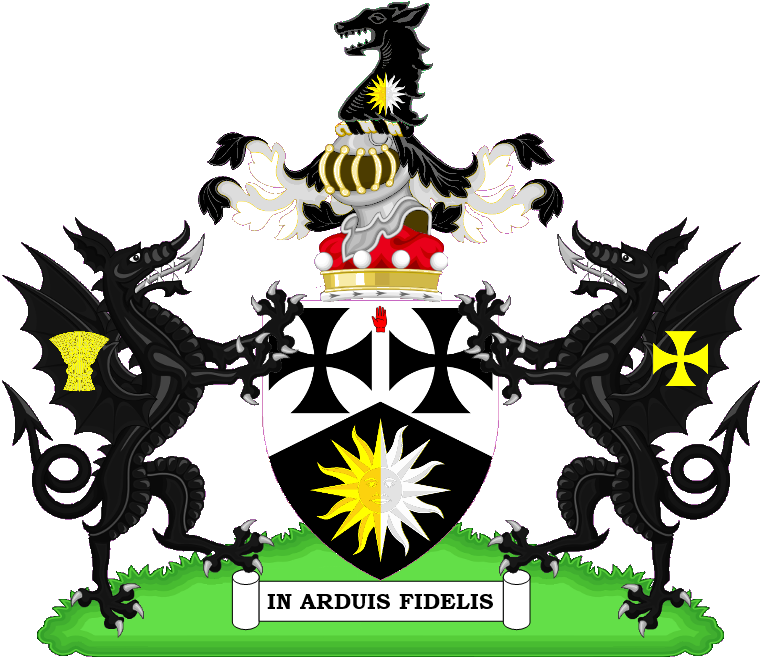
- Per chevron argent and sable, in chief two crosses pattée of the second, and in base a sun in splendour per pale or and of the first.
- Creation date: 27 June 1935
- Created by: King George V
- Peerage: Peerage of the United Kingdom
- First holder: Sir Arthur Balfour, 1st Baronet
- Present holder: Anthony Balfour, 3rd Baron Riverdale
- Heir presumptive: Hon. David Rowland Balfour
- Remainder to: 1st Baron's heirs male of the body lawfully begotten
- Motto: In arduis fidelis ("Faithful in difficulties")

Baron Riverdale, of Sheffield in the County of York, is a title in the Peerage of the United Kingdom. It was created on 27 June 1935 for the Sheffield steel manufacturer Sir Arthur Balfour, 1st Baronet, Chairman of Arthur Balfour & Co Ltd.

Balfour had already been created a baronet, of Sheffield in the County of York, in the Baronetage of the United Kingdom, on 26 June 1929. He was succeeded by his eldest son, the second Baron. He was chairman and president of Balfour & Darwins Ltd (formerly Arthur Balfour & Co Ltd) as well as president of the Association of British Chambers of Commerce. He was a lieutenant commander in the Royal Navy in the Second World War.

Since 1998, the titles have been held by his grandson, the third Baron, who succeeded in 1998. He is the only son of the Hon. Mark Robin Balfour, eldest son of the second Baron.

== Barons Riverdale (1935) ==
- Arthur Balfour, 1st Baron Riverdale (1873–1957)
- Robert Arthur Balfour, 2nd Baron Riverdale (1901–1998)
  - Hon. Mark Robin Balfour (1927–1995)
- Anthony Robert Balfour, 3rd Baron Riverdale (born 1960)

The heir presumptive is the present holder's uncle the Hon. David Rowland Balfour (born 1938).

== Line of succession ==
- Arthur Balfour, 1st Baron Riverdale (1873–1957)
  - Robert Arthur Balfour, 2nd Baron Riverdale (1901–1998)
    - Hon. Mark Robin Balfour (1927–1995)
      - Anthony Robert Balfour, 3rd Baron Riverdale (born 1960)
    - (1) Hon. David Rowland Balfour (b. 1938)
  - Hon. Francis Henry Balfour (1905–1994)
    - (2) Arthur Michael Balfour (b. 1938)
      - (3) Edward Francis Balfour (b. 1965)
      - (4) James Henry Balfour (b. 1966)
    - (5) Jeremy Ralph Balfour (b. 1948)
      - (6) Robert Henry Balfour (b. 1980)
      - (7) Andrew James Balfour (b. 1991)
      - (8) Daniel Mark Balfour (b. 1991)
        - (9) William Henry Balfour (b. 2023)
