= Gaither Report =

1957 US report planning for a nuclear attack

Deterrence & Survival in the Nuclear Age, commonly referred to as the Gaither report, is a US government report concerning strategy to prepare against the perceived threat of a nuclear attack from the Soviet Union. It was submitted to the United States National Security Council and the president in November 1957.

It was prepared by a panel constituted as part of the Science Advisory Committee, at that time part of the Office of Defense Mobilization. The report's common name stems from the panel's first chairman H. Rowan Gaither.

== Preparation ==
It was prepared by a panel constituted as part of the Science Advisory Committee, at that time part of the Office of Defense Mobilization. The report's common name stems from the panel's first chairman H. Rowan Gaither. He and the group were tasked by President Dwight D. Eisenhower with creating a strategy that would strengthen the US military defensive systems, and better prepare the US for a nuclear attack. The report was largely written by panel members Paul Nitze and George Lincoln.

== Content ==
The report called for an urgent strengthening of US missile technology, along with offensive and defensive military capabilities. It also called for a fifty percent increase in US military spending and a redesign of the US Defense Department. The committee presented the Gaither Report to President Eisenhower on November 7, 1957. The report suggested that Eisenhower's military policy--reliance on cheap nuclear weapons instead of expensive Army divisions--was inadequate. He kept the document secret and generally ignored it, but its conclusions were leaked to the press.

While the president had asked for an evaluation of fallout and blast shelters, the opening page of the report stated that their purpose was to "form a broadbrush opinion of the relative value of various active and passive measures to protect the civilian populations in case of nuclear attack and its aftermath." This look at active protective measures relegated shelters to a secondary position in a report now concentrated on nuclear deterrence. The rationale for this can be found in their belief that the Soviet Union, with its expedient development of military technology, had already exceeded the technical achievements made by the U.S. in intercontinental ballistic missile (ICBM) research. The authors relied upon grossly inaccurate Air Force intelligence that estimated the number of Soviet ICBMs to be in the hundreds or as many as a thousand. In reality this was an enormous overestimate by some orders of magnitude. Newly-developed satellite photography would make this even clearer four years later. Even by 1961, the number of operational Soviet ICBMs was around four.

Unlike its predecessor, the Killian Report, the Gaither Report advocated the continuation of attempts to reach the agreement with Soviets "on the limitation of armaments".
