= Alexander Craig Sellar =

Scottish lawyer and politician

Alexander Craig Sellar (17 October 1835 – 16 January 1890) was a Scottish lawyer and Liberal Party (later Liberal Unionist) politician.

Sellar was the son of Patrick Sellar of Westfield, Morayshire, a lawyer, factor and sheep farmer, and his wife Ann (née Craig). He was educated at Rugby School, and at Balliol College, Oxford where he was a favoured student of Benjamin Jowett. He became a Scottish Advocate in 1862 and was legal secretary to the Lord Advocate for Scotland from 1870 to 1874. In 1873 he published Manual of the Education Act for Scotland. He was a justice of the peace and deputy lieutenant for Argyllshire.

In 1870 he married Gertrude Smith, daughter of Octavius Henry Smith.

In 1880 he stoody unsuccessfully for Parliament at Plymouth Devonport. In 1882 he was elected member of parliament for Haddington Burghs until the constituency was merged in the Redistribution of Seats Act 1885. In 1885 he was elected MP for Partick which he held until his death at the age of 54 in 1890. When the Liberal split in 1886 over Irish Home Rule, Sellar joined the breakaway Liberal Unionist Party.

Sellar is commemorated with his scholar brother William Young Sellar on the south wall of Balliol College Chapel.

Parliament of the United Kingdom
Preceded by Sir David Wedderburn	Member of Parliament for Haddington Burghs; 1882 – 1885	Succeeded by See; Haddingtonshire constituency
Preceded by See; North Lanarkshire constituency	Member of Parliament for Partick; 1885 – 1890	Succeeded by James Parker Smith
