= Arthur Balfour, 1st Baron Riverdale =

British steel manufacturer (1873–1957)

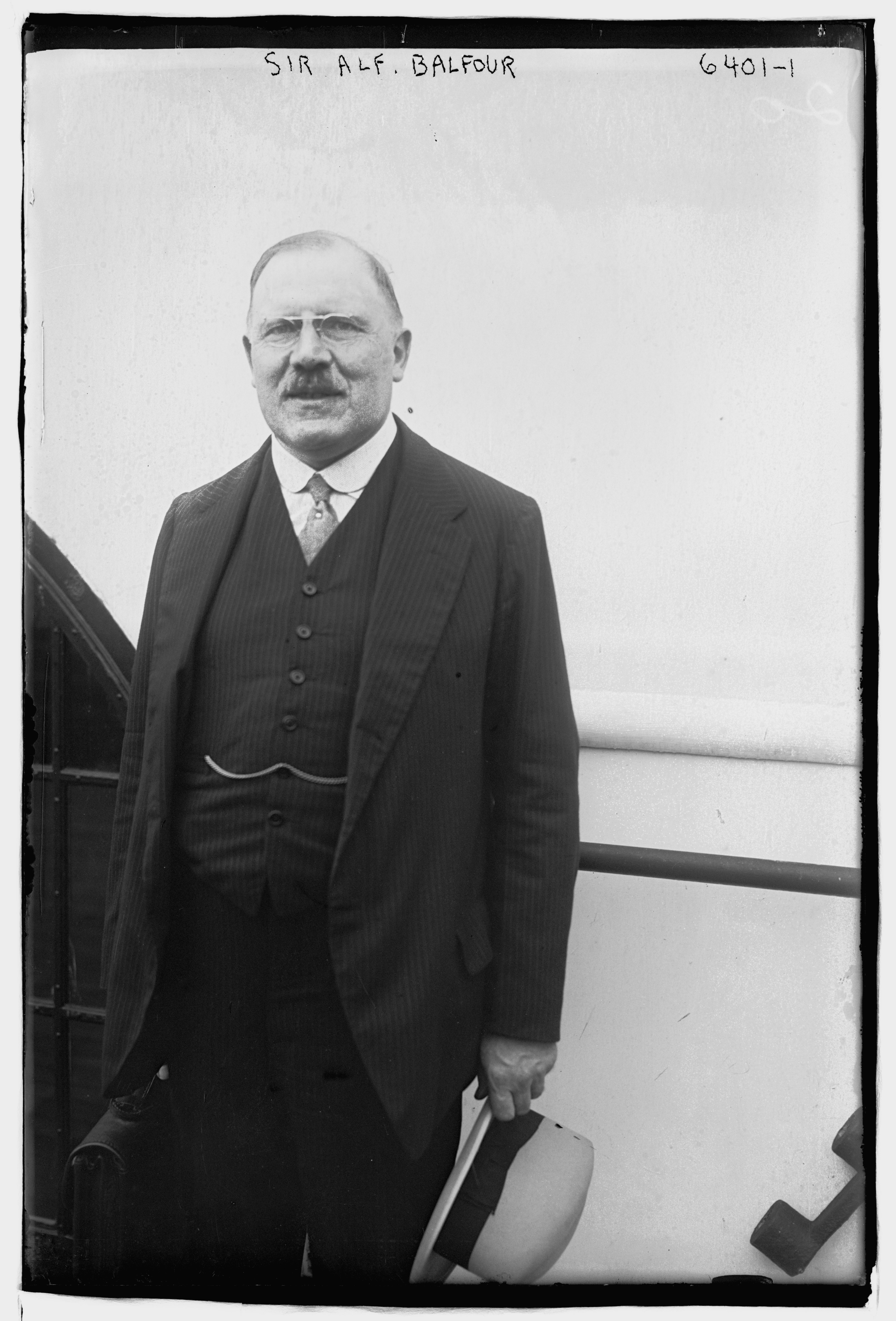
Sir Arthur A. Balfour, 1925

Arthur Balfour, 1st Baron Riverdale, (9 January 1873 – 7 July 1957), known as Sir Arthur Balfour (1923 -1929) and Sir Arthur Balfour, 1st Baronet (1929 - 1935), was a British steel manufacturer.

Balfour was the son of Herbert Balfour. Educated at Aysgarth School and Oundle School, he was Chairman of Arthur Balfour & Co Ltd and of C Meadows & Co Ltd, both of Sheffield, Yorkshire. He also served as President of the Association of British Chambers of Commerce from 1923 to 1924 and of the British Council from 1947 to 1950 and as Chairman of the Advisory Council for Scientific and Industrial Research from 1937 to 1957. He chaired the Committee on Industry and Trade from 1924 to 1928.

In 1935 he was appointed as the chairman of the Departmental Committee on Fire Brigade Services, which became known as the Riverdale Committee. The committee's report resulted in the Fire Brigades Act 1938 (1 & 2 Geo. 6. c. 72).

Balfour married Frances Josephine Bingham, daughter of Charles Henry Bingham, in 1899. He died in July 1957, aged 84, and was succeeded in his titles by his eldest son Robert. Lady Riverdale died in 1960. He was a freemason and founding member of University Lodge Sheffield 3911.

== Honours and styles ==
He was appointed a Knight Commander of the Order of the British Empire (KBE) in the 1923 Birthday Honours, created a Baronet of Sheffield in the County of York in 1929, and raised to the peerage as Baron Riverdale, of Sheffield in the County of York, on 27 June 1935. On 11 June 1942 he was even further honoured when he was appointed a Knight Grand Cross of the Order of the British Empire for services to the Empire Air Training Scheme.

On 2 March 1943, he was made an honorary air commodore of the Auxiliary Air Force, serving in the No. 601 Squadron RAF.

Coat of arms of Arthur Balfour, 1st Baron Riverdale
Crest In front of a dragon’s head Sable a sun as in the arms. Escutcheon Per chevron Argent and Sable in chief two crosses pattée of the second and in base a sun in splendour per pale Or and of the first. Supporters Two dragons Sable each charged on the wing the dexter with a garb and the sinister with a cross pattée Or. Motto In Arduis Fidelis

Peerage of the United Kingdom
New creation	Baron Riverdale; 1935–1957	Succeeded by Robert Arthur Balfour
Baronetage of the United Kingdom
New creation	Baronet (of Sheffield); 1929–1957	Succeeded by Robert Arthur Balfour
