= Glasgow Partick =

Parliamentary constituency in the United Kingdom, 1885–1950

- Former burgh constituency for the House of Commons
- Subdivisions of Scotland: County of city of Glasgow

1918–1950
- Seats: One
- Created from: Partick
- Replaced by: Glasgow Hillhead and Glasgow Scotstoun

Glasgow Partick was a burgh constituency represented in the House of Commons of the Parliament of the United Kingdom from 1918 until 1950.

== Boundaries ==
The previous 1885–1918 county constituency consisted of "So much of the Parish of Govan as lies north of the Clyde and beyond the present boundary of the municipal burgh of Glasgow, and so much of the parish of Barony as lies to the west of the present main line of railway between Glasgow and Edinburgh of the North British Railway Company (being the old Edinburgh and Glasgow Railway) and beyond the present boundary of the municipal burgh of Glasgow."

In 1918 the constituency consisted of "That portion of the city which is bounded by a line commencing at a point on the municipal boundary at the centre line of the North British Railway (Stobcross Branch), thence south-eastward along the centre line of the said North British Railway to the centre line of the River Kelvin, thence south-westward along the centre line of the River Kelvin to the centre line of the River Clyde, thence westward along the centre line of the River Clyde, to the municipal boundary, thence northward and north-eastward along the municipal boundary to the point of commencement."

== Members of Parliament ==
Election	Member	Party
1918	Sir Robert Balfour	Coalition Liberal
1922	Sir John Collie	National Liberal
1923	Andrew Young	Labour Co-operative
1924	George Broun-Lindsay	Unionist
1929	Adam McKinlay	Labour
1931	Charles MacAndrew, later Baron MacAndrew	Unionist
1935	Sir Arthur Young	Unionist

== Elections ==
=== Elections in the 1910s ===
General election 1918: Glasgow Partick
Party		Candidate	Votes	%	±%
C	Liberal	Robert Balfour	12,156	70.15	
	Labour	William Mackie	5,173	29.85	
Majority			6,983	40.30	
Turnout			17,329	61.07	
Registered electors			28,376		
	Liberal win (new seat)				
C indicates candidate endorsed by the coalition government.

=== Elections in the 1920s ===
Collie

General election 1922: Glasgow Partick
Party	Candidate	Votes	%	±%
National Liberal	John Collie	11,754	65.17	−4.98
Liberal	Daniel Macaulay Stevenson	6,282	34.83	N/A
Majority		5,472	30.34	−9.96
Turnout		18,036	66.68	+5.61
Registered electors		27,048		
National Liberal hold		Swing	−4.98	

General election 1923: Glasgow Partick
Party	Candidate	Votes	%	±%
Labour Co-op	Andrew Young	8,397	44.03	New
Unionist	Allan Smith	6,315	33.11	New
Liberal	MacCallum Scott	4,358	22.85	−11.98
Majority		2,082	10.92	N/A
Turnout		19,070	71.14	+4.46
Registered electors		26,806		
Labour Co-op gain from Liberal		Swing		

General election 1924: Glasgow Partick
Party	Candidate	Votes	%	±%
Unionist	George Broun-Lindsay	13,167	57.80	+24.59
Labour Co-op	Andrew Young	9,612	42.20	−1.83
Majority		3,555	15.60	N/A
Turnout		22,779	82.35	+11.21
Registered electors		27,660		
Unionist gain from Labour Co-op		Swing	+13.21	

General election 1929: Glasgow Partick
Party	Candidate	Votes	%	±%
Labour	Adam McKinlay	13,110	45.54	+3.34
Unionist	George Broun-Lindsay	12,701	44.12	−13.68
Liberal	John Taylor	2,975	10.33	New
Majority		409	1.42	N/A
Turnout		28,786	78.83	−3.52
Registered electors		36,517		
Labour gain from Unionist		Swing	+8.51	

=== Elections in the 1930s ===
General election 1931: Glasgow Partick
Party	Candidate	Votes	%	±%
Unionist	Charles MacAndrew	18,904	62.68	+18.56
Labour	Adam McKinlay	11,252	37.31	−8.23
Majority		7,652	25.37	N/A
Turnout		30,156	83.46	+4.63
Registered electors		36,134		
Unionist gain from Labour		Swing	+13.40	

General election 1935: Glasgow Partick
Party	Candidate	Votes	%	±%
Unionist	Arthur Young	15,616	53.97	−8.71
Labour	Adam McKinlay	13,316	46.03	+8.72
Majority		2,300	7.94	−17.43
Turnout		28,932	78.20	−5.26
Registered electors		36,999		
Unionist hold		Swing	−8.72	

General Election 1939–40

Another General Election was required to take place before the end of 1940. The political parties had been making preparations for an election to take place and by the Autumn of 1939, the following candidates had been selected;

- Unionist: Arthur Young
- Labour: Adam McKinlay

=== Elections in the 1940s ===
General election 1945: Glasgow Partick
Party	Candidate	Votes	%	±%
Unionist	Arthur Young	13,851	51.59	−2.38
Labour Co-op	George Alexander Younger	12,998	48.41	+2.38
Majority		853	3.18	−4.77
Turnout		26,849	69.02	−9.18
Registered electors		38,899		
Unionist hold		Swing	−2.38	
