= Arthur Smith (curator) =

British archaeologist and curator (1860–1941)

Arthur Hamilton Smith, FBA (1860–1941) was a British Museum curator and archaeologist.

His brothers were civil servant Henry Babington Smith and MP James Parker Smith. All three attended Trinity College, Cambridge and were members of the Cambridge Apostles.

He attended the Second International Congress of Archaeologists held in Cairo on 7-14 April 1909. He conveyed the greetings of the world's universities to the Congress. Alongside Louis Duchesne he presided over Section IV: Religious Archaeology

Smith was Keeper of Greek and Roman Antiquities at the British Museum from 1909 to 1925. In addition, he served as president of the Society for the Promotion of Hellenic Studies from 1924 to 1929 and director of the British School at Rome from 1928 to 1930 and in 1932.
