= James Parker (judge) =

British barrister

Sir James Parker (28 March 1803 – 1852) was a British barrister who became Vice Chancellor of the High Court.

Parker was born in Glasgow, the son of Charles Stuart Parker and his wife Mary Rainey. He was educated at Glasgow Grammar School and Trinity College, Cambridge, where he stood seventh wrangler in the Tripos in 1825. He contributed Arithmetic and Algebra in fours parts (1827–1830) to the Library of Useful Knowledge (authorship by a Mr. Parker, AM, is identified in an edition in 1847, and clinched, for example, in advertisements on 16 January and 17 July 1860 in Publishers' Circular and Bookseller's' Record). In 1829, he was called to the bar at Lincoln's Inn and was an equity draftsman and conveyancer. He practiced on the Northern circuit and became Queen's Counsel in 1844. Parker purchased the estate of Rothley Temple from his father-in-law Thomas Babington in 1845.

Parker became a Vice-Chancellor in 1851 and received a knighthood. However he died the following year at the age of 49 from angina pectoris and was buried in the chapel at Rothley.

Parker married Mary Babington, third daughter of Thomas Babington in 1829. Their daughter Susan Emma Parker married Archibald Smith and their son James Parker was a successful rower. Parker was the uncle of Charles Stuart Parker MP.

An obituary notice appeared in the issue of Gentleman's Magazine for October, 1852.

== Arms ==
Coat of arms of James Parker
Crest A dexter arm couped at the shoulder embowed Proper holding a spear Or the head Proper. Escutcheon Or three escutcheons Sable each charged with a pheon Argent. Motto Caveo (I Am Watching Out)

Legal offices
Preceded by Richard Torin Kindersley	Vice-Chancellor; 1851–1852	Succeeded by Sir John Stuart
