= Frederick L. Anderson =

American pilot and banker

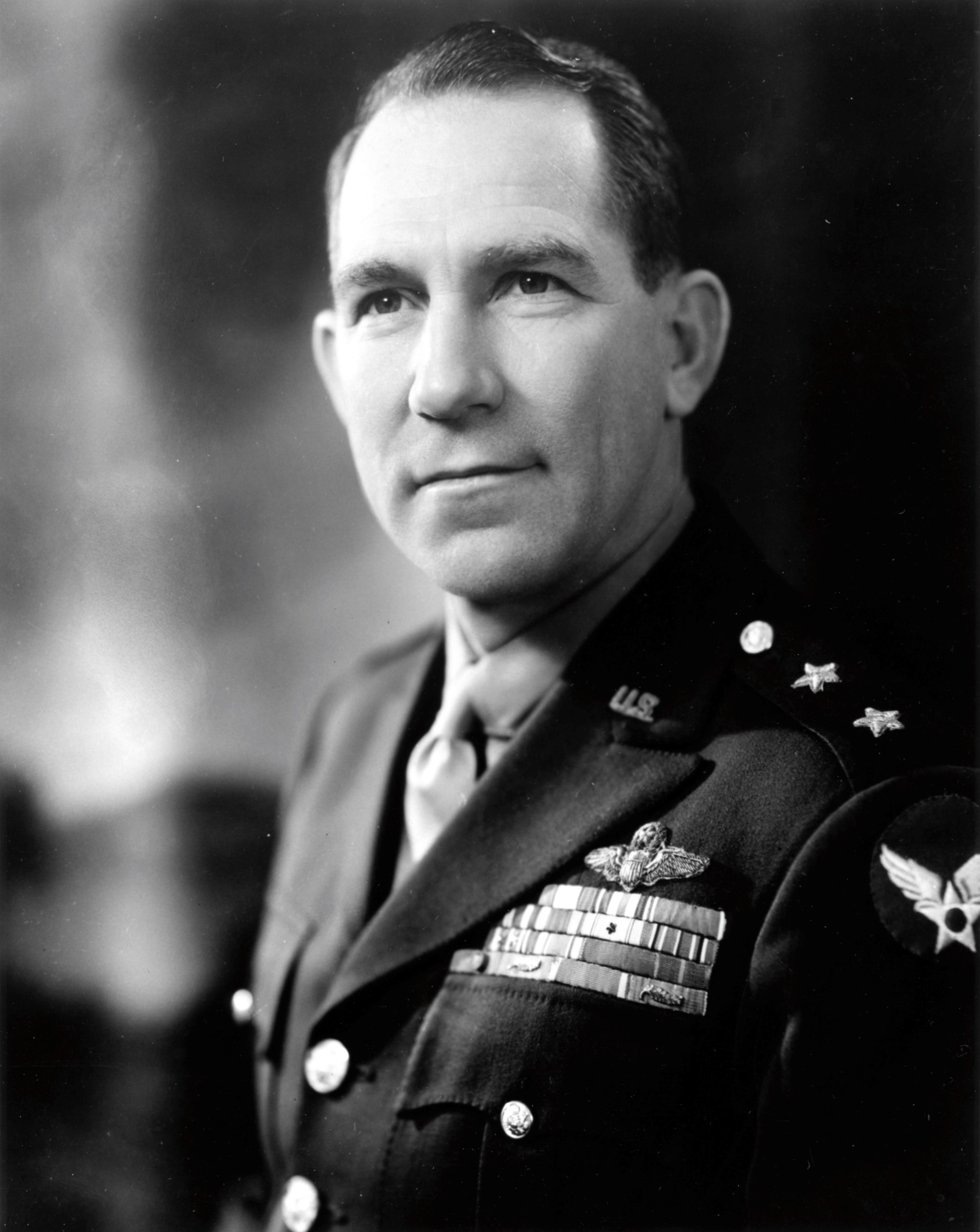

Special Representative in Europe for the Mutual Security Program
- In office 1952–1953

Assistant Chief, Air Staff for Personnel
- In office ?–1947

Deputy Commander of Operation Headquarters, United States Strategic Air Forces in Europe
- In office 1944–1945

Personal details
- Born: April 4, 1905 Kingston, New York
- Died: March 3, 1969 (aged 63) Houston, Texas
- Resting place: Arlington National Cemetery
- Spouse: Elizabeth Travis
- Education: United States Military Academy
- Awards: Pacific Flying Cross; Distinguished Service Medal (x3); Air Medal; Legion of Merit; Distinguished Flying Cross; Silver Star; Commander of the Order of the Bath; Order of Suvorov (3rd Degree); Legion of Honour; Croix de Guerre (with palm)

Military service
- Branch/service: United States Army; United States Army Air Corps; United States Army Air Forces; United States Air Force
- Rank: Major General
- Battles/wars: World War II; European Theatre

Frederick Lewis Anderson, Jr. was an American military officer most notable as a pioneer of strategic air methods, tactics, techniques, and strategies that became foundational for modern Geospatial intelligence and air command. He was the first instructor of Bombardment for the United States. During World War II, he served as the commander of the Eighth Bomber Command. After the war, in banking circles and Silicon Valley, he is most known as a co-founder of Draper, Gaither & Anderson, alongside William Henry Draper III and Rowan Gaither, which was the first-ever venture capital firm on the West Coast of the United States.
