= James Smith of Jordanhill =

Scottish merchant, antiquarian, architect, geologist, biblical critic and man of letters

James Smith of Jordanhill

James Smith of Jordanhill FRSE FRS MWS (1782–1867) was a Scottish merchant, antiquarian, architect, geologist, biblical critic and man of letters. An authority on ancient shipbuilding and navigation, his works included "Newer Pliocene" (1862) and "Voyage and Shipwreck of St Paul" (1848).

He is remembered as a competent yachtsman. His most notable yacht was named Wave.

== Life ==
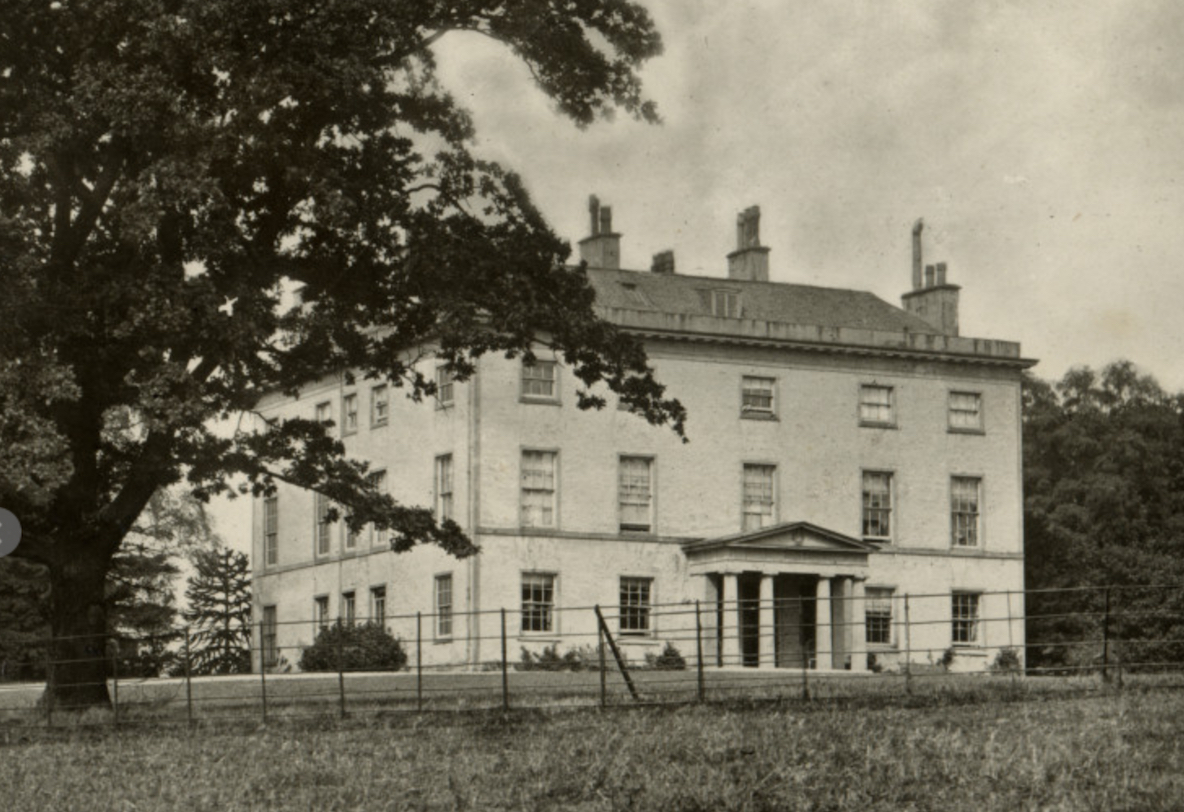
Jordanhill House

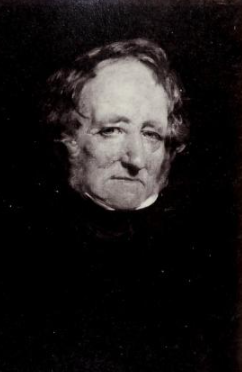
Smith in old age

James Smith was born on 15 August 1782 at Jordanhill House near Glasgow, the son of a West Indies merchant Archibald Smith of Jordanhill (1749–1821) and his wife, Isobel Ewing (1755–1855). In 1800 he was a captain in the Renfrewshire militia.

Smith was educated at Glasgow Grammar School and then studied Sciences at Glasgow University, specialising in Geology. He became a sleeping partner in his father's firm, Leitch & Smith, in 1809 and later served as president of the Andersonian University, Glasgow.

He was elected a Fellow of the Royal Society of Edinburgh in 1822, upon the proposal of Lord John Campbell, and served as a Councillor of the Society from 1836 to 1839. He served as president of the Geological Society of Glasgow (1864–1867) and was also President of the Archaeological Society of Glasgow. He was a Member of the Wernerian Society, a member of the Highland Society (1823), and a founder of the Glasgow Yacht Club.

In 1822 he was elected a Fellow of the Royal Society of Edinburgh, his proposer being Lord John Campbell. In 1830 he was also elected a Fellow of the Royal Society of London. He was also a Fellow of the Geological Society of London.

He died on 17 January 1867 at Jordanhill House.

== Family ==
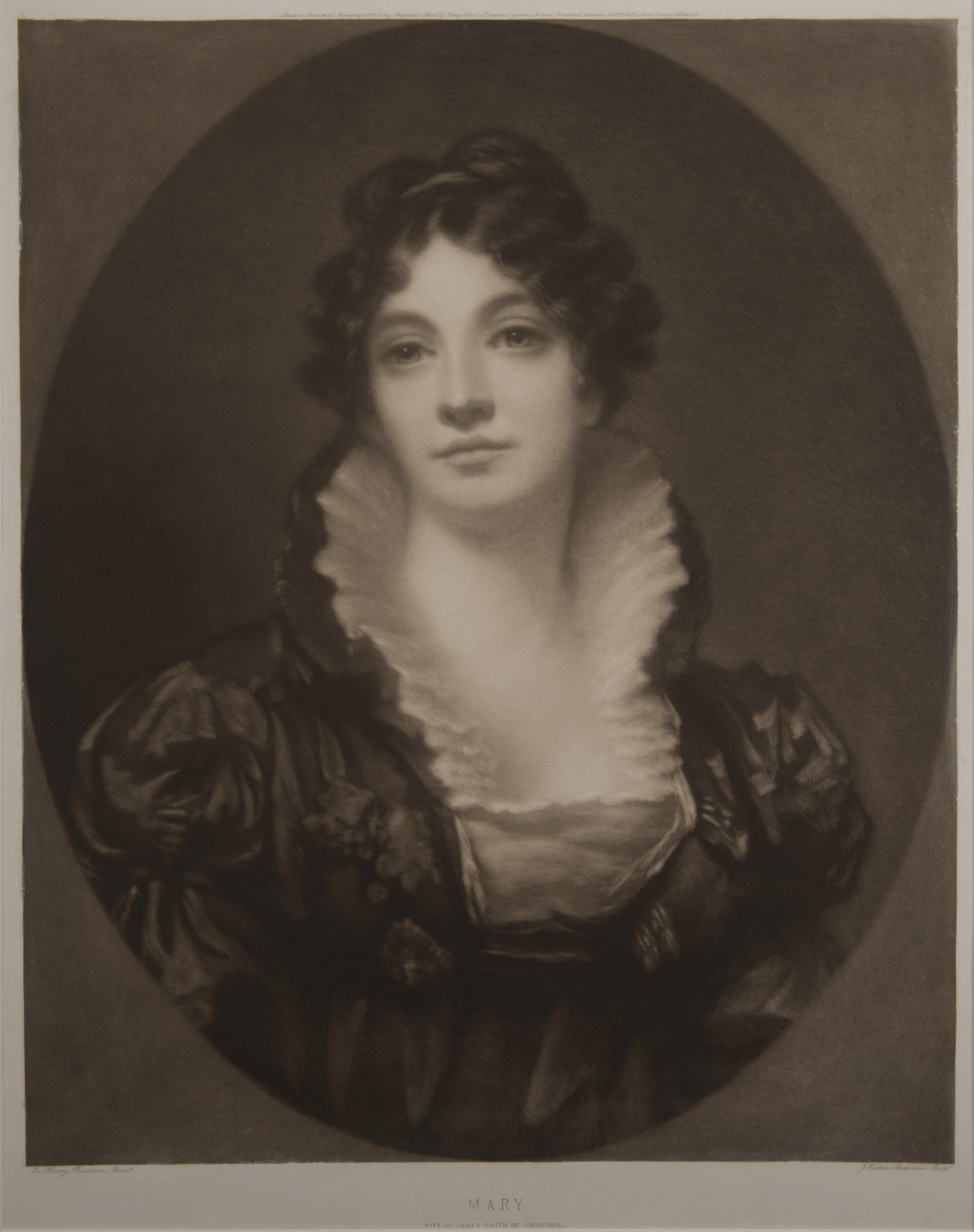
Mary Smith (née Wilson) of Jordanhill, Mezzotint based on a portrait by Sir Henry Raeburn

On 25 August 1809 Smith married Mary Wilson (granddaughter of Alexander Wilson and niece of Patrick Wilson) in 1809. Their children were:

- Archibald Smith of Jordanhill (1813–1872)
- Christina Laura Smith, married to Walter Buchanan of Shandon, M.P.
- Isabella Smith (1806–1897), married to Henry Gore-Booth
- Mary Joanna Guthrie Smith (-1840)
- Louisa Smith (-1863), married to William Hamilton of Minard Castle
- Sabina Douglas Clavering Smith, married to Rev. Robert Paisley, DD. of St. Nininans, co Stirling

His cousin was the insurance broker and philanthropist William Euing FRSE (1788–1874). His younger brother was William Smith of Carbeth Guthrie was Lord Provost of Glasgow from 1822 to 1824.

== Publications ==
- The Voyage and Shipwreck of St Paul, with Dissertations on the Sources of the Writings of St. Luke, and the Ships and Navigation of the Antients (4 Editions, 1848–1880)
- Researches in New Pliocene and Post-Tertiary Geology (1862)
- Dissertations on the Life and Writings of St Luke
- The Ships and Navigation of the Ancients

== Trivia ==
Smiths Court on Brunswick Street in Glasgow was named after the family.

Jordanhill House was acquired by Glasgow Corporation in 1911 for use a training college and demolished in 1961.

== Artistic recognition ==
His portrait by Sir John Watson Gordon is held by the Trades House Museum in Glasgow.
