= Partick (UK Parliament constituency) =

UK Parliament constituency (1885–1918)

- Former county constituency for the House of Commons
- Subdivisions of Scotland: Lanarkshire

1885–1918
- Seats: One
- Created from: North Lanarkshire
- Replaced by: Glasgow Partick

Partick was a county constituency represented in the House of Commons of the Parliament of the United Kingdom from 1885 until 1918.

A division of the county of Lanarkshire, its territory was incorporated into the city of Glasgow in the 1890s. For the 1918 general election, it was largely replaced by the new Glasgow Partick constituency, a division of the city of Glasgow.

== Boundaries ==
From 1885 the constituency consisted of "So much of the Parish of Govan as lies north of the Clyde and beyond the present boundary of the municipal burgh of Glasgow, and so much of the parish of Barony as lies to the west of the present main line of railway between Glasgow and Edinburgh of the North British Railway Company (being the old Edinburgh and Glasgow Railway) and beyond the present boundary of the municipal burgh of Glasgow."

== Members of Parliament ==
Election	Member	Party
1885	Alexander Craig Sellar	Liberal
1886	Alexander Craig Sellar	Liberal Unionist
1890	James Parker Smith	Liberal Unionist
1906	Sir Robert Balfour	Liberal
1906	Constituency abolished. See Glasgow Partick	

== Elections ==
Decades:	1880s; 1890s; 1900s; 1910s

=== Elections in the 1880s ===
General election 1885: Partick
Party	Candidate	Votes	%	±%
Liberal	Alexander Craig Sellar	3,726	51.9	
Conservative	Henry Lennox	3,385	47.1	
Scottish Land Restoration	John Murdoch	74	1.0	
Majority		341	4.8	
Turnout		7,185	80.3	
Registered electors		8,945		
Liberal win (new seat)				

General election 1886: Partick
Party	Candidate	Votes	%	±%
Liberal Unionist	Alexander Craig Sellar	3,745	56.0	+8.9
Liberal	Robert Allan McLean	2,944	44.0	−7.9
Majority		801	12.0	N/A
Turnout		6,689	74.8	−5.5
Registered electors		8,945		
Liberal Unionist gain from Liberal		Swing	+8.4	

=== Elections in the 1890s ===
1890 Partick by-election
Party	Candidate	Votes	%	±%
Liberal Unionist	James Parker Smith	4,148	51.4	−4.6
Liberal	Charles Tennant	3,929	48.6	+4.6
Majority		219	2.8	−9.2
Turnout		8,077	85.7	+10.9
Registered electors		9,429		
Liberal Unionist hold		Swing	−4.6	

Tennant

General election 1892: Partick
Party	Candidate	Votes	%	±%
Liberal Unionist	James Parker Smith	5,005	53.9	−2.1
Liberal	Edward Tennant	4,278	46.1	+2.1
Majority		727	7.8	−4.2
Turnout		9,283	81.1	+6.3
Registered electors		11,453		
Liberal Unionist hold		Swing	−2.1	

General election 1895: Partick
Party	Candidate	Votes	%	±%
Liberal Unionist	James Parker Smith	5,551	56.1	+2.2
Liberal	William Lyon Mackenzie (Scottish advocate)	4,344	43.9	−2.2
Majority		1,207	12.2	+4.4
Turnout		9,895	75.2	−5.9
Registered electors		13,152		
Liberal Unionist hold		Swing	+2.2	

=== Elections in the 1900s ===
General election 1900: Partick
Party	Candidate	Votes	%	±%
Liberal Unionist	James Parker Smith	6,950	59.6	+3.5
Liberal	Robert Lambie	4,717	40.4	−3.5
Majority		2,233	19.2	+7.0
Turnout		11,657	73.3	−1.9
Registered electors		15,921		
Liberal Unionist hold		Swing	+3.5	

Balfour

General election 1906: Partick
Party	Candidate	Votes	%	±%
Liberal	Robert Balfour	9,477	54.3	+13.9
Liberal Unionist	James Parker Smith	7,960	45.7	−13.9
Majority		1,517	8.6	N/A
Turnout		17,437	81.4	+8.1
Registered electors		21,411		
Liberal gain from Liberal Unionist		Swing	+13.9	

=== Elections in the 1910s ===
General election January 1910: Partick
Party	Candidate	Votes	%	±%
Liberal	Robert Balfour	10,093	51.5	−2.8
Liberal Unionist	Archibald White Maconochie	9,522	48.5	+2.8
Majority		571	3.0	−5.6
Turnout		19,615	84.2	+2.8
Liberal hold		Swing	-2.8	

General election December 1910: Partick
Party	Candidate	Votes	%	±%
Liberal	Robert Balfour	10,535	50.8	−0.7
Liberal Unionist	Archibald White Maconochie	10,190	49.2	+0.7
Majority		345	1.6	−1.4
Turnout		20,715	84.2	0.0
Liberal hold		Swing	-0.7	

General Election 1914–15:

Another General Election was required to take place before the end of 1915. The political parties had been making preparations for an election to take place and by July 1914, the following candidates had been selected;

- Liberal: Robert Balfour
- Unionist: Robert Horne
