= Thomas Babington =

British politician (1758–1837)

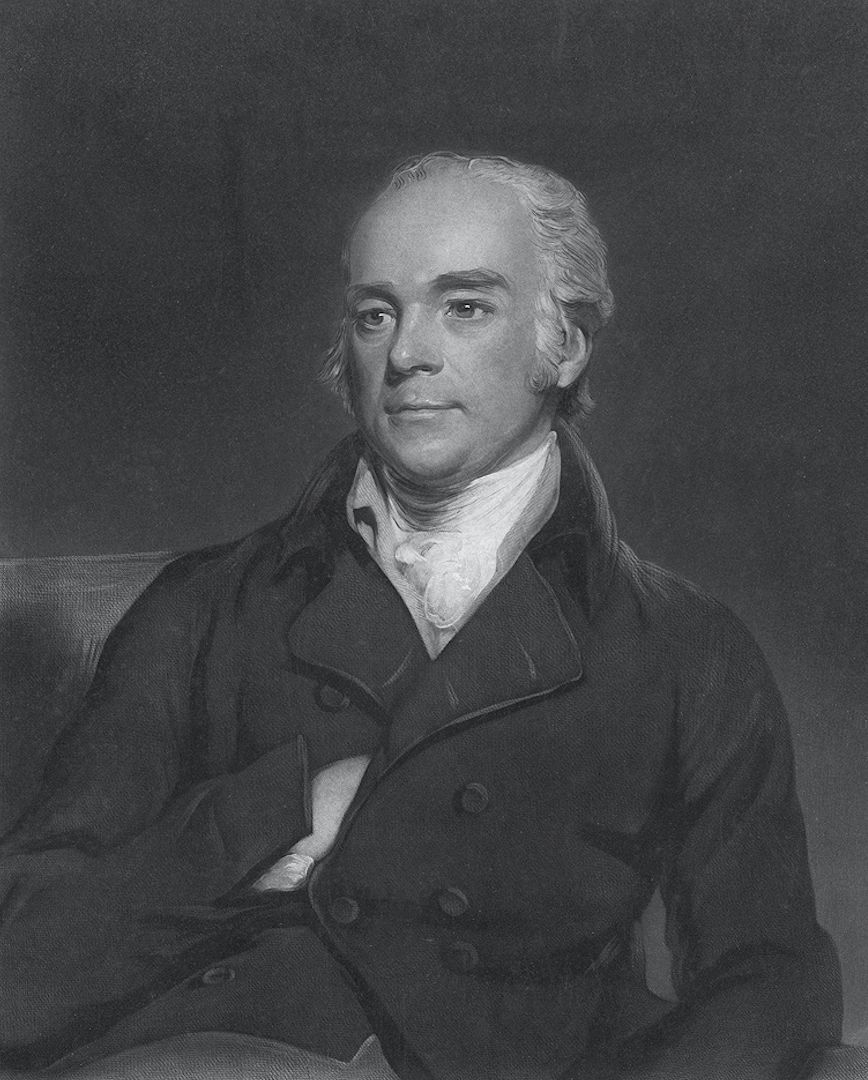
Thomas Babington of Rothley Temple (1758–1837), by Sir Thomas Lawrence

Thomas Babington of Rothley Temple (/ˈbæbɪŋtən/; 18 December 1758 – 21 November 1837) was an English philanthropist and politician. He was a member of the Clapham Sect, alongside more famous abolitionists such as William Wilberforce and Hannah More. An active anti-slavery campaigner, he had reservations about the participation of women associations in the movement.

== Early life and education ==
He was the eldest son of Thomas Babington of Rothley Temple, Leicestershire, from whom he inherited Rothley and other land in Leicestershire in 1776. A member of the Babington family, he was educated at Rugby School and St John's College, Cambridge where he met William Wilberforce and other prominent anti-slavery agitators.

== Anti-slavery and philanthropy ==
Babington was an evangelical Christian of independent means who devoted himself to a number of good causes. His home at Rothley Temple was regularly used by Wilberforce and associates for abolitionist meetings, and it was where the bill to abolish slavery was drafted. There is a stone memorial to commemorate to this on the front lawn of Rothley which still stands today.

Babington's base in London was 17 Downing Street. He shared use of this residence with his brother-in-law, General Colin Macaulay who was similarly active in the abolitionist cause.

In addition to his anti-slavery work, he also offered to pay half the cost of smallpox inoculation for people in Rothley in 1784–5. He set up a local Friendly Society to purchase corn for sale to the poor at a lower price to improve the lives and diet of his estate workers. Trusts he set up to provide housing in local villages still exist today.

Babington was active politically, and supported moves to extend voting rights to more people. He was High Sheriff of Leicestershire in 1780 and MP for Leicester from 1800 to 1818.

== Family ==
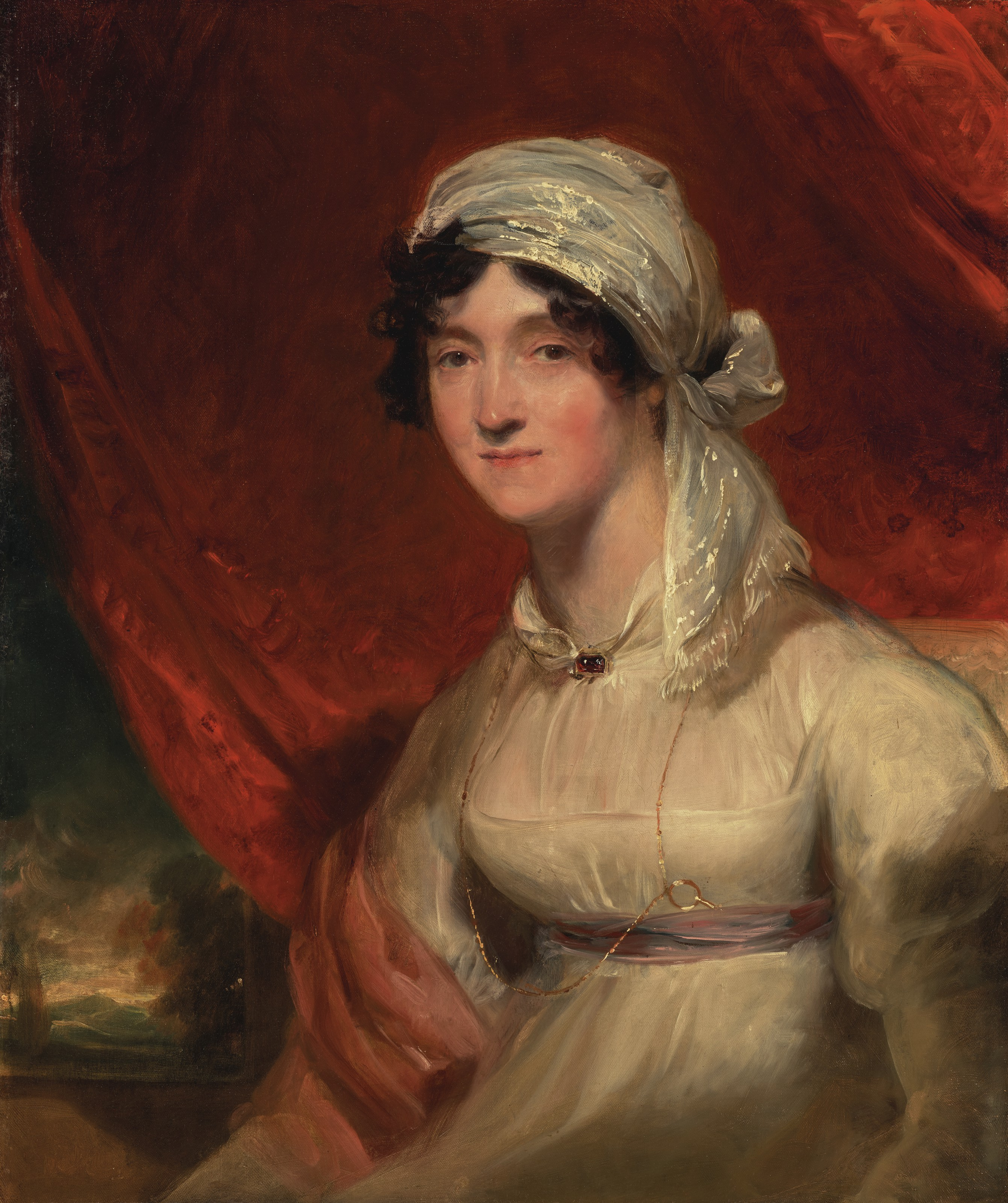
Jean Babington (Macaulay), by Sir Thomas Lawrence

On 8 October 1787 Babington married Jean Macaulay, daughter of the Rev. John Macaulay (1720–1789) of Cardross, Dumbartonshire. Jean came from a family who like Babington, were prominently involved in the anti-slavery movement. This included two brothers Zachary Macaulay, and General Colin Macaulay: Thomas Babington Macaulay was Jean's nephew. Thomas and Jean had six sons and four daughters:

- Thomas Gisborne Babington (1788–1871)
- Lydia Rose Babington (1789–1880)
- Rev. John Babington (1791–1885)
- Matthew Babington, JP (1792–1836)
- George Gisborne Babington, FRCS (1794–1856)
- Jean Babington (1798–1839)
- Mary Babington (1799–1858), wife of Sir James Parker, Vice-Chancellor
- William Henry Babington, E.I.C.C.S (1803–1867)
- Margaret Anne Babington (1804–1819)
- Lieutenant Charles Roos Babington (1806–1826)

Babington died at Rothley Temple in 1837 at the age of 78, and is buried in the chapel there. His wife Jean died on 21 September 1845.

A memoir of Thomas Babington, his family and grandchildren, was written by his granddaughter, Eliza Conybeare in 1874.

Parliament of Great Britain
Preceded by Thomas Parkyns and Samuel Smith	Member of Parliament for Leicester; 1800–1801; With: Samuel Smith	Succeeded by Parliament of the United Kingdom
Parliament of the United Kingdom
Preceded by Parliament of Great Britain	Member of Parliament for Leicester; 1801–1818; With: Samuel Smith	Succeeded by John Mansfield and Thomas Pares
