= Balfour (surname) =

Balfour is a Scottish surname born by members of the Clan Balfour.

Balfour commonly refers to Arthur Balfour (1848–1930), Prime Minister of the United Kingdom from 1902 to 1905, 1st Earl of Balfour and later Foreign Secretary.

Balfour may also refer to:

== Barons Kinross ==
- John Balfour, 1st Baron Kinross (1837–1905), British politician
- Patrick Balfour, 3rd Baron Kinross (1904–1976), British historian

== Balfours of Balbirnie ==
- Robert Balfour, 4th of Balbirnie (1698–1767)
- Robert Balfour, 6th of Balbirnie (1762–1837), cavalry officer

== Balfours of Whittingehame ==
- James Balfour (died 1845) (c 1775–1845), Scottish nabob, landowner and Tory politician
- James Maitland Balfour (1820–1856), Scottish politician
- Eustace Balfour (1854–1911), Scottish architect and aide-de-camp to King Edward VII
- Lady Frances Balfour (1858–1931), British aristocrat, author, and suffragist
- Francis Maitland Balfour (1851–1882), British biologist
- Elizabeth Balfour, Countess of Balfour (1867–1942), British suffragette and politician
- Lady Eve Balfour (1899–1990), English pioneer of organic farming

== Other titles ==
- Earl of Balfour
- Balfour baronets
- Lord Balfour of Burleigh
- Baron Balfour of Glenawley
- Baron Kinross
- William Balfour Baikie

== Others ==
- Alexander Balfour (disambiguation)
- Andrew Balfour (1873–1931), Scottish medical officer, author and international rugby player
- Andrew Balfour of Montquhanie (died 1615), Scottish landowner
- Constance Balfour (1880–1965), American singer
- David Balfour (disambiguation)
  - David A. Balfour (1889–1956), Canadian politician
  - David Paton Balfour (1841–1894), New Zealand sheepfarmer, station manager, roading supervisor and diarist
- Donald Balfour (1882–1963), Canadian surgeon
- Dontae Balfour (born 2002), American football player
- Edward Balfour (1808–1884), Scottish surgeon and orientalist in India
- Eric Balfour (born 1977), American actor
- Evan Balfour (born 1965), Scottish footballer
- Fiona Balfour (born 1958), Australian business executive in the field of information technology
- Francis Balfour (disambiguation)
- Frederic H. Balfour (fl. 1871–1908), British essayist and translator
- George William Balfour (1823–1903), Scottish physician
- Sir Graham Balfour (1858–1929), Victorian statistician and member of Florence Nightingale's inner circle
- Grant Balfour (born 1977), baseball player
- H. Balfour Gardiner (1877–1950), British composer
- Harriët Balfour (1818–1858), Surinamese freed slave
- Harold Balfour, 1st Baron Balfour of Inchrye (1897–1988), British World War I fighter ace and Conservative politician
- Henry Balfour (1863–1939), archaeologist
- Honor Balfour (1912–2001), British politician and journalist
- Sir Isaac Bayley Balfour (1853–1922), Scottish botanist and son of John Hutton Balfour
- James Balfour (architect) (1854–1917), Canadian architect from Hamilton, Ontario
- James Balfour (Canadian politician) (1928–1999)
- James Balfour (clergyman) (1731–1809), Newfoundland Church of England clergyman
- James Balfour (engineer) (1831–1869), New Zealand marine engineer
- James Balfour (philosopher) (1705–1795), Scottish advocate and philosopher
- James Balfour (planter) (1777–1841), Scottish-born Surinamese planter
- James Balfour, Lord Pittendreich (1583–1584), Scottish judge and politician
- Sir James Balfour of Denmilne and Kinnaird, 1st Baronet (1600–1658), Scottish annalist and antiquary, Lord Lyon King of Arms from 1650 to 1654
- Sir James Balfour Paul (1846–1931), Scottish heraldist, Lord Lyon King of Arms from 1890 to 1926
- John Hutton Balfour (1808–1884), Scottish botanist and father of Sir Isaac Bayley Balfour
- Lawrie Balfour, American philosopher
- Mabel Balfour, South African trade unionist and anti-apartheid activist
- Nancy Balfour (1911–1997), English arts administrator and journalist
- Ronald Egerton Balfour (1896–1941), British illustrator
- Sebastian Balfour (born 1941), English historian
- William Balfour (died 1660), English Civil War general
