= James Balfour =

James Balfour may refer to:

== Politics ==
- James Balfour, Lord Pittendreich (1525–1583), Scottish judge and politician
- James Balfour (died 1845) (c. 1775–1845), member of parliament for Anstruther Burghs 1826–31 and Haddingtonshire 1831–35
- James Maitland Balfour (1820–1856), Scottish politician, member of parliament for Haddington Burghs 1841–47
- James Balfour (Australian politician) (1830–1913), Scottish-born Australian merchant and politician
- James Balfour (mayor) (1867–1947), educator, lawyer and political figure in Saskatchewan, Canada
- James Miller Balfour (1874–1943), Australian politician
- James Balfour (Canadian politician) (1928–1999), Saskatchewan
- Jim Balfour (1914–1990), Australian politician

== Other ==
- James Balfour, 1st Baron Balfour of Glenawley or Clonawley (died 1634), Scottish nobleman and courtier
- Sir James Balfour, 1st Baronet of Denmilne and Kinnaird (c. 1600–c. 1658), Scottish annalist and antiquary
- James Balfour (philosopher) (1705–1795), Scottish philosopher
- James Balfour (priest) (1731–1809), Newfoundland Church of England clergyman
- James Balfour (British Army officer) (1743–1823), commander-in-chief of Bombay, 1794; colonel of the 83rd Regiment
- James Balfour (planter) (1777–1841), Scottish-born Surinamese planter
- James Balfour (engineer) (1831–1869), Scottish-born New Zealand marine engineer
- James Balfour (architect) (1854–1917), Canadian architect from Hamilton, Ontario, Canada

== See also ==
- Sir James Balfour Paul (1846–1931), Scottish herald, Lord Lyon King of Arms 1890–1926
