= Robert Balfour =

Robert Balfour may refer to:

- Robert Balfour (philosopher) (c. 1553–1621), Scottish philosopher
- Robert Balfour, 2nd Lord Balfour of Burleigh (died 1663), Scottish military commander
- Robert Balfour, 5th Lord Balfour of Burleigh (died 1757), Scottish Jacobite
- Robert Balfour, 4th of Balbirnie (1698–1766), Scottish Member of Parliament
- Robert Balfour, 6th of Balbirnie (1772–1837), British Army general
- Sir Robert Balfour, 1st Baronet (1844–1929), British politician, MP for Glasgow Partick
- Robert Balfour, 3rd Earl of Balfour (1902–1968), Scottish peer
- Robert Drummond Balfour (1844–1915), English cricketer
