= Michael Balfour =

Michael Balfour may refer to:

- Michael Balfour (historian) (1908–1995), English historian and civil servant
- Michael Balfour, 1st Lord Balfour of Burleigh (died 1619), Scottish peer
- Sir Michael Balfour, 4th Baronet (1634–1698) of the Balfour baronets
- Sir Michael Balfour, 5th Baronet (1676–1709) of the Balfour baronets
- Sir Michael Balfour, 6th Baronet (died 1750) of the Balfour baronets
- Michael Balfour (actor) (1918–1997), English actor in The Krays film

== See also ==
- Balfour (surname)
