= General Balfour =

General Balfour may refer to:

- James Balfour (British Army officer) (1743–1823), British Army general
- Nisbet Balfour (1743—1823), British Army major general
- Philip Balfour (1898–1977), British Army lieutenant general
- Robert Balfour, 6th of Balbirnie (1772–1837), British Army lieutenant general
- Thomas Graham Balfour (1813–1891), British Army surgeon general
- William Balfour (general) (c. 1578–1660), Scottish-born English Civil War general
