= Kappler =

Kappler or Käppler is a surname. Notable people with the surname include:

- August Kappler (1815–1887), German researcher, naturalist and explorer from Mannheim
- Bianca Kappler (born 1977), German long jumper
- Chris Kappler (born 1967), American equestrian, showjumper and Olympic gold and silver medalist
- Darren Kappler (born 1965), former professional Australian rules footballer
- Emanuel Selway "Jack" Kappler (1892–1969), former Australian rules footballer
- Herbert Kappler (1907–1978), head of German police and security forces in Rome during World War II
- John Kappler (born 1943), professor in the Department of Integrated Immunology at National Jewish Health
- Nathalie Käppler (formerly von Lahnstein), fictional character on the German soap opera Verbotene Liebe
