= Janet Morgan, Lady Balfour of Burleigh =

Canadian-born English writer (born 1945)

Janet Patricia Morgan, Dowager Lady Balfour of Burleigh CBE, FRSE (born December 1945) is a Canadian-born English writer.

The daughter of Dr. Frank Morgan and Sheila Saddler, she was born Janet Morgan in Montreal while her father was working on a top-secret British atomic research project, the Montreal Laboratory. She returned to England with her family before the end of World War II. She earned a MA and PhD. She was named a Commander in the Order of the British Empire in 2008. She is a fellow of the Royal Society of Edinburgh.

In 1993, she married Robert Bruce, Lord Balfour of Burleigh.

She has been chair of the Scottish Cultural Resources Access Network, the Nuclear Liabilities Fund and the Nuclear Trust. She has served as a director of the Scottish Oriental Smaller Companies Trust and Murray International Trust.

Morgan wrote a biography of Agatha Christie that was authorised by the writer's family. She also wrote biographies of Edwina Mountbatten and George Bruce, her father-in-law and the previous Lord Balfour of Burleigh. She was editor for The Backbench Diaries of Richard Crossman.
