= Robert Balfour, 2nd Lord Balfour of Burleigh =

Scottish military commander

Robert Balfour, 2nd Lord Balfour of Burleigh (died 18 August 1663) was a Scottish military commander.

Balfour was son of Sir Robert Arnot of Fernie, chamberlain of Fife. He married Margaret, daughter of Michael Balfour of Burleigh and Margaret, daughter of Lundie of Lundie, and his wife succeeded her father (who was created Lord Balfour of Burleigh on 7 August 1606) as Baroness Balfour of Burleigh. Thereupon, by a letter from King James VI, Arnot became Lord Balfour of Burleigh, the second holder of the title.

At the assembly of the Scottish parliament in 1640 (11 June) the 'estates' appointed him their president. He was continued in the office in 1641, and was one of the commissioners for a treaty of peace with England in 1640–1. He was also constituted of the privy council ad vitam aut culpam by the parliament of Scotland 11 November 1641. During the wars of Montrose he was energetic on the side of the government. He assumed military command, but was not successful. Montrose defeated him 12 September 1644 near Aberdeen, and again (with General Baillie) at Kilsyth, 15 August 1645. He was opposed to the celebrated and unfortunate 'engagement' to march into England for the rescue of the king. He had weight enough to dissuade Cromwell then from the invasion of Scotland. In 1649, under the act for putting 'the kingdom in a posture of defence,' he was one of the colonels for Fife. He was further nominated in the same year one of the commissioners of the treasury and exchequer. He died at Burleigh, near Kinross, 10 or 18 August 1663.

His wife died before him (in 1639). They had one son, John, 3rd Lord Balfour of Burleigh, and four daughters, including Anna Balfour (died 1649), who married David Wemyss, 2nd Earl of Wemyss in 1627.
