= Brucefield House =

Country house in Clackmannanshire, Scotland

Coordinates: 56°06′24″N 3°40′45″W

- Interactive map of the Brucefield House area

General information
- Type: Category A listed building
- Location: Clackmannanshire, Scotland
- Completed: 1724

Design and construction
- Architect: Alexander Bruce

Brucefield is an 18th-century country house in Clackmannanshire, Scotland. It is located 4 kilometres (2.5 mi) east of Clackmannan. The house was largely built in 1724 by Alexander Bruce, younger of Kennet. It was restored in the early 20th century, and is now protected as a Category A listed building.

== History ==
Alexander Bruce was a soldier who fought in Flanders during the War of the Spanish Succession, and also fought on the government side during the Jacobite rising of 1715. Bruce married Mary Balfour, daughter of Robert Balfour, 4th Lord Balfour of Burleigh, in 1714. Ten years later he built or substantially remodelled the house of Brucefield. The location of the house was described by the diarist John Ramsay of Ochtertyre as being "upon the top of a moor without a tree". The house passed to Alexander's son Robert (1718–1785), who became a Lord of Session under the title Lord Kennet.

Around 1758 he sold Brucefield House to George Abercromby of Tullibody, whose daughter he had married in 1754. George Abercromby's son, Sir Ralph Abercromby (1734–1801), was a prominent soldier in the Napoleonic Wars. During the 1930s the house was restored for the Bruce family by the architect James Shearer. It is now the home of the current Lady Balfour of Burleigh, a descendant of the 4th Lord Balfour of Burleigh through the Bruces of Kennet.

== Architectural history ==
Brucefield House comprises a three-storey central block, with a three-storey northern pavilion, and a two-storey pavilion to the south. Different interpretations of the development of the house have been published. Adam Swan states that the 18th-century house was a rebuilding of the 15th-century hunting lodge of Hartshaw, belonging to the Stewarts of Rosyth, and that the stone spiral stair in the north pavilion is a surviving part of this. According to this interpretation, Alexander Bruce remodelled the existing building in a contemporary style, and added the south pavilion. However, the Stirling and Central Scotland volume of the Buildings of Scotland series suggests that the central block was newly built in 1724, and attributes the south pavilion to c.1760, and the north pavilion to the early 19th century.

The original entrance was on the east front, where a window now takes the place of the main door. A 19th-century porch now forms the entrance from the west. Above the porch is a panel carved with the arms of Alexander Bruce and Mary Balfour. This panel was moved to the Bruce's other property, Kennet House (now demolished) in 1760, but was returned during the 1930s restorations. The interiors were mostly remodelled at the same time, though several 18th-century chimney pieces survive.

An 18th-century walled garden is located to the south of the house. To the north is Brucefield Mains, the former stables, which dates from the early 18th century and was restored as a dwelling in 2009. The main feature of the stables is the central tower containing a doocot (pigeon house).
