= Francis Balfour (medical officer) =

Scottish medical officer and author

Francis Balfour (c. 1744 – 7 May 1818) was a Scottish medical officer and medical author who lived and worked primarily in British India.

== Biography ==
Balfour was born in Fife, the third son of Army officer Arthur Balfour, the great-grandson of the 3rd Lord Balfour of Burleigh by his second son, Lt. Col. John Balfour. Lt. Col. John Balfour was attainted for his role in the Jacobite rising of 1715, and his lands forfeited. King George II restored the Fernie estate to Arthur in 1739.

He was awarded his MD degree by the University of Edinburgh in 1767; his thesis was titled De Gonorrhea virulenta. He entered the East India Company's service in Bengal as assistant-surgeon on 3 July 1769, was appointed full surgeon on 10 August 1777, and retired from the service on 16 September 1807. He afterwards returned to Edinburgh.

Balfour lived for several years on terms of some intimacy with Warren Hastings. He dedicated a book — The Forms of Herkern — to him in 1781, and addressed him a letter in the same year complaining of the want of courtesy shown him by other officials in the East India service at Lucknow. In May, June, and July 1783, Balfour, while at Benares, corresponded frequently with Hastings in an abortive attempt to disclose a plot between the resident of Benares, Francis Fowke, and Rajah Cheyte Sing, which he claimed to have discovered. Balfour not only interested himself in politics and medicine, but devoted much time to Oriental studies.

The Forms of Herkern . . . translated into English, was published at Calcutta in 1781, and republished in London in 1804. It is a state letter-writer in Persian; a vocabulary is given by the translator at the end. Balfour was one of the earliest members of the Bengal Asiatic Society, founded, under the presidency of Sir William Jones and the patronage of Warren Hastings, in 1784. To the 'Asiatic Researches' ('Transactions of the Bengal Asiatic Society') Balfour contributed in 1790 a paper on Arabic roots, showing how the Arabic language had entered into the Persian and the language of Hindostan, and in 1805 a paper entitled 'Extracts from Tehzeebul Mantik; or the Essence of Logic, proposed as a small supplement to Arabic and Persian Grammar, and with a view to elucidate certain points connected with Oriental Literature'.

Balfour married a cousin, Emilia Balfour, in Madras in 1777. He succeeded to the Fernie estate following the death of his brother. He died there in 1818.

== Works ==
- Dissertatio de Gonorrhea Virulenta, 1767.
- A Treatise on Sol-Lunar Influence in Fevers, vol. i. Calcutta, 1784; 2nd ed. London, 1795; 3rd ed. Cupar, 1815; 4th ed. Cupar, 1816. A German translation of the book, with a preface by Herr Lauth, appeared at Strasburg in 1786. Balfour here expounds his favourite theory, that fevers are under the direct influence of the moon, and reach their critical stage with the full moon.
- Treatise on Putrid Intestinal Remitting Fevers, 1790; 2nd ed. 1795.
- A paper on the Barometer in the Asiatic Researches (iv. 195), 1795.
- A paper on the Diurnal Variations of the Barometer, Edinburgh Phil. Trans'. (iv. pt. i. 25), 1798.
- A paper on the Effects of Sol-Lunar Influence on the Fevers of India in Asiatic Researches (viii. 1), 1805.
