= James Balfour, 1st Baron Balfour of Glenawley =

Scottish nobleman and courtier

James Balfour, 1st Baron Balfour of Glenawley or Clonawley (c. 1567 – 18 October 1634), was a Scottish nobleman and courtier who was one of the chief undertakers in the Plantation of Ulster. His third marriage to Anne Blayney caused a notable scandal.

== Biography ==
Balfour was the second son of Lord Pittendreich, a judge, and Margaret Balfour, daughter and heiress of James Balfour of Burleigh Castle. His elder brother, Michael, was created Lord Balfour of Burleigh in 1609. (Baron Balfour of Glenawley is sometimes identified as the second son of the first Lord Balfour of Burleigh, but this appears to be an error.)

In 1573, James Balfour received in fee a charter for the lands at Costertoun in the lordship of Musselburgh from Robert Pitcairn, commendator of Dunfermline Abbey. In 1599, he was styled as feuar of Pitcullo. Balfour was a favourite of James VI and was knighted at some point. By 1617, he was referred to as Sir James Balfour of Pitcullo.

Along with the 1st Earl of Abercorn and the 1st Baron Castle Stuart, Balfour was among the most important of the ennobled "undertakers" — the English and Scots tasked with the colonisation of Ulster. Balfour was the largest planter in Fermanagh; in addition to the lands he received from the crown, he also purchased lands from his elder brother Lord Burleigh, also an undertaker. By 1641, his lands in the baronies of Knockninny and Magherastephana covered 8,275 acres (7,520 of which were turning a profit).

Sir James purchased his brother's land in Fermanagh by deed dated 7 January 1615. The land included Lisnaskea, where around 1620, he began construction on Castle Balfour.

On 8 November 1619, Balfour was created Baron Balfour of Glenawley (a Scoticisation of Clanawley) of Fermanagh, in the Peerage of Ireland. The title became extinct upon the death of his younger son, the third Baron (who had succeeded his elder brother), in 1636. The lordship of Glenawley was revived in 1661 for Hugh Hamilton, 1st Baron of Glenawley, whose wife, Arabella Susan Balfour of Pitcullo, was also a relative, a daughter of a Sir William Balfour, and a nephew of Lord Balfour's daughter Anne.

His uncle Michael Balfour of Mountwhanny, Commendator of Melrose Abbey, was the ancestor of the Balfours of Orkney. His younger brother William Balfour, who also settled in Ireland, was the ancestor of the Townley-Balfour family of Townley Hall, County Louth.

== Marriage and issue ==
Lord Balfour married three times. He married firstly a cousin, Grizel Balfour, daughter of Patrick Balfour and Katherine Ramsay, by whom he had three sons and three daughters. After 1599 he married secondly Lady Elizabeth Leslie, daughter of George Hay, 7th Earl of Erroll and Helen Bryson, who had divorced her first husband, Sir John Leslie, 10th Baron of Balquhain, for adultery shortly after their marriage in 1597.

He had three sons and three daughters from his first wife:

- James Balfour, 2nd Lord Balfour, Baron of Glenawley (died 16 February 1635), succeeded his father but shortly after decessit sine prole
- Alexander Balfour, 3rd Lord Balfour, Baron of Glenawley (died 1636). He married Anne Warren, widow of William Warren and the daughter of Sir Francis Goldsmith of Crayford, Kent. He succeeded his brother but the title became extinct upon his death without an heir.
- Pearce, died young
- Anne Balfour, married firstly, Sir John Wemyss, High Sheriff of Fermanagh, who was murdered as part of her father's feud with the Bishop of Clogher. She married, secondly, Archibald Hamilton, Archbishop of Cashel, son of Malcolm Hamilton or son of Sir Claude Hamilton. Her nephew Hugh Hamilton was created Lord of Glenawley in 1661.

His third wife was Hon. Anne Blayney, eldest daughter of Edward Blayney, 1st Baron Blayney and Anne Loftus, daughter of Adam Loftus, Archbishop of Dublin In the 1620s, Lord Balfour — "though an ancient man of great adge" — married the 15-year-old Anne, who brought a dowry of £1,200 (equivalent to £299,000 in 2025), with the agreement that Anne would be granted jointure lands worth £300.

After the wedding, 'which was done on both sides with more haste than good speed', Balfour reneged on the marriage settlement on the grounds that another man 'had abused his wife both before his marriage with her and after'. Under duress, Anne confessed to her infidelities and a lengthy and very public lawsuit ensued that threatened to bankrupt her father, Lord Blayney (something that Balfour had fully intended). The causes that induced her to accuse herself in a matter of unchastity, to her own and her parents' dishonour' puzzled the king, who then instructed the two peers to settle the 'unnatural' dispute without bringing further shame to all concerned.

Lord Balfour complained to the King about his dispute with the Blayneys, claiming they were receiving preferential treatment, which led to a feud with James Spottiswood, the Bishop of Clogher. The feud came to a head in 1626 when Lord Balfour's son-in-law Sir John Wemyss was murdered by the bishop's men. All of this was very costly and despite his land holdings, Lord Balfour was financially ruined. In June 1634 sold his estate for a little over £3,000 to Sir William Balfour, keeper of the Tower of London, who was probably his cousin.

Lord Balfour died in London in October 1634 and was buried at St Ann Blackfriars (destroyed in the Great Fire of London in 1666). His will, dated shortly before his death, was proved by probate in Dublin on 5 March 1635 but was probated again the following June. Balfour apparently died intestate and his two sons sued each other and his will was not proved until June 1636, by which time at least one of his sons had died.

Peerage of Ireland
New creation	Baron Balfour of Glenawley; 1619–1634	Succeeded by James Balfour
