= David Balfour =

David Balfour may refer to:

- David Balfour (1574–1634), Scottish-Danish shipbuilder, director of Bremerholm
- David Balfour, the main character and narrator in the books Kidnapped and Catriona by Robert Louis Stevenson
- David Balfour, an alternative title to the above-mentioned novel Catriona
- David A. Balfour (1889–1956), Canadian politician
  - David A. Balfour Park named after the same politician
- David Paton Balfour (1841–1894), New Zealand sheepfarmer, station manager, roading supervisor and diarist

== See also ==
- Balfour (surname)
