= John Balfour, 3rd Lord Balfour of Burleigh =

Scottish nobleman

John Balfour, 3rd Lord Balfour of Burleigh (after 1606 – died 1696/97) was a Scottish nobleman. He was educated in France; and has been traditionally and erroneously styled Covenanter John Balfour, the Covenanter being John Balfour of Kinloch.

== Biography ==
Balfour was the son of Margaret Balfour, daughter of Michael, Lord Balfour of Burleigh, and Robert Arnot. Arnot, who had been unofficially adopted by Michael, married Margaret in 1606, and took the name Balfour in order to inherit Michael's estates and title.

In his youth, Balfour went to France for his education. He was wounded there in an "affair of honour" (duel). He returned home through London early in 1649 and without his father's permission, married Isabel, daughter of another scion of his house — Sir William Balfour of Pitcullo, Fife, Constable of the Tower of London. The young married pair set off for Scotland in March. Balfour's father was against the marriage and unsuccessfully attempted to get the marriage annulled. The displeasure took the preposterous shape of asking the general assembly of the kirk of Scotland to annul the marriage. The petition was quietly shelved. The plea for the dissolution of the tie was "the open wound" he still bore, and which paternal wrath deemed a disqualification for marriage.

Balfour succeeded his father as Lord Balfour of Burleigh, in 1663.

This Lord Balfour of Burleigh has been traditionally styled "Covenanter", which he assuredly never was. On Sir Walter Scott must be laid the blame — if blame it be — by having appropriated the name and designation in his "John Balfour of Burley" in Old Mortality.

John Balfour, the "Covenanter", was historically "of Kinloch", not of Burleigh, and the principal actor in the assassination of Archbishop Sharp in 1679. For this crime his estate was forfeited and a large reward offered for his capture. He fought at Drumclog and at Bothwell Bridge, and is said to have escaped to Holland, and to have there tendered his services to the Prince of Orange.

It is generally supposed that John Balfour of Burley died at sea on a return voyage to Scotland. But in the New Statistical Account of Scotland, under "Roseneath", strong presumptions are stated for believing that he never left Scotland, but found an asylum in the parish of Roseneath, Dunbartonshire, under the wing of the Argyll family. According to this account, having assumed the name of Salter, his descendants continued there for many generations, the last of the family dying in 1815. Scott noted in his Old Mortality that in 1808 a Lieutenant-Colonel Balfour de Burleigh was commandant of the troops of the King of Holland in the West Indies.

With Isobel, he had three sons and six daughters:

- Robert, 4th Lord Balfour of Burleigh, married Lady Margaret Melville, daughter of the Earl of Melville. He was the father of the 5th Lord Balfour who infamously escaped from prison disguised as a woman.
- Lt.-Col. John Balfour of Fernie (died 8 September 1725), married Barbara Ross, daughter of Rev. Arthur Ross. He was found guilty of high treason for Jacobite rebellion of 1715 and was forced to forfeit his estates.
- Henry Balfour (1708 – 31 July 1764), Member of Parliament of Scotland for Fife, major in the Royal Scots Greys
- Margaret (died 20 October 1734), married in 1670 to Andrew Rollo, 3rd Lord Rollo
- Isabel, died unmarried.
- Emilia (c. 1658 – 12 January 1732, married to Sir John Malcolm of Lochore and Innertiel
- Jean, married, first, to George Oliphant of Gask, and secondly, to Sir Robert Douglas of Kirkness
- Susan, possibly married to Robert Douglas of Strathendry.
- Anne (born 10 March 1670), possibly married to Captain Robert Sinclair.

Lord Balfour died between 10 December 1696 and 27 February 1697.

== Notes ==
Peerage of Scotland
Preceded by Robert Balfour	Lord Balfour of Burleigh; 1663–1688	Succeeded by Robert Balfour
