= Anna Balfour =

Scottish aristocrat

Anna Balfour (died 1649) was a Scottish aristocrat who compiled a recipe book and, with her daughters, a manuscript of lute songs.

== Family ==
She was a daughter of Robert Balfour, 2nd Lord Balfour of Burleigh (born Robert Arnot), and his wife Margaret, a daughter of Michael Balfour, 1st Lord Balfour of Burleigh.

== Marriage ==
She married David Wemyss, 2nd Earl of Wemyss (1610–1679) in January 1627. At first, according to a marriage contract, they were to live with his father at Wemyss Castle or at a house known as the Chapel of Wemyss. In 1634 Anna Balfour had two gentlewomen companions and two maids called "quins". A "quine" was a Scottish word for a serving woman. They had a herb garden at the Chapel of Wemyss.

David Wemyss was known as the Master of Wemyss. When his father became Earl of Wemyss he was called "Lord Elcho". Anna Balfour, Lady Elcho compiled a book of medical and culinary recipes which was continued by her daughter, Jean, Countess of Sutherland. Her daughter wrote, "This book was my mothers in w[hi]ch are many Receits wch shee had from the most famous Phisitians that lived in her tyme".

== Children ==
During her pregnancies she consulted an Edinburgh physician, David Arnot, who gave her talismans of a stone and a belt. She wrote that the stone was for "the weimen in traveill". Stones used as amulets may have been eagle stone geodes. Her children included:

- Jean Wemyss (1629–1715), who married (1) on 26 April 1649, at Wemyss Castle, Archibald Douglas, 1st Earl of Ormond (2), George Gordon, 15th Earl of Sutherland. She lived at Dunrobin Castle.
- Margaret Wemyss (1630–1648), who was involved with her sister and mother in compiling a manuscript of lute music now known as the "Wemyss manuscript".

== Death ==
Anna Balfour, Lady Elcho died on 10 November 1649.

== Legacy ==
Both the recipe book and the music manuscript are now held by the National Library of Scotland.
