= Padure Manor =

Manor house in Latvia

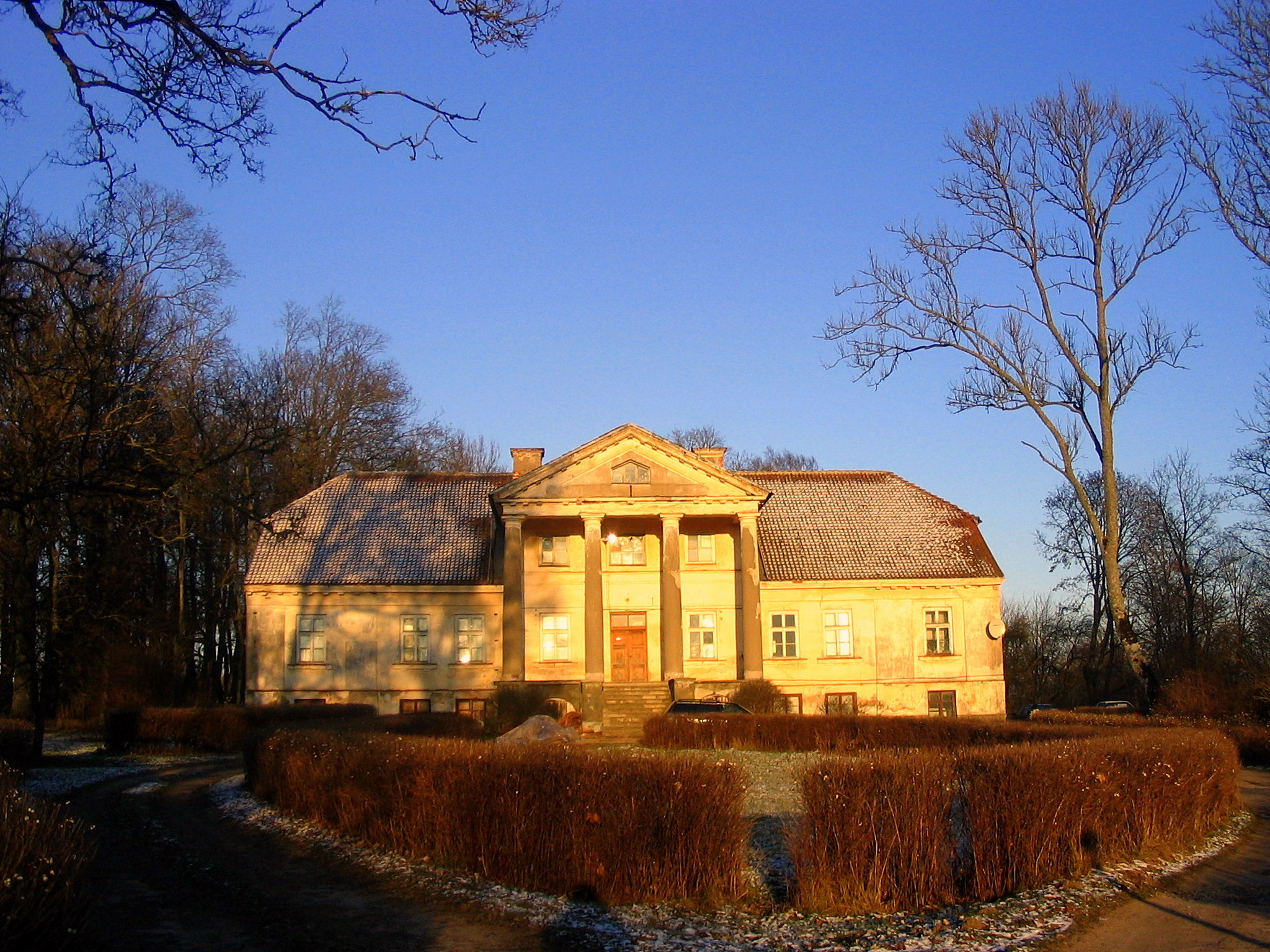
- Padure Manor

- Location within Latvia
- Interactive map of the Padure Manor area

General information
- Architectural style: Empire style
- Location: Padure parish, Latvia
- Coordinates: 57°1′11″N 21°54′30″E
- Completed: early 1840s

Padure Manor (Latvian: Padures muižas pils) is a manor house built in empire style located about 200 metres from a large pond formed by the waters of the Venta river, in Padure Parish, Kuldīga Municipality, Latvia. Used as a war hospital during the German occupation in the Second World War, it housed the Padure parish library until 2005.

== History ==
The manor house was erected in the late 1830s to the early 1840s. The first owner was the Scottish merchant John Louis Balfour who acquired the property from the von Stempel family, who owned the Padure estate and Turkalne Manor. His eldest son, Alfon Balfour, managed the estate until the beginning of the 1920s. After the Latvian Agrarian Reform was instituted, from 1922 the manor was managed by the government of Latvia.

From 1 April 1923, a school was opened. During the German occupation the manor served as a war hospital and after 1945, the buildings of the estate began to be used as an agricultural experimental station. Until 2005, the manor housed the Padure parish library.

== See also ==
- List of palaces and manor houses in Latvia
