= Strange Case of Dr Jekyll and Mr Hyde =

1886 novella by Robert Louis Stevenson

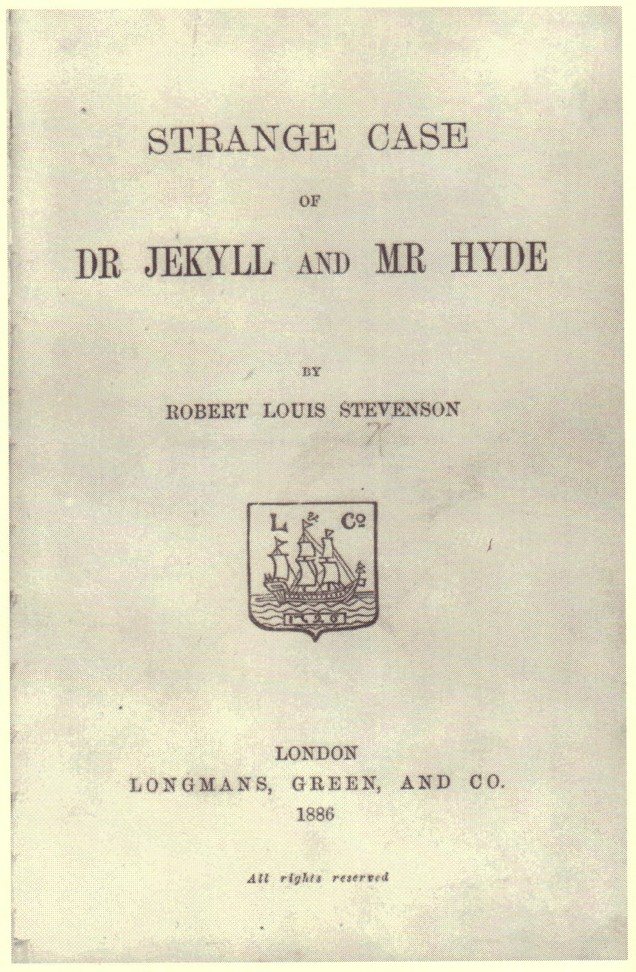
- Title page of the first London edition (1886)
- Author: Robert Louis Stevenson
- Original title: Strange Case of Dr Jekyll and Mr Hyde
- Language: English
- Genre: Gothic; horror; detective; science fiction
- Publisher: Longmans, Green & Co.
- Publication date: 5 January 1886
- Publication place: United Kingdom
- Pages: 141 (first edition)
- ISBN: 978-0-553-21277-8
- Text: Strange Case of Dr Jekyll and Mr Hyde at Wikisource

Strange Case of Dr Jekyll and Mr Hyde (Note: Stevenson titled the book without "The" in the beginning for reasons unknown, but it has been supposed to increase the "strangeness" of the case. Later publishers added "The" to make it grammatically correct, but it was not the author's original intention. The story is often known today simply as Dr Jekyll and Mr Hyde or even Jekyll and Hyde.) is an 1886 Gothic horror novella by Scottish author Robert Louis Stevenson. It follows Gabriel John Utterson, a London-based legal practitioner who investigates a series of strange occurrences between his old friend, Dr Henry Jekyll, and a murderous criminal named Edward Hyde.

Strange Case of Dr Jekyll and Mr Hyde is considered to be a defining book of the gothic literature genre. The novella has also had an impact on popular culture, with the phrase "Jekyll and Hyde" being used in vernacular to refer to people with an outwardly good but sometimes shockingly evil nature.

== Inspiration and writing ==
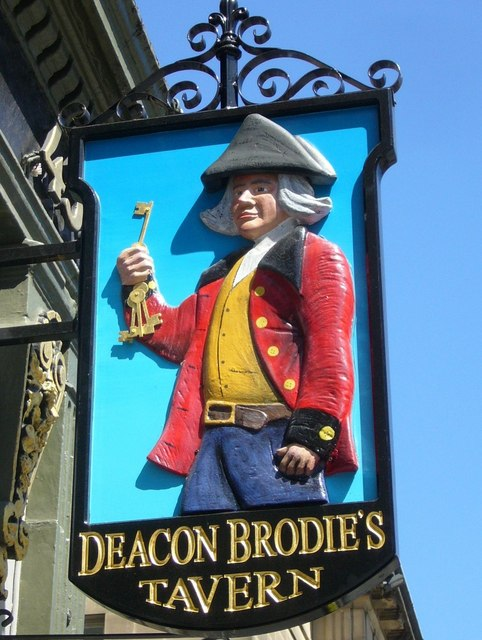
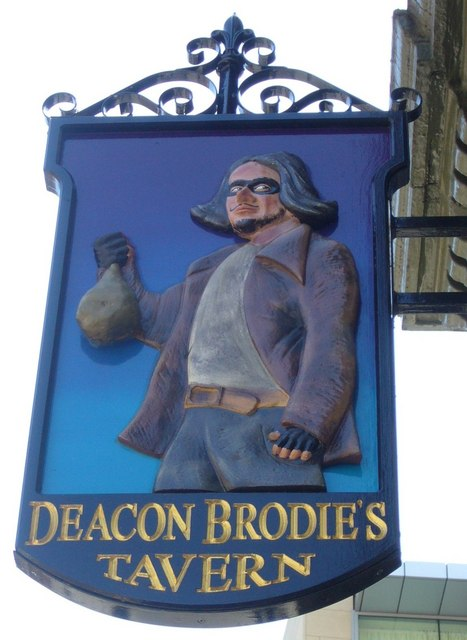
Tavern sign depicting the 18th-century Edinburgh figure Deacon Brodie: by day, a respectable citizen; by night, a thief. He was an inspiration for Jekyll and Hyde.

Stevenson had long been intrigued by the idea of how human personalities can reflect the interplay of good and evil. While still a teenager, he developed a script for a play about William Brodie, a Scottish cabinet-maker, deacon of a trades guild, and Edinburgh city councillor, who maintained a secret life as a burglar in order to fund his mistresses and gambling addiction, which Stevenson later reworked with the help of W. E. Henley and which was produced for the first time in 1882.

Inspiration may also have come from the writer's friendship with an Edinburgh-based French teacher, Eugène Chantrelle, who was convicted and executed for the murder of his wife in May 1878. Chantrelle, who had appeared to lead a normal life in the city, poisoned his wife with opium. According to author Jeremy Hodges, Stevenson was present throughout the trial and as "the evidence unfolded he found himself, like Dr Jekyll, 'aghast before the acts of Edward Hyde'." Moreover, it was believed that the teacher had committed other murders both in France and Britain by poisoning his victims at supper parties with a "favourite dish of toasted cheese and opium".

Stevenson was friends with homosexual men, including Horatio Brown, Edmund Gosse, and John Addington Symonds, and the duality of their socially suppressed selves may have shaped his book. Symonds was shocked by the book, writing to Stevenson that "viewed as an allegory, it touches one too closely."

According to Stevenson's essay "A Chapter on Dreams" (Scribner's, Jan. 1888), after racking his brains for days over a possible plot for the story, he had a dream that gave him "three scenes, and the central idea of a voluntary change becoming involuntary". Biographer Graham Balfour quoted Stevenson's wife, Fanny Stevenson:

In the small hours of one morning,[...] I was awakened by cries of horror from Louis. Thinking he had a nightmare, I awakened him. He said angrily: "Why did you wake me? I was dreaming a fine bogey tale." I had awakened him at the first transformation scene.

Lloyd Osbourne, Stevenson's stepson, wrote: "I don't believe that there was ever such a literary feat before as the writing of Dr Jekyll. I remember the first reading as though it were yesterday. Louis came downstairs in a fever; read nearly half the book aloud; and then, while we were still gasping, he was away again, and busy writing. I doubt if the first draft took so long as three days."

As was customary, Mrs Stevenson would read the draft and offer her criticisms in the margins. Stevenson was confined to bed at the time from a haemorrhage. In her comments in the manuscript, she observed that in effect the story was really an allegory, but Stevenson was writing it as a story. After a while, Stevenson called her back into the bedroom and pointed to a pile of ashes: he had burnt the manuscript in fear that he would try to salvage it, and thus forced himself to start again from nothing, writing an allegorical story as she had suggested. Scholars debate whether he really burnt his manuscript; there is no direct factual evidence for the burning, but it remains an integral part of the history of the novella. In another version of the story, Stevenson came downstairs to read the manuscript for his wife and stepson. Enraged by his wife's criticism, he went back to his room, only to come back later admitting she was right. He then threw the original draft into the fire, and stopped his wife and stepson from rescuing it.

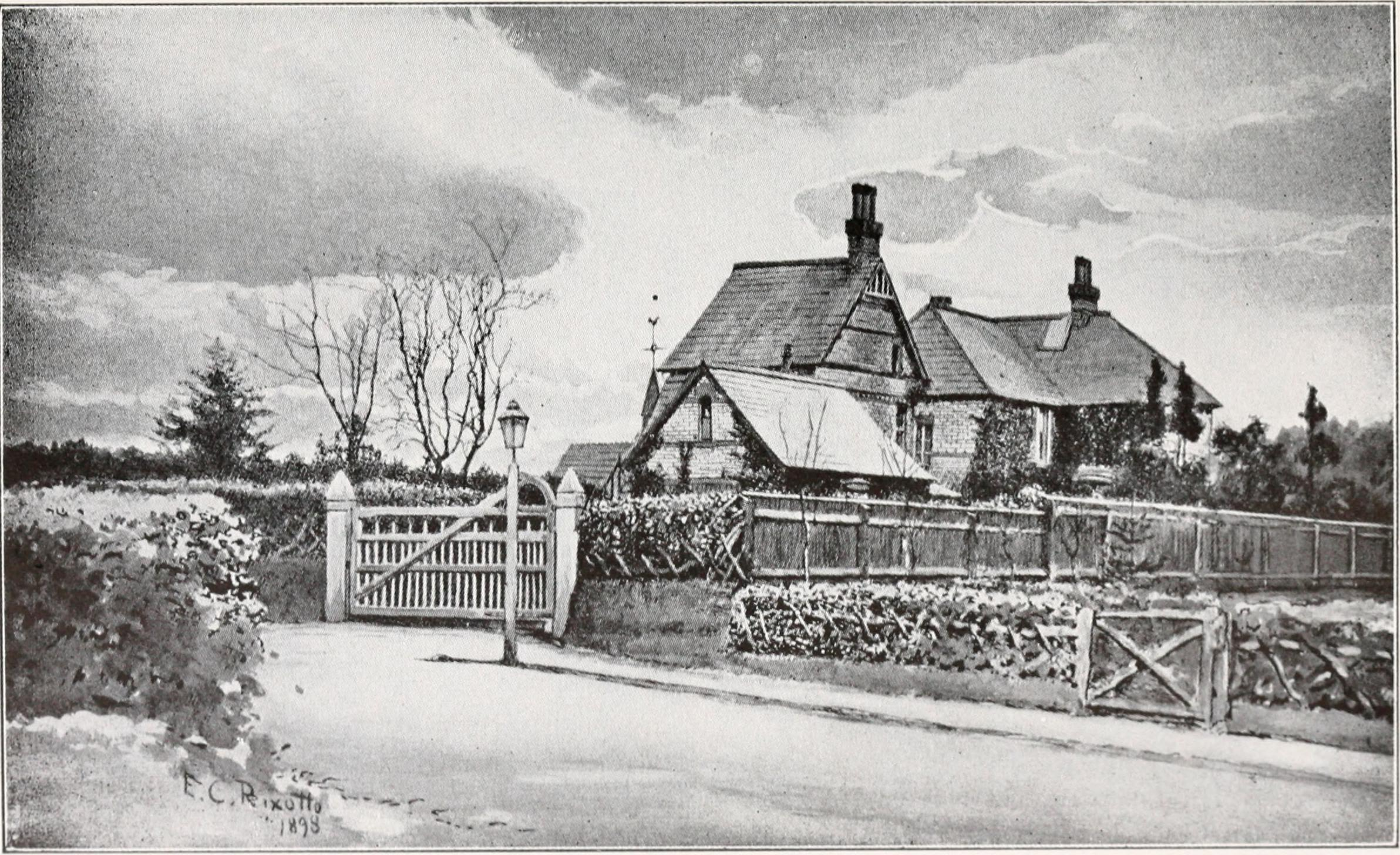
Stevenson's house Skerryvore in the southern English coastal town of Bournemouth where he wrote Strange Case of Dr Jekyll and Mr Hyde

The novella was written in the southern English seaside town of Bournemouth in Dorset, where Stevenson had moved in 1884, because his stepson was at school there and to benefit from its mild climate, sea air and the aroma of its many resinous pine trees. Stevenson rewrote the story in three to six days. The original dream may have been stimulated by the medication Stevenson was receiving: ergotine (to stop lung hemorrhaging), derived from ergot, which could induce hallucinations, and possibly cocaine (at the time being investigated for medical benefits), though we have no direct evidence of this. However, there is no reason to believe he was "on drugs" when he wrote the work. According to Osbourne, "The mere physical feat was tremendous, and, instead of harming him, it roused and cheered him inexpressibly". He continued to refine the work for four to six weeks after the initial revision.

== Plot summary ==
Mr Utterson, a reserved and morally upright lawyer, and his lighthearted cousin Mr Enfield are on their weekly walk when they reach the door of a mysterious, unkempt house located down a by-street in a bustling quarter of London. Enfield recounts to Utterson that months prior, he witnessed a malevolent-looking man named Edward Hyde deliberately trample a young girl after a seemingly minor collision. Enfield forced Hyde to pay her family a large sum of money to avoid a scandal. Hyde brought Enfield to this door and gave him a cheque signed by a reputable gentleman later revealed to be Dr Henry Jekyll, Utterson's friend and client. Utterson fears Hyde is blackmailing Jekyll, as Jekyll recently changed his will to make Hyde the sole beneficiary in the event of Jekyll's death or disappearance. When Utterson tries to discuss Hyde with Jekyll, Jekyll says he can get rid of Hyde when he wants and asks him to drop the matter.

A year later in October, a servant sees Hyde beat Sir Danvers Carew, another one of Utterson's clients, to death and leave behind half a broken cane. The police contact Utterson, who leads officers to Hyde's apartment. Hyde has vanished, but they find the other half of the broken cane, which Utterson recognises as one he had given to Jekyll. Utterson visits Jekyll, who produces a note allegedly written to Jekyll by Hyde, apologising for the trouble that he has caused. However, Hyde's handwriting is similar to Jekyll's own, leading Utterson to conclude that Jekyll forged the note to protect Hyde.

For two months, Jekyll reverts to his former sociable manner, appearing almost rejuvenated, but in early January, he abruptly begins refusing all visitors, deepening the mystery and concern surrounding his behaviour. Dr Hastie Lanyon, a mutual friend of Jekyll and Utterson, dies of shock after receiving information relating to Jekyll. Before his death, Lanyon gives Utterson a letter to be opened after Jekyll's death or disappearance. In late February, during another walk with Enfield, Utterson starts a conversation with Jekyll at his laboratory window. Jekyll suddenly slams the window shut and disappears, shocking and concerning Utterson.

In early March, Jekyll's butler Poole visits Utterson and says Jekyll has secluded himself in his laboratory for weeks. Utterson and Poole break into the laboratory and find Hyde's lifeless body grotesquely draped in Jekyll's clothes, with the scene suggesting a suicide. They find a letter from Jekyll to Utterson. Utterson reads Lanyon's letter, then Jekyll's.

Lanyon's letter reveals his deterioration resulted from the shock of seeing Hyde drink an elixir that turned him into Jekyll. Jekyll's letter explains he held himself to strict moral standards publicly, but indulged in unstated vices and struggled with shame. He found a way to transform himself and thereby indulge his vices without fear of detection. Jekyll's transformed body, Hyde, was evil, self-indulgent, and uncaring to anyone but himself. Initially, Jekyll controlled the transformations with the serum, but one night in August, he became Hyde involuntarily in his sleep.

Jekyll resolved to cease becoming Hyde. Despite this, one night he faltered and drank the serum. Hyde, his desires having been caged for so long, killed Carew. Horrified, Jekyll tried more adamantly to stop the transformations. Then, in early January, he transformed involuntarily while awake. Far from his laboratory and hunted by the police as a murderer, Hyde, needing help to avoid capture, wrote to Lanyon in Jekyll's hand, asking him to bring chemicals from his laboratory. In Lanyon's presence, Hyde mixed the chemicals, drank the serum, and transformed into Jekyll. The shock of the sight instigated Lanyon's deterioration and death. Meanwhile, Jekyll's involuntary transformations increased in frequency and required ever larger doses of the serum to reverse. One of these transformations caused Jekyll to slam his window shut on Utterson.

Eventually, the supply of salt used in the serum ran low, and subsequent batches prepared from new stocks failed to work. Jekyll speculated that the original ingredient had some impurity that made it work. Realising that he would stay transformed as Hyde, Jekyll wrote out a full account of the events. Jekyll concludes by confessing that he is uncertain whether Hyde will face execution or muster the courage to end his own life, but it no longer matters to him: Jekyll's consciousness is fading fast, and whatever fate awaits, it is Hyde's alone to endure.

== Characters ==
=== Mr Utterson ===
Gabriel John Utterson, a lawyer, has been a close loyal friend of Jekyll and Lanyon for many years. Utterson is a measured and, at all times, emotionless bachelor – who nonetheless seems believable, trustworthy, tolerant of the faults of others, and indeed genuinely likeable. However, Utterson is not immune to guilt, as he is quick to investigate and judge an interest in others' downfalls, which creates a spark of interest not only in Jekyll but also regarding Hyde. He concludes that human downfall results from indulging oneself in topics of interest. As a result of this line of reasoning, he lives life as a recluse and "dampens his taste for the finer items of life". Utterson concludes that Jekyll lives life as he wishes by enjoying his occupation.

=== Dr Henry Jekyll / Mr Edward Hyde ===
Based in Soho in London's West End, Dr Jekyll is a "large, well-made, smooth-faced man of fifty with something of a slyish cast", who sometimes feels he is battling between the good and evil within himself, leading to the struggle between his dual personalities of Henry Jekyll and Edward Hyde. He has spent a great part of his life trying to repress evil urges that were not fitting for a man of his stature. He creates a serum, or potion, in an attempt to separate this hidden evil from his personality. In doing so, Jekyll transformed into the smaller, younger, cruel, remorseless, and evil Hyde. Jekyll has many friends and an amiable personality, but as Hyde, he becomes mysterious and violent. As time goes by, Hyde grows in power. After taking the potion repeatedly, he no longer relies upon it to unleash his inner demon, i.e., his alter ego. Eventually, Hyde grows so strong that Jekyll becomes reliant on the potion to remain conscious throughout the book.

=== Mr Enfield ===
Richard Enfield is Utterson's cousin and is a well-known "man about town". He first sees Hyde at about three in the morning in an episode that is well documented as Hyde is deliberately trampling over a little girl. He is the person who mentions to Utterson the actual personality of Jekyll's friend, Hyde. Enfield witnessed Hyde recklessly running over a little girl in the street and the group of witnesses, with the girl's parents and other residents, force Hyde into writing a cheque for the girl's family. Enfield discovers that Jekyll signed the cheque, which is genuine. He says that Hyde is disgusting-looking but finds himself stumped when asked to describe the man.

=== Dr Lanyon ===
Dr Hastie Lanyon is a longtime friend of Dr Jekyll, and disagrees with Jekyll's "scientific" concepts, which Lanyon describes as "...too fanciful". He is the first person to discover Hyde's true identity when Hyde transforms himself back into Jekyll in Lanyon's presence. Lanyon helps Utterson solve the case when he describes the letter given to him by Jekyll and his thoughts and reactions to the transformation. After he witnesses the transformation process (and subsequently hears Jekyll's private confession, made to him alone), Lanyon becomes shocked into critical illness and, later, death.

=== Poole ===
Poole is Jekyll's butler who has been employed by him for many years. Poole serves Jekyll faithfully and attempts to be loyal to his master, but the growing changes and reclusiveness of his master cause him tremendous concern. Fearing that his master has been murdered and that his murderer, Mr Hyde, is residing in Jekyll's chambers, Poole enlists the aid of Mr Utterson. Joining forces, the two men uncover the truth. He chops down the door towards Jekyll's lab to aid Utterson in the climax.

=== Inspector Newcomen ===
Utterson joins this Scotland Yard inspector after the murder of Sir Danvers Carew. They explore Hyde's loft in Soho and discover evidence of his depraved life.

=== Sir Danvers Carew, MP ===
An aged, kindly, Member of Parliament. The maid claims that Hyde, in a murderous rage, killed Carew in the streets of London on an October night. At the time of his death, Carew is carrying on his person a letter addressed to Utterson, and the broken half of one of Jekyll's walking sticks is found by his body.

=== Maid ===
A maid, whose employer – presumably Jekyll – Hyde had once visited, is the only person who has witnessed the murder of Sir Danvers Carew. She saw Hyde murder Carew with Jekyll's cane and his feet. Having fainted after seeing what happened, she then wakes up and rushes to the police, thus initiating the murder case of Sir Danvers Carew.

== Analysis of themes ==
Richard Mansfield was mostly known for his dual role depicted in this double exposure. The stage adaptation opened in Boston in 1887, a year after the publication of the novella. Picture from 1895.

Literary genres that critics have applied as a framework for interpreting the novel include religious allegory, fable, detective story, sensation fiction, doppelgänger literature, Scottish devil tales, and Gothic novel.

=== Dualities ===
The novella is frequently interpreted as an examination of the duality of human nature, usually expressed as an inner struggle between good and evil, with variations such as human versus animal, civility versus barbarism sometimes substituted, the main point being that of an essential inner struggle between the one and other, and that the failure to accept this tension results in evil, or barbarity, or animal violence, being projected onto others. In Freudian theory, the thoughts and desires banished to the unconscious mind motivate the behaviour of the conscious mind. Banishing evil to the unconscious mind in an attempt to achieve perfect goodness can result in the development of a Mr Hyde-type aspect to one's character.

In Christian theology, Satan's fall from Heaven is due to his refusal to accept that he is a created being (that he has a dual nature) and is not God. This idea is suggested when Hyde says to Lanyon, shortly before drinking the famous potion: "your sight shall be blasted by a prodigy to stagger the unbelief of Satan." This is because, in Christianity, pride (to consider oneself as without sin or without evil) is a sin, as it is the precursor to evil itself.

In his discussion of the novel, Vladimir Nabokov argues that the "good versus evil" view of the novel is misleading, as Jekyll himself is not, by Victorian standards, a morally good person in some cases.

=== Id, ego and superego ===
According to Sigmund Freud's theory of id, ego and superego, which he introduced in 1920, Mr Hyde is the id which is driven by primal urges, instincts, and immediate gratification, the superego is represented by the expectations and morals of Victorian society, and Dr Jekyll is the rational and conscious ego which acts as a balance between the id and superego. When Jekyll transforms into Hyde, the ego is suppressed, and the id is no longer held back by either the ego or the superego.

=== Public vs. private ===
The work is commonly associated today with the Victorian concern over the public and private division, the individual's sense of playing a part and the class division of London. In this respect, the novella has also been noted as "one of the best guidebooks of the Victorian era" because of its piercing description of the fundamental dichotomy of the 19th century "outward respectability and inward lust", as this period had a tendency for social hypocrisy.

=== Scottish nationalism vs. union with Britain ===
Another interpretation sees the novella's duality as representative of Scotland and the Scottish character. In this reading, the duality represents the national and linguistic dualities inherent in Scotland's relationship with wider Britain and the English language, respectively, and also the repressive effects of the Church of Scotland on the Scottish character. A further parallel is also drawn with the city of Edinburgh itself, Stevenson's birthplace, which consists of two distinct parts: the old medieval section historically inhabited by the city's poor, where the dark crowded slums were rife with all types of crime, and the modern Georgian area of wide spacious streets representing respectability.

=== Addiction ===
Some scholars have argued that addiction or substance abuse is a central theme in the novella. Stevenson's depiction of Mr Hyde is reminiscent of descriptions of substance abuse in the nineteenth century. Daniel L. Wright describes Dr Jekyll as "not so much a man of conflicted personality as a man suffering from the ravages of addiction". Patricia Comitini argues that the central duality in the novella is in fact not Dr Jekyll and Mr Hyde but rather Dr Jekyll/Mr Hyde and Utterson, where Utterson represents the rational, unaddicted, ideal Victorian subject devoid of forbidden desires, and Dr Jekyll/Mr Hyde constitutes his opposite.

=== Darwin ===
The publication of The Origin of Species had a significant impact on Victorian society. Many did not fully understand the concepts of evolution, and assumed Charles Darwin meant humans had evolved directly from apes, and that if it was possible to evolve into humans, it was also possible to degenerate into something more ape-like and primitive. This was coined devolution, and was a prominent anxiety at the time. As Mr Hyde is described as a more primitive and less developed version of Dr Jekyll, and gradually Hyde becomes more bestial as his degeneration progresses, Stevenson can be seen to explore these anxieties in his work.

=== Homosexuality ===
The novel was written at a time when the Labouchere Amendment was published; criminalising homosexuality. The discourse on sex in general had become a secret and repressed desire, whereas homosexuality was not even to be thought about. It has been theorized that this could represent Mr Hyde, whose purpose is to fulfil all of Dr Jekyll's repressed desires. The lack of prominent women in the novel also help point to a homosexual interpretation, since there is a focus on romanticising bachelor boyhood for men. There were some things that Dr Jekyll did as Mr Hyde that he was too embarrassed to confess for, even on his deathbed, which could follow the historically-noted secrecy and shame of homosexuality in the Victorian era. Lanyon also refused to speak, sparing Jekyll the scandal and overall criminality of possibly being a homosexual.

== Reception ==
=== Publication ===
The book was initially sold as a paperback for one shilling in the UK. These books were called "shilling shockers" or penny dreadfuls. The American publisher Charles Scribner's Sons issued an "authorized edition" in New York on 5 January 1886, four days before the appearance of the first UK edition issued in London by Longmans, Green, and Co.; Scribner's published 3,000 copies, only 1,250 of them bound in cloth. Initially, stores did not stock it until a review appeared in The Times on 25 January 1886 giving it a favourable reception. Within the next six months, close to 40 thousand copies were sold. As Stevenson's biographer Graham Balfour wrote in 1901, the book's success was probably due rather to the "moral instincts of the public" than to any conscious perception of the merits of its art. It was read by those who never read fiction and quoted in pulpit sermons and in religious papers. By 1901, it was estimated to have sold over 250,000 copies in the United States.

=== Stage version ===
Although the book had initially been published as a "shilling shocker", it was an immediate success and one of Stevenson's best-selling works. Stage adaptations began in Boston and London and soon moved all across England and then towards his home country of Scotland.

The first stage adaptation followed the story's initial publication in 1886. Richard Mansfield bought the rights from Stevenson and worked with Boston author Thomas Russell Sullivan to write a script. The resulting play added to the cast of characters and some elements of romance to the plot. The addition of female characters to the originally male-centred plot continued in later adaptations of the story. The first performance of the play took place in the Boston Museum in May 1887. The lighting effects and makeup for Jekyll's transformation into Hyde created horrified reactions from the audience, and the play was so successful that production followed in London. After a successful 10 weeks in London in 1888, Mansfield was forced to close down production. The hysteria surrounding the Jack the Ripper serial murders led even those who only played murderers on stage to be considered suspects. When Mansfield was mentioned in London newspapers as a possible suspect for the crimes, he shut down production.

== Adaptations ==
The 1920 film Dr Jekyll and Mr Hyde

There have been numerous adaptations of the novella, including over 120 stage and film versions alone.

There have also been many audio recordings of the novella, with some of the more famous readers including Tom Baker, Roger Rees, Christopher Lee, Udo Kier, Anthony Quayle, Martin Jarvis, Tim Pigott-Smith, John Hurt, Ian Holm, Gene Lockhart, Richard Armitage, John Sessions, Alan Howard, Rory Kinnear and Richard E. Grant.

A 1990 musical based on the story was created by Frank Wildhorn, Steve Cuden, and Leslie Bricusse.

There have also been several video games based on the story, such as the 1988 Nintendo Entertainment System game Dr. Jekyll and Mr. Hyde, the 2001 PC game Jekyll and Hyde and the 2018 game MazM: Jekyll and Hyde.

== Illustrated versions ==
S.G. Hulme Beaman illustrated a 1930s edition, and in 1948 Mervyn Peake provided the newly founded Folio Society with memorable illustrations for the story.
