= Harriët Balfour =

Freed slave

Harriët Balfour m. Kirke
- Born: c. 1818; Woordtsburg, Berbice (nowadays part of New Amsterdam)
- Died: 3 December 1858; Nickerie, Suriname
- Spouse: David Kirke
- Parent(s): Daughter of an enslaved woman and James Balfour, a plantation owner from Dalgety, Fife.

Harriët Balfour also Schoonebeek and Kirke (c. 1818 — 3 December 1858) was a freed slave from Nickerie, Suriname.

== Biography ==
Balfour was the daughter of a slave woman and the plantation owner, Dr. James Balfour from Dalgety in Fife, Scotland. First mentioned in the slave registers of Berbice dated 1 February 1819, her details are given as "Premiere, ½ year old, mother: Diena", which means she was born in July or August 1818. Balfour was at the time practicing medicine in the British Colony of Berbice. Her mother, Diena, is registered as a 21-year-old black field worker, a slave belonging to the Dutchman Jan van der Woordt, who had been the first owner of the Woordtsburg plantation. When Balfour moved to Nickerie to run the Waterloo plantation in 1819, he indicated Premiere's name as either Premiere or Herriët.

By the late 1830s, James Balfour was the owner of 700 slaves and lived at Waterloo plantation with Harriët.

"A German soldier, August Kappler, who visited Balfour at Waterloo plantation in 1838, described him as an eccentric man ‘who had immeasurable wealth and was always working to obtain more’ but who, despite his success, lived ‘alone, without wife or children, except for a mulatto, who he fathered with one of his slaves’"

Born into slavery in the Dutch colony of Surinam, Harriët Balfour remained enslaved - even after the emancipation of slaves in the British colonies in 1834 - until her father died in 1841. Her father's funeral consisted of a feast presided over by his corpse in a coffin, to which all significant people in Nickerie were invited. He was then buried in a brick tomb, placed between the sugar mill and the slave houses – so that the slaves would continue to pass by him each day. Once a year, the grave was opened and cleaned until Amir Sankar, the owner of Waterloo since 1936, ended the ceremony.

The day before he died, Balfour published an official request for Herriet to be freed from slavery. He died on 13 July 1841 and Herriet's manumission was granted on 4 August. After her father's death, Herriet was briefly given the Dutch surname of Schoonebeek, one register recording her name as Henriette Schoonebeek. Jan van Schoonenbeek was the surveyor of the Woordtsburg plantation where she was born. On 29 December 1841, her name was officially changed to Herriet Balfour.

She married her first cousin, David Kirke in early 1842, and travelled with him to Scotland. She bore two daughters but both died young.

The couple then returned to Nickerie in 1848 and had a son, James who died when three years old.

== Death and legacy ==
Harriët Balfour died in Nickerie on 3 December 1858. Her husband had died in January 1850.

A Kirke family memorial commemorates her, her husband and children and stands in Cairneyhill in Fife.

== See also ==
- History of Suriname
- Slavery in Scotland
