= Francis Balfour =

Francis Balfour may refer to:

- Francis Balfour (medical officer) (c. 1744–1818), Anglo-Indian medical officer and medical author
- Francis Maitland Balfour (1851–1882), British biologist
- Francis Balfour (bishop) (1860–1924), assistant bishop of Bloemfontein
- Francis Balfour (colonial administrator) (1884–1965), British military officer and colonial administrator
