= Alexander Bruce, 6th Lord Balfour of Burleigh =

Scottish politician (1849–1921)

The Right Honourable The Lord Balfour of Burleigh KT GCMG GCVO PC JP DL
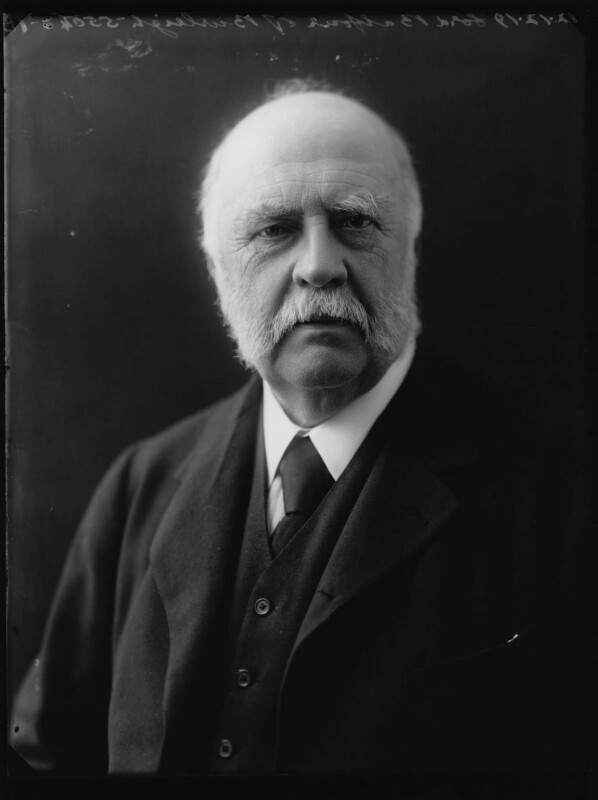
- Balfour in 1919

Secretary for Scotland
- In office 29 June 1895 – 9 October 1903
- Monarchs: Queen Victoria; Edward VII
- Prime Minister: The Marquess of Salisbury; Arthur Balfour
- Preceded by: Sir George Trevelyan, Bt
- Succeeded by: Andrew Murray

Personal details
- Born: 13 January 1849 Kennet, Clackmannanshire
- Died: 6 July 1921 (aged 72) Cadogan Square, London
- Party: Unionist
- Spouse(s): Lady Katherine Gordon (1852–1931)
- Education: Oriel College, Oxford

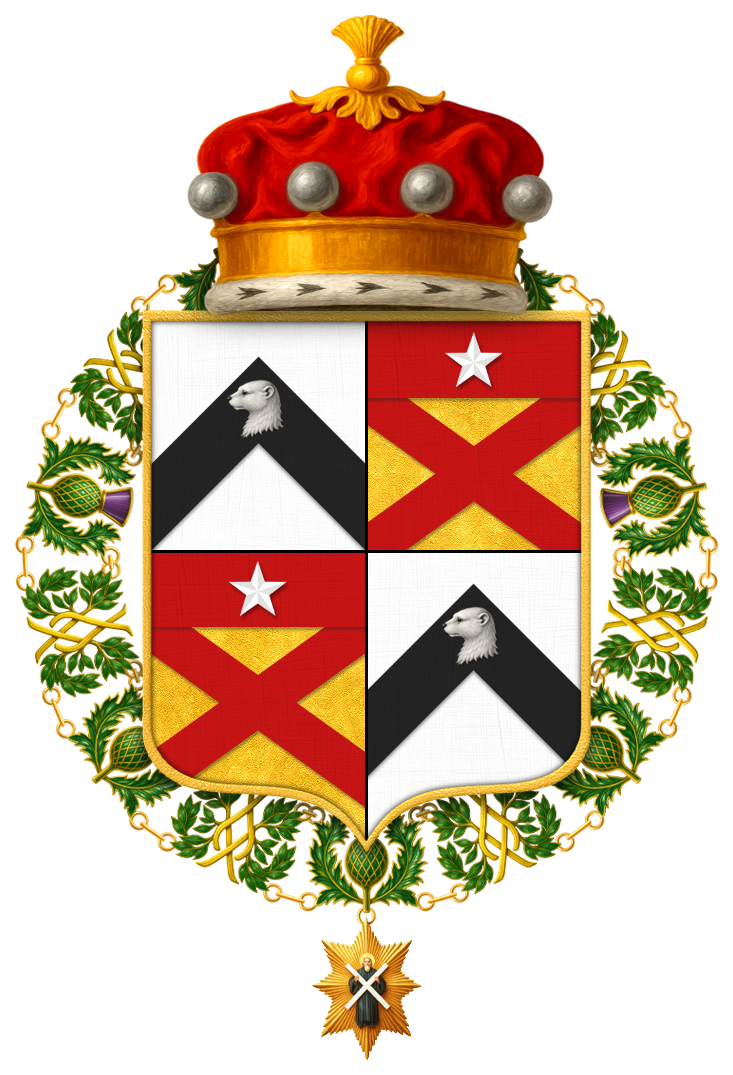
Shield of Arms of Alexander Hugh Bruce, 6th Lord Balfour of Burleigh, KT, GCMG, GCVO, PC, JP, DL

Alexander Hugh Bruce, 6th Lord Balfour of Burleigh, KT, GCMG, GCVO, PC, JP, DL (13 January 1849 – 6 July 1921) was a Scottish Unionist politician, banker and statesman, who took a leading part in the affairs of the Church of Scotland. He was Secretary for Scotland between 1895 and 1903.

== Background ==
The son of Robert Bruce, at one time Member of Parliament for Clackmannan, he was born in Kennet in that county and educated at Loretto, Eton and Oriel College, Oxford. In 1868, four years after his death, Robert Bruce's claim to the peerage was recognised by the House of Lords, and so his son became sixth Lord Balfour of Burleigh on the reversal of the title's attainder by Bruce's Restitution Act 1869 (32 & 33 Vict. c. 11 Pr.).

== Political career ==
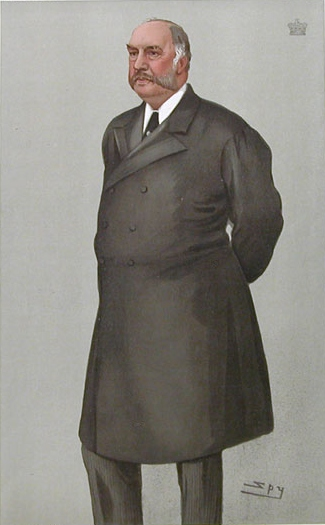
Caricature by Leslie Ward for Vanity Fair, 1902

In 1876 Balfour was elected a Scottish representative peer. Six years later, he was made an Education Commissioner for Scotland, and in 1887 he entered Lord Salisbury's administration as a Lord-in-waiting. The following year, Lord Balfour became Parliamentary Secretary to the Board of Trade, a position he held until the Liberals returned to power in 1892, and for three years he chaired the London Water Supply Commission until his return to government as Secretary for Scotland in 1895. On 4 February 1903, Balfour opened the new purpose-built Leith Nautical College.

Balfour was appointed a Knight of the Thistle in 1901. Balfour resigned office in 1903 with the split that occurred in the Conservative and Unionist Party over Joseph Chamberlain's campaign for tariff reform, a campaign which he opposed.

== Banking career ==
Balfour was Governor of the Bank of Scotland from 1904 to 1921.

== Other public appointments ==
Balfour was appointed Lord Rector of Edinburgh University (1896–1899), and elected Chancellor of St Andrews University in 1900, a post he held until his death. An active figure in the Church of Scotland, he was President of the World Missionary Conference held in Edinburgh in 1910, and was an important negotiator in the discussions on church union in Scotland which came to fruition in the 1920s. In 1916 he was appointed as chairman of the Committee on Commercial and Industrial Policy by Lloyd George and the economisers in the Cabinet in acknowledgement of his free trade credentials. In 1917 he was appointed convener of the Carnegie Trust for the Universities of Scotland. He became Lord Warden of the Stannaries in Cornwall and a member of the Council of the Prince of Wales in 1908.

== Honours ==
In June 1901 he received the honorary degree Doctor of Laws (LL.D) from the University of Glasgow, and later the same year he received the Freedom of the City of Glasgow ″for his services in facilitation legislation for the city″. The following May, he was at Carnavon to receive the honorary degree LL.D. (Legum Doctor) from the University of Wales during the ceremony to install the Prince of Wales (later King George V) as Chancellor of that university. In July 1902, he received the freedom of the city of St Andrews, "in testimony of his great services to the Scottish nation in many capacities, and especially of the conspicuous abilities with which he had discharged the onerous duties of Secretary for Scotland, and the deep interest he had shown in the cause of education and in promoting the welfare of the country."

He was appointed a Knight of the Thistle (KT) in March 1901, and invested by King Edward at Marlborough House on 18 March 1901. He was appointed a GCMG in 1911, and GCVO in 1917.

== History of Presbyterianism ==
Balfour wrote An Historical Account of the Rise and Development of Presbyterianism in Scotland, published in 1911 by the Cambridge University Press as part of their series Cambridge manuals of science and literature.

== Family ==
Balfour married Lady Katherine Eliza, youngest daughter of the George Hamilton-Gordon, 5th Earl of Aberdeen, in 1876. They had two sons and three daughters. His eldest son, Robert Bruce, Master of Burleigh, was killed in the First World War. After his death the heir to the lordship transferred to his second son, George John Gordon Bruce, 7th Lord Balfour of Burleigh (1883–1967).

His eldest daughter, Mary Bruce, married Sir John Augustus Hope, 16th Baronet. His younger daughter, Hon Victoria Alexandrina Katherine Bruce, had a career in the prison service and was the first woman Governor of a prison in Scotland.

Lord Burleigh of Balfour died at Cadogan Square, London, in July 1921, aged 72. He was buried in Clackmannan Churchyard. Lady Balfour of Burleigh died in February 1931, aged 78.

Political offices
Preceded by The Earl of Onslow	Lord-in-waiting; 1887–1889	Succeeded by The Viscount Torrington
Preceded by The Earl of Onslow	Parliamentary Secretary to the Board of Trade; 1889–1892	Succeeded by Thomas Burt
Preceded by Sir George Trevelyan, Bt	Secretary for Scotland; 1895–1903	Succeeded by Andrew Murray
Court offices
Preceded by The Earl of Ducie	Lord Warden of the Stannaries; 1908–1921	Succeeded by The Lord Clinton
Academic offices
Preceded by The Lord Robertson	Rector of the University of Edinburgh; 1896–1899	Succeeded by The Marquess of Dufferin and Ava
Preceded by The Duke of Argyll	Chancellor of the University of St Andrews; 1900–1921	Succeeded by The Earl Haig
Peerage of Scotland
Preceded by Robert Balfour	Lord Balfour of Burleigh; 1869–1921	Succeeded by George Bruce
