= Kennet, Clackmannanshire =

Coordinates: 56.1°N 3.728°W

Kennet
- Location within Clackmannanshire
- OS grid reference: NS925910
- Council area: Clackmannanshire
- Lieutenancy area: Clackmannanshire
- Country: Scotland
- Sovereign state: United Kingdom
- Post town: CLACKMANNAN
- Postcode district: FK10
- Dialling code: 01259
- Police: Scotland
- Fire: Scottish
- Ambulance: Scottish
- UK Parliament: Alloa and Grangemouth
- Scottish Parliament: Clackmannanshire and Dunblane

Kennet is a small former coal-mining village in Clackmannanshire, Scotland. It is located 1.5 kilometres (0.93 mi) south-east of Clackmannan, by the Kincardine railway line. The village is a conservation area, designated by Clackmannanshire Council.

Kennet House, the seat of the Bruces of Kennet, was located to the west of the village (grid reference NS918908). The house was built or rebuilt in the 1790s for the judge Robert Bruce, Lord Kennet. His descendant, the politician and banker Alexander Bruce, established a claim to the forfeited title of Lord Balfour of Burleigh in 1868. The house was demolished in 1967.

Between 1905 and 1961, coal was mined at the Brucefield Colliery, located just to the north of Kennet (grid reference NS928913). In 1948, 75,000 tons of coal were extracted. A brickworks on the site continued to operate into the 1960s.
