= Alexander Balfour (disambiguation) =

Alexander Balfour (1824–1886) was a Scottish merchant and founder of the shipping company Balfour Williamson.

Alexander Balfour may also refer to:

- Sir Alexander Balfour (1604–1675), one of the Balfour baronets
- Alexander Balfour (novelist) (1767–1829), Scottish novelist
- Alexander Balfour of Burleigh (1849–1921), Scottish politician
