= Baron Balfour of Glenawley =

Title in the Peerage of Ireland

Barony of Balfour of Glenawley
- Argent, on a chevron sable, an otter's head erased of the first, in base a saltire couped of the second
- Creation date: 8 November 1619
- Created by: James VI
- Peerage: Peerage of Ireland
- First holder: Sir James Balfour
- Last holder: James Balfour, 2nd Baron Balfour of Glenawley or Alexander Balfour, 3rd Baron Balfour of Glenawley
- Remainder to: 1st baron's heirs male of the body lawfully begotten
- Status: Extinct
- Extinction date: 1636
- Seat: Castle Balfour

Baron Balfour of Glenawley or Clonawley, in the County of Fermanagh, was a title in the Peerage of Ireland. It was created in 1619 for Sir James Balfour, younger brother of the 1st Lord Balfour of Burleigh. It refers to the barony of Clanawley (sometimes erroneously written as Glenawley).

Balfour was the second son of judge James Balfour, Lord Pittendreich. He and his elder brother were granted lands in Ireland during the Plantation of Ulster. Lord Balfour of Glenawley was the largest of the undertakers in County Fermanagh, where he built Castle Balfour in Lisnaskea.

Lord Balfour died in October 1634. He had two sons who survived him, but neither had heirs, and they died shortly after him. The title became extinct on the death of his younger son in 1636, however, it is possible he never succeeded to the title. According to The Complete Peerage, the succession of a third Baron Balfour of Glenawley has never been recognised in any peerage.

The lordship of Glenawley was revived in 1661 for Hugh Hamilton, 1st Baron of Glenawley, whose wife, Arabella Susan Balfour of Pitcullo, was also a relative, a daughter of a Sir William Balfour, and a nephew of Lord Balfour's daughter Anne.

== Barons Balfour of Glenawley (1619) ==
- James Balfour, 1st Baron Balfour of Glenawley (died 1634)
- James Balfour, 2nd Baron Balfour of Glenawley (died 1635)
- Alexander Balfour, 3rd Baron Balfour of Glenawley (died 1636), possibly never succeeded to the title

== See also ==
- Lord Balfour of Burleigh
- Castle Balfour
