= Aetites =

Folk belief in Europe and the Near East

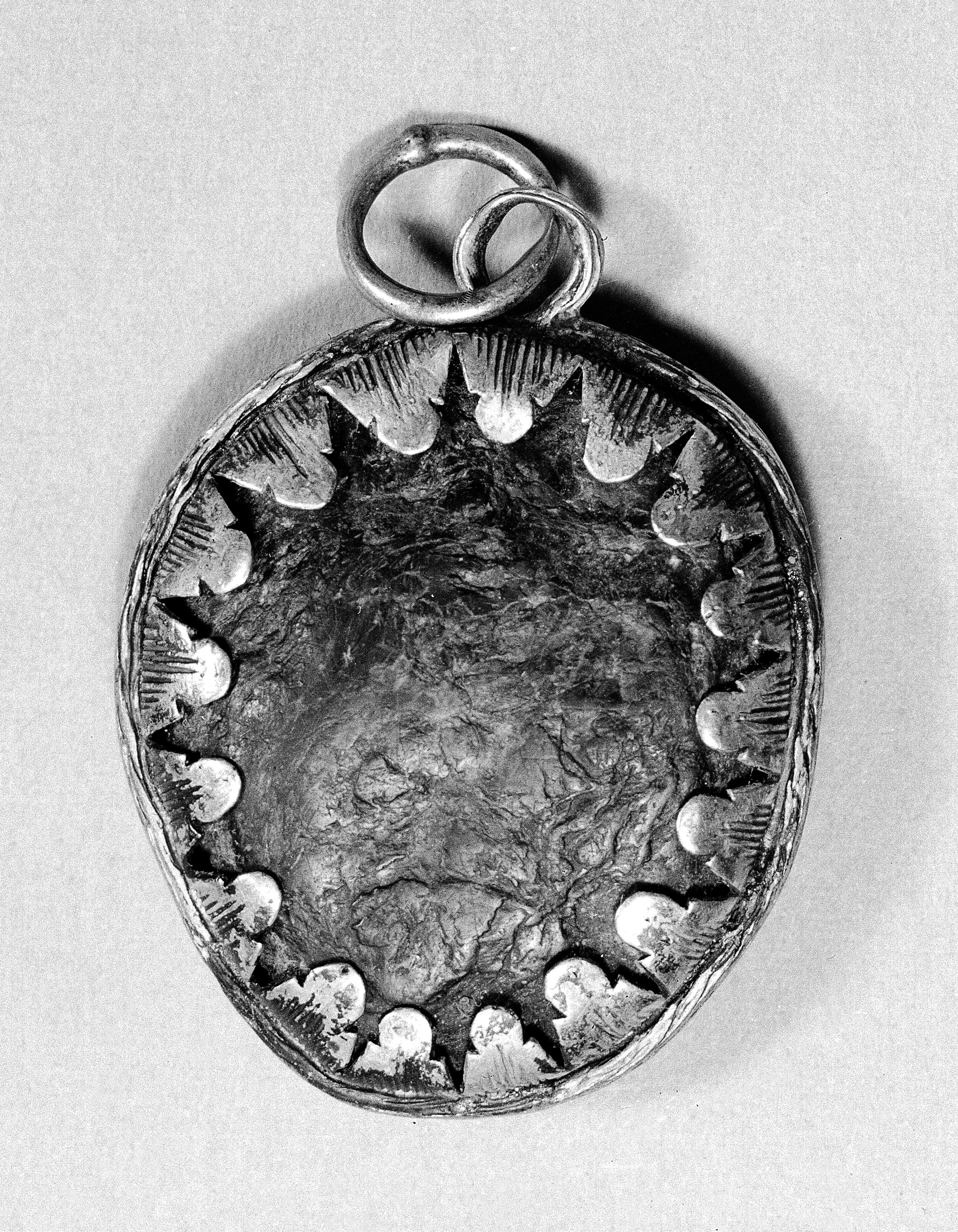
Eagle stone amulet, seventeenth century, from the Bavarian and Austrian amulet collection of W. L. Hildburgh, originally gifted to the Wellcome Museum.

In the magical tradition of Europe and the Near East (see: Magic in the Greco-Roman world), the aetites (singular in Latin) or aetite (anglicized) is a stone used to promote childbirth. It is also called an eagle-stone, aquiline, or aquilaeus. The stone is said to prevent spontaneous abortion and premature delivery, while shortening labor and birth for a full-term birth.

From Theophrastus onwards, the belief is also recorded that the stone had the ability to "give birth" to other stones, based on the crystals found within. This fed into the belief that at least some minerals could be gendered into male and female forms.

== Mineralogy ==
The aetites is a limonite or siderite concretionary nodules or geodes possessing inside a small loose stone rattle when shaken. An official publication of the United States Bureau of Mines in 1920 defined an aetite:

A nodule consisting of a hard shell of hydrated oxide of iron, within which the yellow oxide becomes progressively softer toward the center, which is sometimes quite empty.

The American Geosciences Institute defines the eaglestone as "a concretionary nodule of clay ironstone about the size of a walnut that the ancients believed an eagle takes to her nest to facilitate egg-laying."

== Ancient medicine ==
According to Pedanius Dioscorides (5.160), the aetite should be fastened to the left arm to protect the fetus; at the time of birth, it should be moved to the hip area to ease delivery. He also recommends them for the treatment of epilepsy, and says that when mixed with meat they will "betray a thief".

Pliny the Elder describes four types of aetites in his Natural History and outlines their magico-medical use:

Attached to pregnant women or to cattle, in the skins of animals that have been sacrificed, these stones act as a preventive of abortion, care being taken not to remove them till the moment of parturition; for otherwise procidence of the uterus is the result. If, on the other hand, they are not removed at the moment when parturition is about to ensue, that operation of Nature cannot be effected.

Pliny says that the stone is found in the nests of eagles, who cannot propagate without them.

The fourth-century magico-medical text Cyranides also claims that the aetite worn as an amulet can prevent miscarriage caused by female demons such as Gello.

=== Jewish medical practice ===
Jewish women used birthing stones, and the Talmud refers to the "preserving stone," worn as an amulet even during Shabbat to prevent miscarriage. Although medieval sources point to the eagle-stone, the identification is not certain. Rabbis in medieval France and Germany, and a Polish talmudist in the 16th century, describe the stone as hollow, with a smaller stone inside: "the stone within a stone represented a fetus in the womb." One medieval French source says that the stone "is pierced through the middle, and is round, about as large and heavy as a medium sized egg, glassy in appearance, and is to be found in the fields."

== Medicine to 1700 ==
The aetite, to be carried by pregnant women on their right side, is mentioned by Ruberto Bernardi in his 1364 book of popular medical lore. The Italian Renaissance philosopher Marsilio Ficino ascribes the aetite's ability to ease childbirth to the astrological influences of the planet Venus and the Moon. In 1494, Isabella d'Este, the marchioness of Mantua, expressed her confidence in the power of these stones.

The aetite appears in a Spanish work on natural magic by Hernando Castrillo, first published in 1636. Alvaro Alonso Barba's work on metallurgy (Madrid, 1640) touts the efficacy of the aetites, advising that the stone be tied to the left arm to prevent spontaneous abortion, and to the right arm for the opposite effect. The work was widely reviewed, reprinted and translated.

The 1660 book Occult Physick said the aetite

is white and round like a Tennis-ball, and hath a stone that shaketh within it. Being worn it delivereth women in their extremity, but at any other time it is not to be used by them that are with Child. It is good to be worn for the Stone … Feavers and Plague. It doth also dissolve the knobs of the Kings Evil (i.e., scrofula), being bound to the place grieved.

Aetite, along with hematite, was the subject of a 1665 book by J.L. Bausch, municipal physician (Stadtphysikus) of Schweinfurt and founder of the German National Academy of Sciences Leopoldina. Bausch, however, cautions that empty promises of the stone's powers exceed the limits of both medicine and nature. Thomas Browne affirmed the stone's application to obstetrics in his Pseudodoxia Epidemica (1672), but doubted the story about eagles.

The stones were expensive; in Scotland, Anna Balfour included her stone as a bequest in a will, and English women borrowed and shared these stones to use as amulets in pregnancy.

== Selected bibliography ==
- Harris, Nichola Erin, The idea of lapidary medicine, 2009, Rutgers University, Ph.D. dissertation (book forthcoming), available online as PDF
- Stol, Marten. Birth in Babylonia and the Bible. Styx Publications, 2000. Limited preview online.
- Thorndike, Lynn. A History of Magic and Experimental Science.
