= Balgarvie Castle =

Castle in Fife, Scotland

Coordinates: 56.328337°N 3.047868°W

Balgarvie Castle was located at Balgarvie, near Cupar in Fife, Scotland. The castle was sacked by an English army led by Sir John Pettsworth during the reign of Robert the Bruce (1306–1329). Balgarvie was a possession of the Balfours of Burleigh, and was later sold to the Earl of Melville. It was demolished circa 1938–1940, and there are no remains surviving.
