= Thomas Graham Balfour =

Scottish physician

Surgeon-General Thomas Graham Balfour FRS FRCS
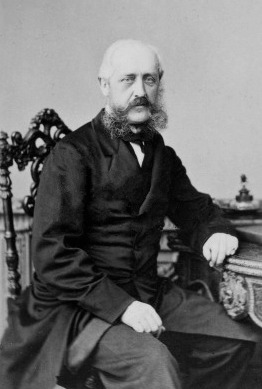
- Balfour in the 1860s
- Born: 18 March 1813
- Died: 17 January 1891 (aged 77)

Thomas Graham Balfour (18 March 1813 – 17 January 1891) was a Scottish physician noted for his work with medical statistics, and a member of Florence Nightingale's inner circle.

== Biography ==
Balfour was born in Edinburgh on 18 March 1813. He was son of John Balfour, a merchant of Leith, and his wife Helen, daughter of Thomas Buchanan of Ardoch. He was the great-grandson of James Balfour, professor of moral philosophy at Edinburgh in 1754, and of Robert Whytt, a celebrated medical writer and professor of physiology at Edinburgh. He graduated MD at Edinburgh in 1834; FRS, 1859; Surgeon-General, Honorary Physician to Queen Victoria and compiler of the first four volumes of Statistics of the British Army. According to Francis de Chaumont, the publication of this statistical work "marked an epoch in hygiene".

The Statistics of the British Army were reputed to be the most accurate and complete of their sort throughout Europe.

From 1840 to 1848, Balfour served as assistant surgeon in the Grenadier Guards. In 1857 he was appointed secretary to Sidney Herbert's committee on the sanitary state of the army, and in 1859 he became deputy inspector-general in charge of the new statistical branch of the army medical department, a post which he held for fourteen years. He was elected a Fellow of the Royal Society on 3 June 1858, and in 1860 a fellow of the Royal College of Physicians of London.

He along with Dr John Sutherland were secretaries to the Sanitary Section of the International Statistical Congress in 1860, which was attended by Adolphe Quetelet, and to which Florence Nightingale submitted a paper.

In 1887 he was appointed honorary physician to the queen. He was placed on half-pay as surgeon-general in 1876, and in his forty years of service had done much to improve the sanitary condition of the forces. He was President of the Royal Statistical Society from 1888 to 1890 shortly after it had changed from the Statistical Society of London. He married in 1856 Georgina, daughter of George Prentice of Armagh, and had one son, Sir Graham Balfour. He died at Coombe Lodge, Wimbledon, on 17 January 1891.
