= Michael Balfour (historian) =

English historian and civil servant

Michael Leonard Graham Balfour CBE (22 November 1908 – 16 September 1995) was an English historian and civil servant.

He was born in Oxford, the son of Sir Graham Balfour. He was educated at Rugby School and Balliol College, Oxford, where he graduated with a first in history.

He first visited Germany in 1930, where he became a friend of Helmuth James von Moltke, later executed as an opponent by the Nazis. During the Second World War, Balfour worked at the Ministry of Information and the Political Intelligence Department of the Foreign Office (the cover name for the Political Warfare Executive). In 1944, he joined the Psychological Warfare Division of the Supreme Headquarters Allied Expeditionary Force. After the war, he became director of Public Relations and Information Services, Control Commission, in the British Zone of Allied-occupied Germany.

He was chief information officer at the Board of Trade from 1947 to 1964, and professor of European History at the University of East Anglia from 1966 to 1974.

In 1934 he married Grizel Wilson (younger sister of the diplomat Duncan Wilson, a friend of his at Balliol, and of philosopher Mary Warnock). They had three daughters.

Balfour died in the Oxfordshire town of Witney at age 86.

== Works ==
- States and Mind: Reflections on Their Interaction in History (1953)
- Four-Power Control in Germany and Austria 1945-46 (1956)
- The Kaiser and His Times (1964)
- West Germany: A Contemporary History (1968)
- Helmuth von Moltke. A Leader against Hitler (1972) (co-author Julian Frisby)
- Propaganda in War 1939-45: Organizations, Policies and Publics in Britain and Germany (1979)
- The Adversaries: America, Russia and the Open World, 1941 – 1962 (1981)
- Britain and Joseph Chamberlain (1985)
- Withstanding Hitler in Germany 1933-45 (1988)
