= Jack Kappler =

Australian rules footballer

Personal information
- Full name: Emanuel Selway Kappler
- Nickname: Jack
- Born: 5 November 1892; Adelaide, South Australia
- Died: 23 November 1969 (aged 77); Park Holme, South Australia
- Position: Defender

Playing career^{1}
Years	Club	Games (Goals)
1913–1915, 1919–1920	Sturt	47 (0)
1921–1922	Glenelg	23 (0)

Representative team honours
Years	Team	Games (Goals)
	South Australia	1
- ^{1} Playing statistics correct to the end of 1922.

Career highlights
- 2x Sturt premiership 1915, 1919; Inaugural Sturt Best and Fairest 1913

Jack Kappler (5 November 1892 – 23 November 1969) was an Australian rules footballer who played with Sturt and Glenelg in the South Australian National Football League (SANFL). Kappler was the first winner of Sturt's Best and Fairest, and was a member of Glenelg's inaugural team.
