= George Bruce, 7th Lord Balfour of Burleigh =

Lord Balfour of Burleigh

George John Gordon Bruce, 7th Lord Balfour of Burleigh (18 October 1883 – 4 June 1967) was a Scottish peer and banker. He was a Scottish representative peer in the British House of Lords from 1923 to 1963, and was Chairman of Lloyds Bank from 1946 to 1954.

Peerage of Scotland
Preceded by Alexander Bruce	Lord Balfour of Burleigh; 1921–1967	Succeeded by Robert Bruce
