= James Balfour, Lord Pittendreich =

Scottish legal writer, judge and politician (died 1583)

James Balfour, Lord Pittendreich (c. 1525–1583) was a Scottish legal writer, judge and politician.

== Life ==
The son of Andrew Balfour of Montquhanny, he was educated for the legal branch of the Catholic Church in Scotland.

Balfour was involved in the murder of Cardinal Beaton and the Siege of St Andrews Castle. In June 1547, following the capture of the castle by French forces, he was condemned to be a galley-slave rowing galleys, together with John Knox and others captured at St Andrews, Fife. He was released in 1549, denounced Protestantism, entered the service of Mary of Guise, and was rewarded with important legal appointments.

He subsequently joined the Lords of the Congregation, a group of Protestant nobles who opposed the marriage of the young Mary, Queen of Scots, to the Dauphin of France (later to become King Francois II of France), but betrayed their plans.

After Mary's arrival in Scotland, he became one of her secretaries, in 1565 being reported as her greatest favourite after David Rizzio. He obtained the parsonage of Flisk in Fife in 1561, was nominated an Extraordinary Lord of Session, and in 1563 one of the commissaries of the court which now took the place of the former ecclesiastical tribunal. In 1565, he was made a privy counsellor and, in 1566, Lord Clerk Register, and was knighted.

According to Mary, his murder was planned together with Rizzio's in 1566. An adherent of Bothwell, he was deeply implicated in the murder of Lord Darnley, though not present at the commission of the crime. By his means, Darnley was lodged at Kirk o' Field, his brothers' house. He was supposed to have drawn up and signed the bond at Craigmillar Castle for the murder. At the time of Mary's wedding to Bothwell, he was made keeper of Edinburgh Castle in place of the recently appointed James Cockburn of Skirling. Balfour is said to have drawn up the marriage-contract between Bothwell and Mary. When, however, the fall of Bothwell was seen to be impending, he rapidly changed sides, and in September 1567 surrendered the castle to James, 1st Earl of Moray, stipulating, for his pardon for Darnley's murder, the retention of the priory of Pittenweem, and pecuniary rewards. Lord Moray obtained the Queen's jewels and clothing from Edinburgh Castle, which he intended to sell or pledge for loans.

Balfour was appointed Lord President of the Court of Session on resigning the office of Lord Clerk Register. He was present at the Battle of Langside, and was accused of having advised Mary to leave Dunbar Castle to her ruin, and of having betrayed to her enemies the Casket Letters. The same year, however, in consequence of renewed intrigues with Mary's faction, he was dismissed, and next year was imprisoned on the charge of complicity in Darnley's murder.

He escaped by means of bribery, which he is said to have paid by intercepting money sent from France for Mary's aid. In August 1571, during the regency of the 4th Earl of Lennox, an act of forfeiture was passed against him, but next year he was again playing traitor and revealed the secrets of his party to James, Earl of Morton. He obtained a pardon from Lord Morton in 1573, and negotiated the pacification of Perth the same year. Distrusted by all parties, he fled to France, where he seems to have remained until 1580. In 1579, his forfeiture was renewed by an Act of the Scottish Parliament. In January 1580, he wrote to Mary, offering her his services, and in June made a similar offer to Queen Elizabeth I of England, in which he criticised the influence of the Jesuits, and proposed to make a journey to Dieppe to attend Protestant services.

On 27 December the same year, he returned to Scotland and effected the downfall and execution of Lord Morton by producing a bond, probably that in defence of Bothwell and to promote his marriage with Mary, and giving evidence of the latter's knowledge of Bothwell's intention to murder Darnley. In July 1581, his cause was reheard; he was acquitted of murder by assize, and shortly afterwards, in 1581 or 1582, he was restored to his estates and received at Court. His career ended shortly before 24 January 1584. He was the greatest lawyer of his day, and part-author at least of Balfour's Practicks, the earliest textbook of Scots law, not published, however, until 1754.

He wrote a major work on Scots law, called Practicks. This was completed about 1579 and was widely circulated in manuscript copies. It was published in 1754, and republished in 1962: Peter G B McNeil (ed), The Practicks of Sir James Balfour of Pittendreich (1962, Stair Society).

He married Margaret, daughter and heir of Michael Balfour of Burleigh, by whom, besides three daughters, he had six sons, the eldest of whom, Sir Michael Balfour, was created Lord Balfour of Burleigh in 1607. His second son, Sir James Balfour, was created Baron Balfour of Glenawley in 1619.
