= James Balfour (planter) =

Scottish-born physician and planter (1777–1841)

- Born: 1777; Dalgety, Fife, Scotland
- Died: 13 July 1841 (aged 63–64); Waterloo, Nickerie, Surinam
- Occupations: Planter, physician
- Children: Harriët Balfour

James Balfour (1777 – 13 July 1841) was a Scottish-born medical doctor and planter. He worked as a doctor in Berbice and later became a plantation owner in Nickerie District. Harriët Balfour was his daughter with a slave. He requested Harriët's freedom the day before he died.

== Biography ==
Balfour was born in 1777 in Dalgety, Fife, Scotland. He became a medical doctor in Berbice which nowadays in Guyana. As a physician, he used electric eels to cure rheumatism. In 1816, he threw a plank into the Mission Chapel, New Amsterdam where slaves were being taught, and was sentenced for interruption of Divine service. In 1818, he fathered his daughter Premiere with a slave. His daughter was later named Harriët.

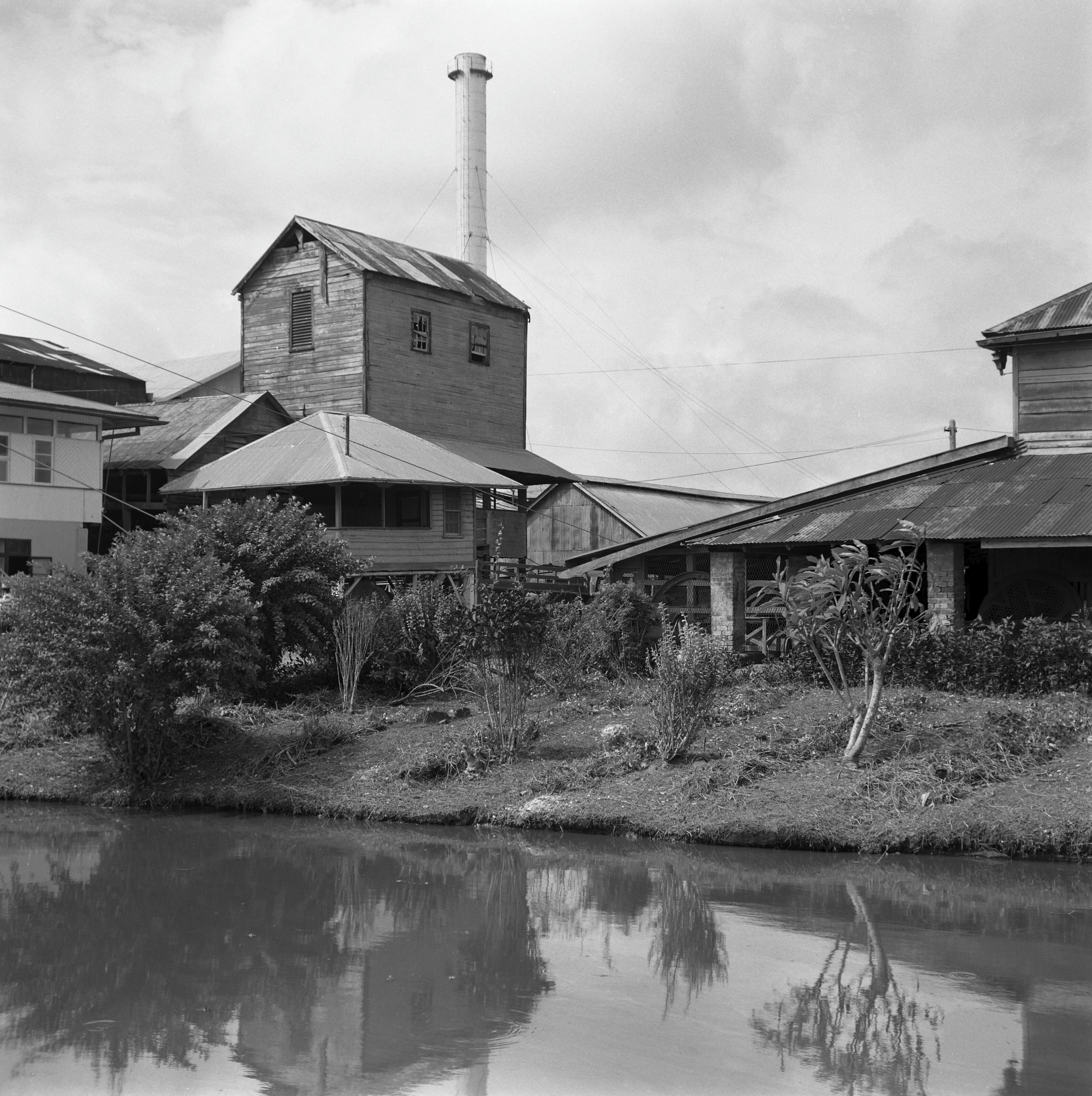
Sugar factory at Waterloo

In 1819, Balfour started the sugar plantation Waterloo in Nickerie, Suriname. The plantation became of one the biggest of the district, and a modern sugar factory was constructed on the grounds. In 1821, he bought the wood plantation Berlijn, and wanted to transport the slaves to Waterloo. In Paramaribo, the slaves discovered their final destination, revolted, and escaped back to Berlijn. The government ruled that they could remain in Berlijn. Between 1820 and 1842, Waterloo had the most escape attempts (31) of the District, and most complaints about maltreatment.

August Kappler was German soldier who had enlisted in the Royal Netherlands Army. Later, he would become known as an author, naturalist, and founder of Albina. During 1838, Kappler often visited Balfour, and noted that he was "an eccentric man of tremendous wealth, yet always wanting more." Kappler also noted that he had never been married, and lived alone with his slave daughter who ran the household. In November 1838, Kappler was sent on his first patrol to retrieve two escaped slaves from Waterloo. The slaves had managed to reach British Guiana where a plantation owner graciously invited them to stay, only to return them to Nickerie.

On 12 July 1841, Balfour put in a request to free his daughter from slavery. He died the next day. Robert Kirke, his nephew, inherited his estate. When Balfour died, his capital was valued at ƒ 312,000 (about €7.2 million in 2018). He owned 845 slaves, and four plantations valued at ƒ 646,226 (about €14.9 million in 2018). Harriët Balfour was freed on 4 August 1841, at the age of 23.

After Balfour's death, his body was embalmed and placed into a large stone tomb. The slaves had to walk past his grave on their way to work. Once a year, the grave was opened and cleaned until Amin Sankar, the owner of Waterloo since 1936, ended the ceremony. As of 2020, the sugar factory and tomb are hidden in the jungle.
