= Master (Peerage of Scotland) =

Scottish nobility title

The heir apparent or heir presumptive to a Scottish peerage is known as a Master or a Mistress. The heir's style is "The Master of [Peerage]" or "The Mistress of [Peerage]".

If the master is an heir apparent, and the peerage has a subsidiary title that could be used as a courtesy title, then the styling of Master is usually forgone. However, if the person is an heir presumptive, or if the peerage has no subsidiary title, then Master/Mistress is a common styling. However, because the word Mistress is quite archaic, many women choose not to use the style Mistress and instead use the regular styling, e.g. Lady Mary Smith or The Honourable Mary Smith.

Although regarded today as a form of courtesy title, the Mastership is a noble dignity in its own right, and originally conferred rights of attendance in the Parliament of Scotland. As a result, Masters were ineligible for election to the British House of Commons for Scottish constituencies after the Acts of Union 1707. Masters whose elections were declared void on this basis included four elected in the 1708 British general election, who each briefly attended parliament. Members of Parliament would be disqualified upon becoming the eldest (living) son of a Scottish peer, and a by-election would be held for the vacant seat. Therefore, they were denied the right to sit in both houses of the British Parliament. This practice was ended by the Scottish Reform Act 1832, and the Masters could be elected MPs like their English counterparts thereafter.

== Members of British Parliament disqualified for being a Master ==
MP disqualified	Constituency	Father	Year of election	Year of disqualification	Notes
William, Lord Haddo	Aberdeenshire	George Gordon, 1st Earl of Aberdeen	1708	1708	
James, Lord Johnstone	Dumfriesshire & Linlithgowshire	William Johnstone, 1st Marquess of Annandale	1708	1708	Returned by two constituencies; disqualified for both
John, Master of Sinclair	Dysart Burghs	Henry St Clair, 10th Lord Sinclair	1708	1708	
William, Lord Strathnaver	Tain Burghs	John Gordon, 16th Earl of Sutherland	1708	1708	
Charles, Earl of Drumlanrig	Dumfriesshire	Charles Douglas, 3rd Duke of Queensberry	1747	1754	Disqualified upon becoming the eldest living son of his father
John, Marquess of Lorne	Glasgow Burghs	John Campbell, 4th Duke of Argyll	1744 (by election)	1761	Disqualified when his father succeeded to the peerage; later returned as MP for Dover
Francis, Lord Elcho	Haddington Burghs	Francis Wemyss Charteris, soi disant 7th Earl of Wemyss	1780	1787	Disqualified when his father assumed the peerage; later it was found out that the title was under forfeiture and his father not a Scottish peer at all

== People who currently hold the dignity of Master or Mistress ==
- Lord Alistair Hay, Master of Tweeddale, heir presumptive to the Marquessate of Tweeddale
- Susan of Mar, Mistress of Mar, heir presumptive to the Earldom of Mar
- Alexander David Erskine, Master of Mar and Kellie, heir presumptive to the Earldom of Mar and Kellie
- Geoffrey Charles Murray, Master of Dunmore, heir presumptive to the Earldom of Dunmore
- Alexander Cary, Master of Falkland, heir apparent to the Viscountcy of Falkland
- Christopher Keith Arbuthnott, Master of Arbuthnott, heir apparent to the Viscountcy of Arbuthnott
- Neil Malcolm Ross Forbes, Master of Forbes, heir apparent to the Lordship of Forbes
- Alexander Fraser, Master of Saltoun, heir apparent to the Lordship of Saltoun
- Jack Fraser, Master of Lovat, heir presumptive to the Lordship of Lovat
- Francis Sempill, Master of Sempill, heir apparent to the Lordship of Sempill
- Jago Alexander Elphinstone, Master of Elphinstone, heir presumptive to the Lordship of Elphinstone
- Laetitia Bruce-Winkler, Mistress of Burleigh, heir presumptive to the Lordship of Balfour of Burleigh
- Lewis Edward Palmer, Master of Dingwall, heir apparent to the Lordship of Dingwall (also Great Britain Baron Lucas of Crudwell)
- William Alexander Hugh Napier, Master of Napier, heir apparent to the Lordship of Napier
- Alexander Shimi Markus Mackay, Master of Reay, heir apparent to the Lordship of Reay
- Frederick Carmichael Arthur Hamilton, Master of Belhaven, heir apparent to the Lordship of Belhaven and Stenton
- James David William Rollo, Master of Rollo, heir apparent to the Lordship of Rollo
- William Henry Hepburne-Scott, Master of Polwarth, heir apparent to the Lordship of Polwarth
