= Robert Balfour, 5th Lord Balfour of Burleigh =

Robert Balfour, 5th Lord Balfour of Burleigh (buried 20 March 1757) was a Jacobite from the Burleigh family of the county of Kinross, remembered chiefly for a murder of a man who had married a woman he felt attracted to.

== Biography ==
=== Murder of Henry Stenhouse ===
Balfour, when a youth fell in love with a woman far inferior in rank, much to the annoyance of his family. He was sent to travel abroad in the hope that he would forget his attachment. Before he set out he declared to his lady-love that if in his absence she married he would kill her husband. Notwithstanding the threat, she did marry a Henry Stenhouse, schoolmaster at Inverkeithing, acquainting him beforehand of the hazard.

On Balfour's return his first inquiry was after the woman. On being informed of her marriage, on 9 April 1707 he proceeded on horseback with two attendants directly to the school at Inverkeithing, called Stenhouse out, deliberately shot him, wounding him in the shoulder, and quietly returned to Burleigh. The schoolmaster lingered twelve days, and then died. Balfour was tried for the murder in the High Court of Justiciary on 4 August 1709. The defence was ingenious, but inadequate; Balfour argued there had been no intent to kill, that the wound was merely to the arm and hence plainly designed to frighten or correct, and that the deceased had lived for several days after the being shot before dying of a 'fretful temper'. Balfour was found guilty, and sentenced to be beheaded on 6 January 1709–10. But a few days prior to this he escaped from the Edinburgh Tolbooth by exchanging clothes with his sister, who resembled him. He skulked for some time in the neighbourhood of Burleigh, and is reputed to have concealed himself in a hollowed ash-tree afterwards named "Burleigh's Hole".

On the death of his father, in 1713, the title devolved on him. His next appearance was at the meeting of Jacobites at Lochmaben, 29 May 1714, when the Pretender's health was drunk, Lord Burleigh denouncing damnation against all who would not drink it. He engaged in the rebellion of 1715. For this he was in the same year attainted by an act of Parliament, and his estates, worth £697 per annum, were forfeited to the Crown.

Balfour's story is retold by writer Daniel Defoe in his 1724 Tour thro' the Whole Island of Great Britain as part of the description of the town of Inverkeithing. Defoe asserts that the tragical story had been much talked about in England at the time.

=== Death ===
Balfour died, without issue, in 1757 and was buried at Greyfriars Kirkyard, Edinburgh. The attainder was reversed by Bruce's Restitution Act 1869 (32 & 33 Vict. c. 11 Pr.) in favour of Alexander Bruce, 6th Lord Balfour of Burleigh.

Peerage of Scotland
Preceded by Robert Balfour	Lord Balfour of Burleigh; 1713–1715	Forfeit restored to Alexander Bruce in 1869
