= Robert Balfour, 4th of Balbirnie =

Robert Balfour of Balbirnie (1698–1766), from Fife, Scotland, was Member of Parliament for Midlothian (also known as Edinburghshire) from 1751 to 1754.

After his marriage to Ann Ramsay in 1736, he was styled Robert Balfour-Ramsay. Robert was a son of George Balfour of Balbirnie and Agnes Lumsdaine.

His wife Ann was the daughter of Sir Andrew Ramsay, 4th Baronet, of Whitehill. Their surviving children were:

- John Balfour, 5th of Balbirnie (1739–1813); married Mary Gordon
- George Balfour, later Ramsay (1740–1806), of Whitehill
- Andrew Balfour, later Ramsay (1741–1814), of Whitehill
- Robert Balfour (1742–1807) of Balcurvie
- General James Balfour (1743–1823), of Whitehill
- Elizabeth Balfour; married Captain William Wardlaw
- William Balfour (1755–1793) of the Honourable East India Company
- Ann Balfour (ca. 1757–1826)

Parliament of Great Britain
Preceded by Sir Charles Gilmour, Bt	Member of Parliament for Midlothian; 1751–1754	Succeeded by Robert Dundas
