= James Balfour (British Army officer) =

General James Balfour (3 November 1743 – 18 March 1823) was a British Army General.

He was the son of Robert Balfour of Balbirnie and Ann Ramsay.

Balfour entered the British Army on 22 March 1762. He was commanding the forces at Bombay in 1794. He became colonel of the 83rd Regiment on 18 November 1795 and took part in the Siege of Seringapatam. On 25 October 1809 received the rank of general.

On 20 March 1823, following the death of James Balfour, John Hodgson succeeded to the colonelcy of the 83rd Regiment.
