= James Balfour (priest) =

James Balfour (1731–1809) was a Scottish priest in the Church of England who was an early missionary to Newfoundland. He was sent by the Bishop of London in 1764 to be a missionary in Trinity Bay, Newfoundland, where he discovered a rowdy community sometimes reluctant to receive his ministry—he frequently complained in letters of the "barbarous lawless place," where music and dancing were engaged in on Sunday, fights (particularly between English and Irish) and break-ins were commonplace, and where common-law marriage was a frequent practice. In March 1769 he was even assaulted, seemingly at random. Nevertheless, Balfour eventually managed to make considerable headway in increasing the size of his congregation and in raising money to repair the local church.

In October 1775 he finally persuaded the superiors at the Society for the Propagation of the Gospel to transfer him to Harbour Grace. He was not much better received there, as the town was largely Catholic and Presbyterian and Quaker, and the congregation also wished for a younger minister. William Lampen, the schoolmaster, wrote to the SPG, complaining that the minister was drinking heavily and rarely conducted services. Both Lampen and Balfour were dismissed, and Balfour lived on his salary as a pension until his death.
