= Burleigh Castle =

Tower house in Perth and Kinross, Scotland

Coordinates: 56.2259°N 3.4065°W

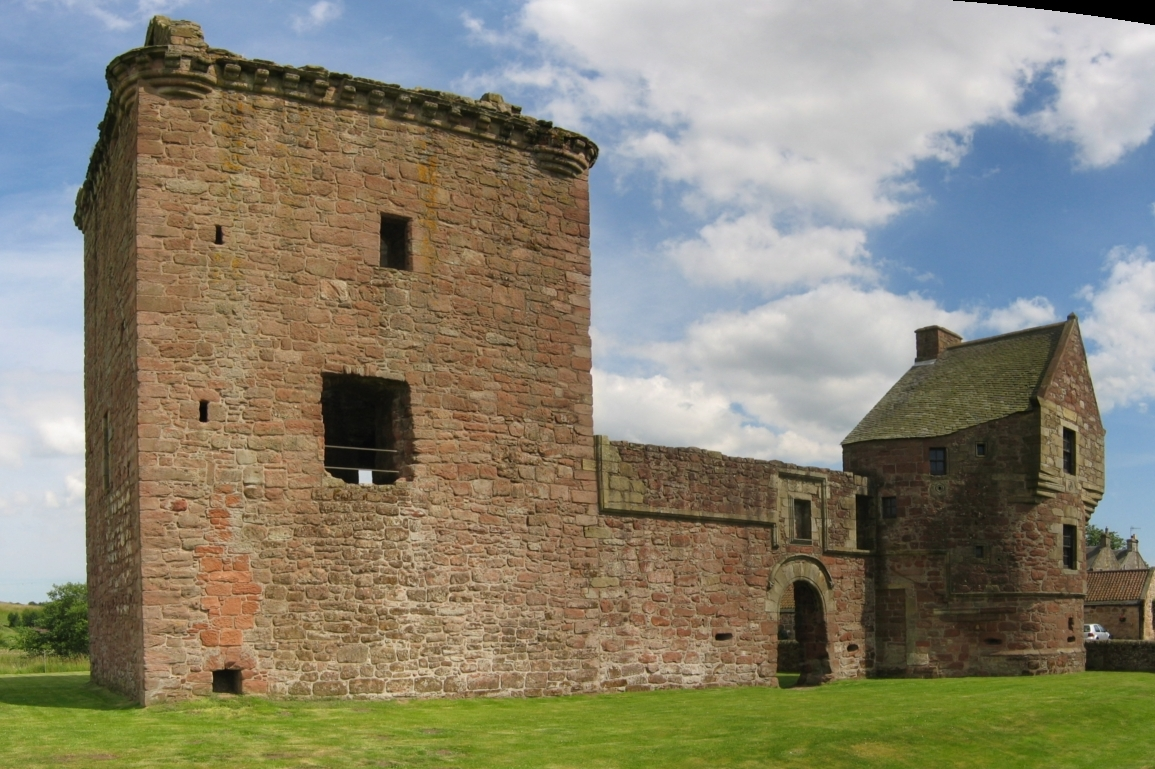
West facade of Burleigh Castle ruins. The original tower house is on the left.

The remains of Burleigh Castle are located just outside the village of Milnathort, 1.5 miles north of Kinross, in Perth and Kinross, Scotland. The castle dates from the 15th and 16th centuries, and now sits beside the A911 road, opposite a 19th-century steading, recently adapted into housing.

== History ==
The lands of Burleigh were held by the Balfours from 1456, when they were granted by James II to John Balfour of Balgarvie, and a tower house was erected in the late 15th or early 16th century. Sir James Balfour of Pittendreich extended the castle in the late 16th century, adding a curtain wall with a corner tower, and other outbuildings.

The castle was a convenient stopping place, Mary of Guise came to dinner at Burleigh on 9 January 1540 and went on to Falkland Palace. James VI of Scotland was a frequent visitor in the time of his son, Sir Michael Balfour. James VI visited Lady Burleigh for a few days in April 1587, and came to Burleigh in January 1589 after spending Christmas at Kinneil House. In July 1596 he stayed at Burleigh then rode to Stirling Castle for the christening of a son of the Countess of Mar.

Colonel William Stewart was imprisoned at Burleigh Castle in June 1592. He was suspected of planning to help the Earl of Bothwell capture James VI at Falkland Palace.

An Act of Parliament in 1600 made Michael Balfour wealthy, directing landowners and people of standing to buy armour from him, for defence musters. Several men complained that Balfour tried to make them buy more armour than their rank and income demanded. In 1607 Michael Balfour was raised to the peerage as Lord Balfour of Burleigh.

Legend tells how Robert Balfour, before his accession as 5th Lord, narrowly escaped death when, in 1707, he was sentenced to beheading for the murder of the schoolmaster of Inverkeithing, who had the misfortune to have married Balfour's childhood sweetheart. Escaping from Edinburgh tolbooth, Balfour joined the Jacobite cause, proclaiming the 'Old Pretender' James Stuart king at Lochmaben, and fighting in the 1715 rising. Following the defeat of the Jacobites, Balfour was attainted, dying in France in 1757.

The castle was forfeit to the Irwins, then passed to the Grahams of Kinross. It is now a Scheduled Ancient Monument in the care of Historic Environment Scotland (no entrance charge; key available from nearby house at all reasonable times).

In more recent history local poet Michael Bruce was inspired by Burleigh Castle and Arnot Tower and wrote a poem "The Lovers" (1760) it tells the story of Henry and Harriet from the feuding families the Arnots and Balfours who reputedly eloped to Burleigh castle.

== The castle ==
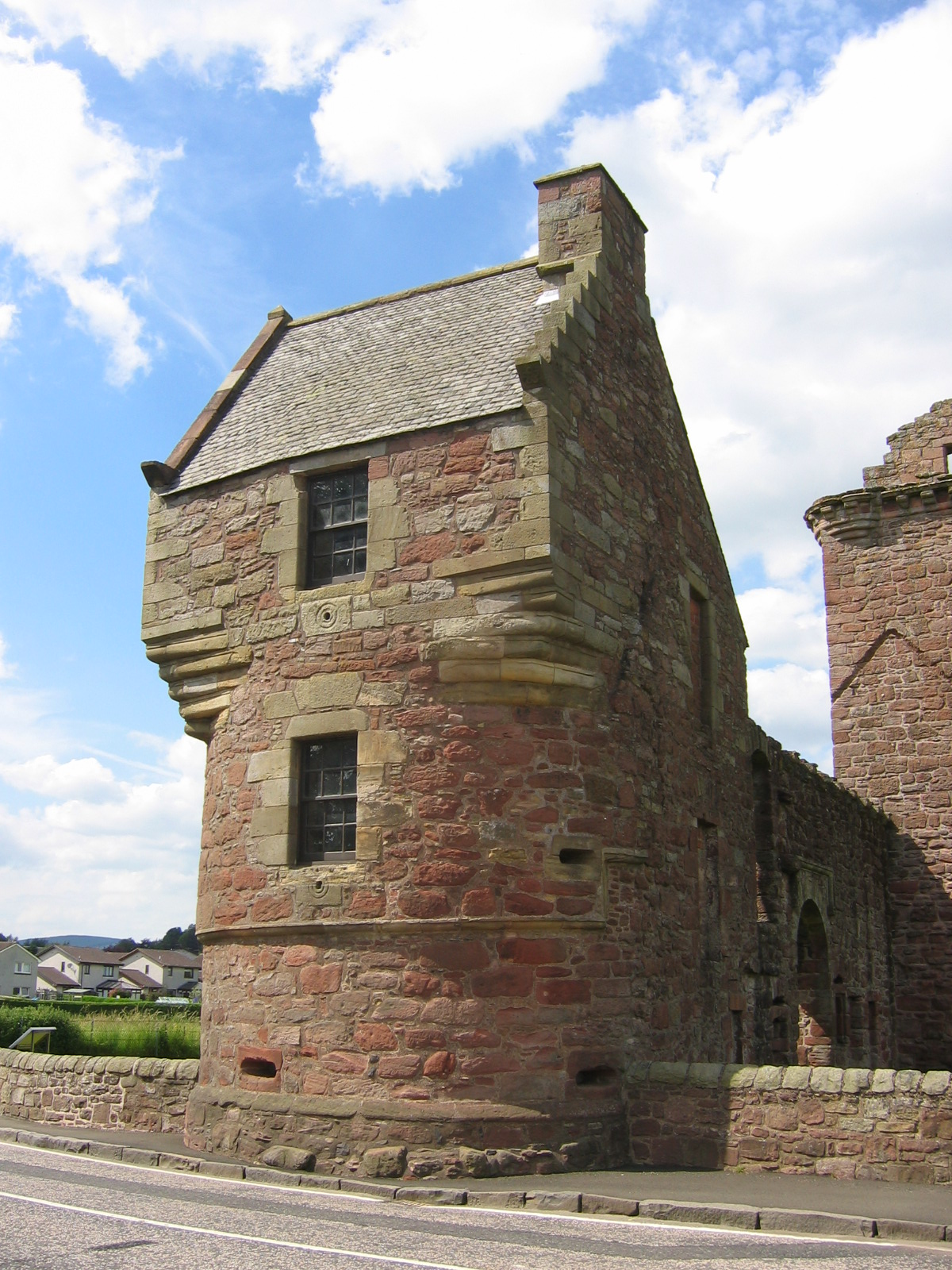
South-west tower of Burleigh Castle

The remains of the castle comprise the western part of what was once a square courtyard or barmkin. In the north-west corner, the original tower house survives largely intact (though one of the first floor windows has been greatly enlarged) to three storeys and a garret in height. The 5-foot-thick (1.5 m) walls rise to corbels which once supported a parapet walk. The roof and internal floors are now gone, although the vaulted basement remains. The turnpike stair in the north-east corner originally led up to a cap-house giving access to the parapet walk.

To the south-west is a 16th-century corner tower, two storeys high above a basement, which retains its roof. The tower is round at the base, and corbelled out to a square upper storey, and is a particularly fine and picturesque example of Scottish baronial architecture of the period. Its masonry is happily very well preserved. Both this tower and the keep have gun loops around the base to deter attackers. The corner tower also has small round pistol-holes at cap-house level, though these may have been included more for their decorative effect than to provide a true defensive capability. Engraved on the north gable is the date 1582, and the initials IB and MB, for Sir James Balfour and his wife Margaret. The two towers are connected by a section of curtain wall pierced by an arched gate. Though now only a 'skin' of masonry, this wall once fronted a two-storey gatehouse. With its string-course, hood-mould over the gateway and moulded surround formerly containing a heraldic panel, this wall is an excellent example of small-scale but refined architectural sophistication of its period in Scotland (probably contemporary with the round corner tower). A defensive moat may have surrounded the barmkin in the past.
