= David Paton Balfour =

New Zealand sheep farmer, station manager, roading supervisor and diarist

David Paton Balfour (12 July 1841 – 13 July 1894) was a New Zealand sheepfarmer, station manager, roading supervisor and diarist. He was born in Monikie, Forfarshire, Scotland on 12 July 1841.
