= Graham Balfour =

British educationist (1858–1929)

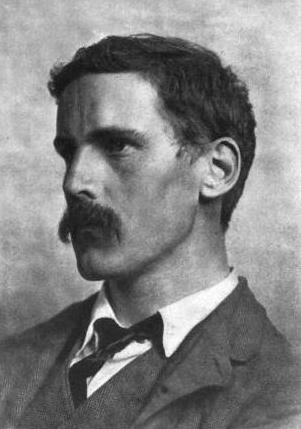
- Born: 2 December 1858; Chelsea, London, England
- Died: 26 October 1929 (aged 70)
- Occupation: educational theorist

Sir Graham Balfour (2 December 1858 – 26 October 1929) was a noted educationalist, author and son of Surgeon General Thomas Graham Balfour. He lived near his cousin, Robert Louis Stevenson during the final years of Stevenson's life, and went on to write a biography of him. After writing a few books, he spent time on education administration, including managing the education system of Staffordshire.

== Biography ==
Balfour was born in Chelsea, London on 2 December 1858 and christened as Thomas Graham Balfour, only son of his parents. His father, also Thomas Graham Balfour, was a Surgeon-General (United Kingdom) and his mother was Georgina Prentice of Armagh. Despite suffering ill health, Balfour attended Marlborough College and later, Worcester College, Oxford and in 1880 gained a degrees in Classical Moderations and in 1882 literae humaniores. He was also won awards for his rifle shooting.

He became an Inner Temple barrister in 1885. From May 1885 he resided with and tutored Frank Russell, 2nd Earl Russell, after Russell's sending down from Oxford, accompanying him on a six-month tour of the US between Oct 1885 and May 1886. By 1891, after his parents had died, he moved to Vailima, Samoa, to live near his cousin Robert Louis Stevenson. Stevenson died in 1894, so Balfour returned to England. He married Rhoda Brooke, daughter of Leonard Dobbin Brooke of Birkenhead in 1896 and the couple had two sons, one of whom was Michael Balfour.

During the early 1900s, he was general director of education for Staffordshire while the entire education system was being remodelled at central government. The system he put in place was used as an example for to the rest of the country. He was knighted in 1917, and served in a few government posts encouraging education. Balfour died on 26 October 1929.

== Publications ==
Balfour contributed a chapter in Charles Booth's Life and Labour of the People in London regarding life in Battersea 1891–1903. His 1898 publication Educational Systems of Great Britain and Ireland became a "standard work in its field".

=== Bibliography ===
- Balfour, Graham (1889). "Battersea". In Booth, Charles (ed.). Life and Labour of the People in London (1891–1903).
- Balfour, Graham (1898). His Educational Systems of Great Britain and Ireland. Oxford: Claringdon Press.
- Balfour, Graham (1901). The Life of Robert Louis Stevenson.
- Balfour, Graham (1913). Ten Years of Staffordshire Education, 1903–1913.

== Legacy ==
Sir Graham Balfour School, Stafford and Sir Graham Balfour School, Cambodia are named after Balfour.
