= August Kappler =

German botanist

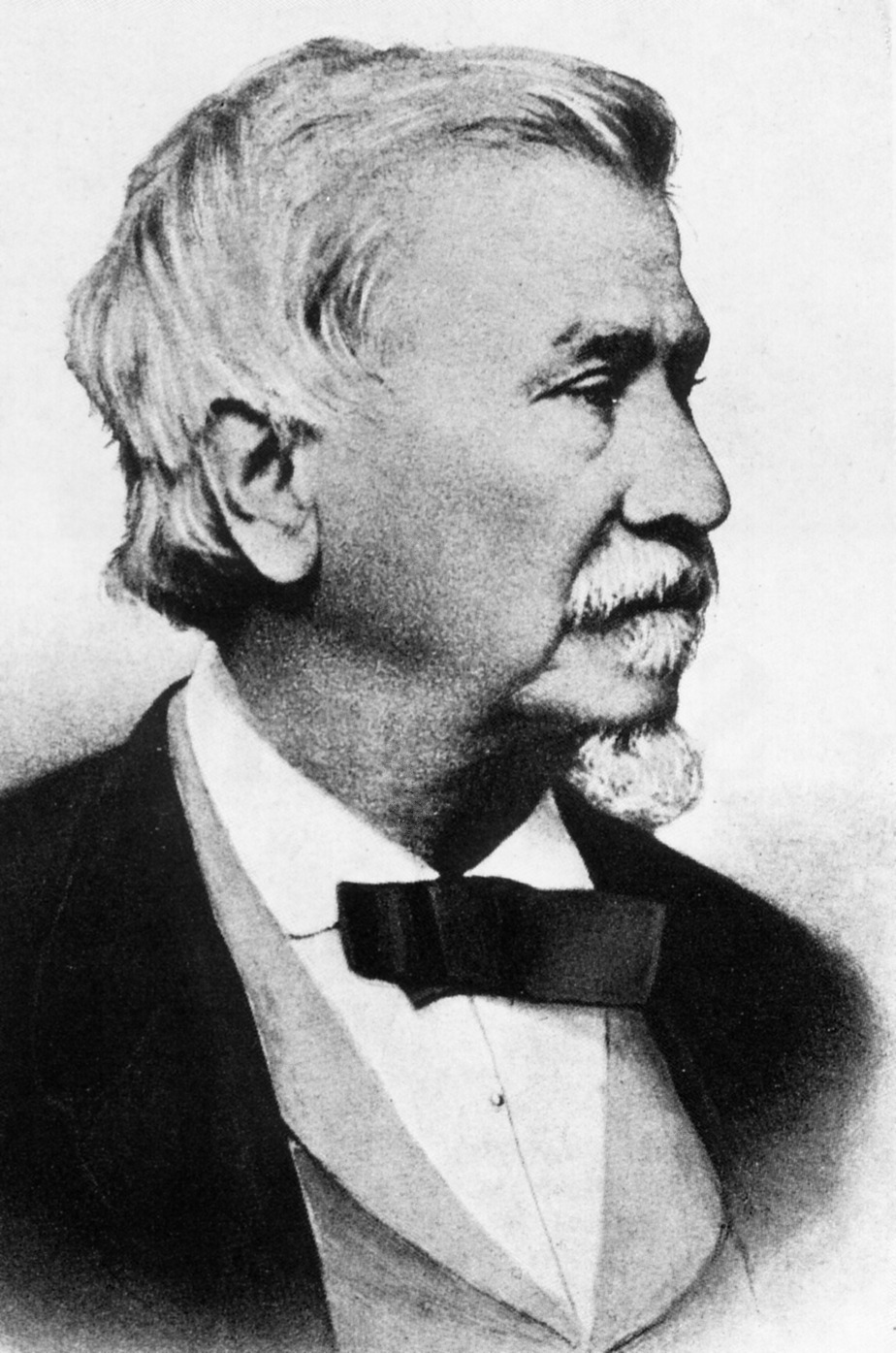
August Kappler

August Kappler (11 November 1815 – 20 October 1887) was a German researcher, naturalist and explorer who was a native of Mannheim. He is credited as the founder of Albina, Suriname.

From January 1836, Kappler was stationed in Suriname as a soldier and member of the Dutch colonial service. Here he had the opportunity to explore the country, and in the process, amass a large collection of insects and plants. In 1854 he published a book involving his experiences in the Dutch colony during time spent as a member of the colonial service.

After his military duties were finished, he spent the years 1842 to 1846 based in Paramaribo, from where he sold butterflies that were collected locally. In latter part of 1846, he had earned enough money to purchase a plot of land near the Marowijne River. Here he would spend the next 33 years of his life, working as a trader, farmer, postal official, among other occupations. He called his homestead "Albina", after his fiancé Albina Josefine Liezenmaier. Within the decade, Albina would become a small settlement with a handful of European settlers.

In 1879 Kappler left Suriname and returned to Germany, subsequently publishing two more books on his experiences in the Dutch colony. He died in Stuttgart at the age of 71, and at his funeral, his coffin was covered with the flag of the Netherlands.

== Selected publications ==
- Sechs Jahre in Surinam oder Bilder aus dem militärischen Leben dieser Kolonie und Skizzen zur Kenntnis seiner sozialen und naturwissenschaftlichen Verhältnisse, (Six years in Suriname or images from the military life of this colony and sketches to its social and scientific conditions); Stuttgart 1854.
- Holländisch-Guiana; Erlebnisse und Erfahrungen während eines 34 jährigen Aufenthalts in der Kolonie Surinam, (Dutch Guiana; Experiences during a 34-year stay in the colony of Surinam); Stuttgart 1881.
- Surinam, sein Land, seine Natur, Bevölkerung und seine Kultur-Verhältnisse mit Bezug auf Kolonisation, (Suriname, The country, its nature, population and cultural conditions with respect to colonization); Stuttgart 1887.
