= Michael Balfour, 1st Lord Balfour of Burleigh =

Scottish peer

Michael Balfour, 1st Lord Balfour of Burleigh PC (died 15 March 1619), was a Scottish peer.

Balfour was the eldest son of Lord Pittendreich, President of the Court of Session, and his wife Margaret Balfour, daughter of Michael Balfour of Burleigh. The 1st Baron Balfour of Glenawley was his younger brother.

His residence was Burleigh Castle near Kinross. He was knighted at the opening of Parliament in 1592.

== Rebel ==
In February 1584, King James VI of Scots confirmed Michael Balfour and his wife Christine Beaton's charter for his daughter Margaret Balfour of lands in Perthshire and Stirling, including Skeoch Mill at Bannockburn.

In the early 1590s, Balfour supported and intrigued with the rebel 5th Earl of Bothwell along with other landowners, including John Wemyss of Logie and Archibald Wauchope of Niddrie. He had initially fought against Lord Bothwell, resisting his assault on Holyrood Palace and was involved in the summary execution of some of Bothwell's followers. He joined with Bothwell and was captured near Dalkeith Palace in August 1592, but released after questioning. In October 1592 he crossed the border into England and played cards and football with Bothwell at Netherby Hall. He was imprisoned in Edinburgh Castle in November 1592 and faced banishment. It was thought that James VI would order the demolition of Burleigh Castle.

== Travel abroad ==
In May 1598, Sir William Stewart of Houston was sent on an embassy to Denmark, escorting Ulrik, Duke of Holstein, who had been travelling in England and Scotland, and returned in July. Michael Balfour accompanied them.

== Arms and armour ==
An Act of Parliament in December 1599 made Michael Balfour wealthy, directing landowners and people of standing to buy armour from him, for defence musters. Several men complained that Balfour tried to make them buy more armour than their rank and income demanded, or like James Blackadder of Tulliallan, already owned sufficient armour. In 1598 James VI had allowed Balfour to import arms from abroad, and historians regard this as a move to prepare for war in the event of death Queen Elizabeth, to ensure the succession of James to the throne of England. In 1602 Balfour was sent to buy weapons in the Dutch Republic for 2,000 troops to fight pretenders to his throne. He was in London in July 1602 and met the French ambassador Christophe de Harlay, Count of Beaumont.

Michael Balfour became a member of the Scottish Privy Council. He was sent to Italy in February 1604 to investigate the activities of Anthony Standen, who had been sent to announce the Union of Crowns, but became involved in schemes to convert theroyal family to Roman Catholicism.

He served as Scottish Ambassador to the Grand Duke of Tuscany and the Duke of Lorraine in 1606. In 1607 he was raised to the Peerage of Scotland as Lord Balfour of Burleigh, in the County of Kinross.

He died in March 1619.

== Marriage and children ==
Michael Balfour married Margaret Lundin, daughter of William Lundin of that Ilk, in 1591. She died in 1625.

He was succeeded in the lordship by his daughter Margaret. Margaret Balfour married Robert Arnot, a son of Robert Arnot of Fernie, and he adopted the name, Robert Balfour, 2nd Lord Balfour of Burleigh.

== Notes ==
Peerage of Scotland
New creation	Lord Balfour of Burleigh; 1607–1619	Succeeded by Margaret Balfour
