= Fernie Castle =

- Letham, Fife, Scotland
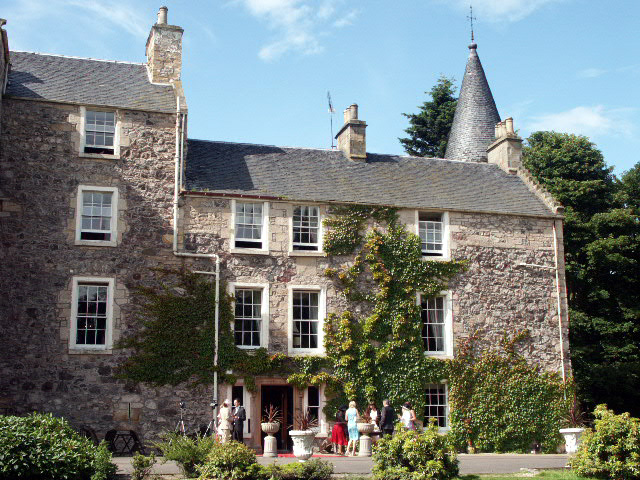

Site information
- Owner: MDJM Ltd

Location
- Location of Aberdour Castle within Fife
- Coordinates: 56°19′14″N 3°06′27″W

Site history
- Built: 1353; 673 years ago

Fernie Castle is an enlarged sixteenth-century tower house in north-east Fife, Scotland.

Originally built in an L-plan layout, it was later extended to include a three floor block which included a round tower at one of the corners. Situated just east of the village of Letham, the castle is now primarily used as a hotel which also caters to weddings.

When the Chinese real state company MDJM Ltd completed its acquisition on 26 June 2023, it was announced that the 14th-century tower house had undergone a renovation process and can cater for weddings with up to 180 guests.
