= Lord Balfour of Burleigh =

Title in the Peerage of Scotland

Lordship Balfour of Burleigh
- Quarterly, 1st & 4th: Argent, on a chevron sable, an otter's head erased of the first (Balfour of that Ilk); 2nd & 3rd: Or, a saltire and a chief gules, the latter charged with a mullet argent (Bruce)
- Creation date: 16 July 1607
- Created by: James VI
- Peerage: Peerage of Scotland
- First holder: Sir Michael Balfour
- Present holder: Victoria Bruce-Winkler, 9th Lady Balfour of Burleigh
- Heir presumptive: Hon. Laetitia Bruce-Winkler, Mistress of Burleigh
- Remainder to: Heirs general
- Subsidiary titles: Master of Burleigh
- Seat: Brucefield House
- Former seat: Burleigh Castle
- Motto: Balfour: Omne solum forti patria ("Every country is a brave man's homeland"); Bruce: Fuimus ("We have been)

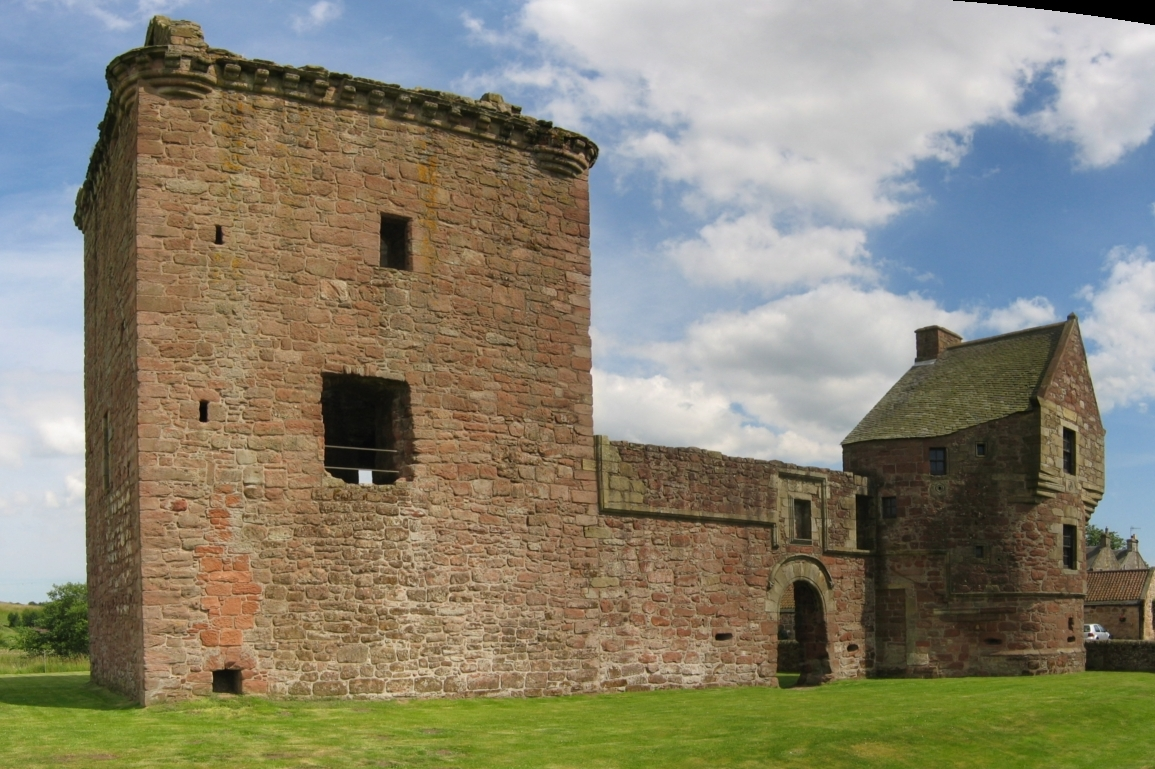
Burleigh Castle, the former seat of the Balfour family.

Lord Balfour of Burleigh, in the County of Kinross, is a title in the Peerage of Scotland. It was created in 1607 for Sir Michael Balfour.

He was succeeded by his daughter, Margaret, his only child. She married Robert Arnot, who assumed the surname of Balfour and sat as Lord Balfour of Burleigh in the Scottish Parliament in right of his wife. Their son, the third Lord, fought with the Covenanters at the Battle of Drumclog.

His grandson, Robert Balfour, the fifth Lord, was tried and convicted of the murder of schoolmaster Henry Stenhouse at Inverkeithing in 1709. He was sentenced to death in 1710 but escaped to freedom by dressing in his sister's clothes. He was primarily known as Master of Burleigh, the title for the heir to the peerage, as he never took his seat in Parliament when his father died in 1713. He took part in the Jacobite rebellion in 1715 and was attainted for his role. He died childless in 1757.

The lordship had been created by charter, a copy of which exists only in the family archives. The original charter did not specify right of succession. Robert Bruce (1795–1864), MP for Clackmannanshire, asserted his right to sit in the House of Lords as Lord Balfour of Burleigh and Lord Kilwinning. However, Walter Francis Balfour of Fernie, a male-line descendant of the second Lord, opposed Balfour on the grounds that he was the proper heir as heir male of the body. Robert Bruce died in 1864 before the case was decided, but his wife continued the case on behalf of their underage son, Alexander Hugh Bruce. On 21 July 1868, the House of Lords ruled in favour of the Bruces, determining that the original lordship was created with the remainder to heirs general (as evidenced by it being inherited by the original lord's daughter). On 19 March 1869, the attainder was reversed by an act of Parliament, Bruce's Restitution Act 1869 (32 & 33 Vict. c. 11 Pr.).

Alexander Hugh Bruce, the 6th Lord Balfour of Burleigh, was the great-great-grandson of Hon. Mary Balfour (d. 1758), daughter of the fourth Lord, and her husband Brigadier-General Alexander Bruce. Since 1869, the lordship has been held by the Bruce family. Lord Balfour of Burleigh was a Conservative politician and sat in the House of Lords as a Scottish representative peer from 1876 to 1921 and was Secretary of State for Scotland between 1895 and 1903. His second son, the seventh Lord, was a Scottish Representative Peer from 1922 to 1963. As of 2019, the title is held by his granddaughter, the ninth Lady, who succeeded his father in that year.

Another member of the Balfour family was James Balfour, 1st Baron Balfour of Glenawley (in the Peerage of Ireland). He was the younger brother of the first Lord Balfour of Burleigh.

The family seat now is Brucefield House, near Clackmannan. The original family seat was Burleigh Castle, near Kinross, which is now in ruins.

== Lords Balfour of Burleigh (1607) ==
- Michael Balfour, 1st Lord Balfour of Burleigh (d. 1619)
- Margaret Balfour, 2nd Lady Balfour of Burleigh (d. 1639), married to Robert Balfour, 2nd Lord Balfour of Burleigh (d. 1663)
- John Balfour, 3rd Lord Balfour of Burleigh (d. 1688)
- Robert Balfour, 4th Lord Balfour of Burleigh (d. 1713)
- Robert Balfour, 5th Lord Balfour of Burleigh (d. 1757) (forfeit 1715)
- Heirs but for the attainder:
  - Margaret Balfour (d. 1769), sister of the 5th Lord
  - Robert Bruce, Lord Kennet (1718–1785), nephew of Margaret
  - Alexander Bruce (1755–1808), son of Robert
  - Robert Bruce (1795–1864), son of Alexander
- Alexander Hugh Bruce, 6th Lord Balfour of Burleigh (1849–1921) (restored 1869)
- George John Gordon Bruce, 7th Lord Balfour of Burleigh (1883–1967)
- Robert Bruce, 8th Lord Balfour of Burleigh (1927–2019)
- Victoria Bruce-Winkler, 9th Lady Balfour of Burleigh (b. 1973)

The heir presumptive is the present holder's daughter the Hon. Laetitia Bruce-Winkler, Mistress of Burleigh (b. 2007).

== See also ==
- Balgarvie Castle
