= Robert Sellar =

Scottish-Australian merchant (1828–1900)

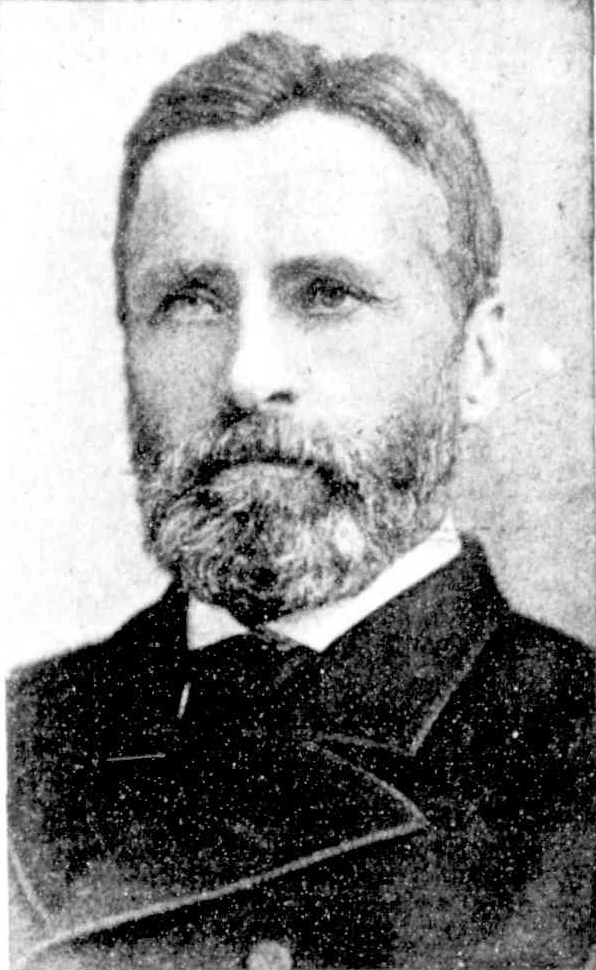
Robert Sellar

Robert Sellar (1828 in Scotland – 1900 in Melbourne, Australia) emigrated from Scotland in 1853 and became a prominent merchant in Melbourne,

Australia where he was the business partner of James McCulloch who went on to become a Premier of the state of Victoria.

== Family ==
Robert Sellar was the fourth son of Patrick Sellar (1780–1851) and Ann Craig.

His father, was unpopular because he took an active part in the Highland Clearances, while employed as factor to the Duke of Sutherland.

Robert's brothers were Thomas, a merchant in New Orleans, Patrick Plenderleath, a farmer in Scotland, William Young, John Alexander, a merchant who moved to England, David Plenderleath, an American merchant, and the youngest Alexander Craig Sellar, Scottish Advocate and MP.

Robert's nephew Walter Carruthers Sellar, son of his brother Patrick, became a school teacher and well known humorist writer.

Robert's elder brother William Young Sellar (1825–1890), an academic, married 1852, Eleanor Mary Dennistoun, daughter of wealthy Glasgow merchant Alexander Dennistoun of Golfhill (1790–1874).

== Life ==
Probably influenced by his sister's marriage into the Dennistoun family, Robert joined the mercantile firm of A J Dennistoun.

In 1853 Robert travelled to Melbourne in the same year as James McCulloch, both in the employment of Alexander and John Dennistoun, to manage a branch of Dennistoun Brothers and Company in Australia.

The Dennistoun family were shipping and commission agents importing and exporting goods. At one time they had branches in Glasgow, London, Liverpool, France, Melbourne, New York, and New Orleans (from where cotton was exported).

Companies included,

- J & A Dennistoun and Company, Glasgow
- Dennistoun, Cross and Company, London
- Dennistoun, Wood and Company, New York
- A & J Dennistoun and Company, New Orleans

On 2 April 1859 Robert Sellar married Matilda Charlotte Swyer at Christ Church, St Kilda, Melbourne. Matilda's brother Charles Robert Swyer was a civil engineer who had emigrated from Manchester to St Kilda to build Christ Church where construction started about 1854.

== McCulloch Sellar and Company ==
Closure of the Dennistoun Brothers office in Melbourne was announced in the Edinburgh Gazette.

The transcript begins,

Notice, Glasgow, September 30th 1861

The partnership carried on in Glasgow under the firm of Dennistoun, Inglis and Company and in Melbourne under the firm of Dennistoun Brothers and Company as merchants and commission merchants was this day dissolved by mutual consent.

The business will be carried on by the subscribers Messrs James McCulloch, Robert Sellar, and John Inglis (who have active management thereof) in conjunction with Messrs Leishman, Brothers and Company of London.

So it was, about 1862, following closure of the Dennistoun branch, James McCulloch and Robert Sellar went into business on their own account forming McCulloch, Sellar and Company. Having learnt their trade, by working for the Dennistoun Brothers, they imported goods into the colony, operated warehouses, and exported bales of wool.

The company also leased land for sheep farming from the crown. Sheep farming and the export of Merino wool was then a very profitable business. Even the famous tea clipper the Cutty Sark was at one time transporting bales of wool from Australia to England.

One of the businesses they acquired was a large sheep farming station at Mount Gipps in the outback of New South Wales known as the Mount Gipps Pastoral Company.

The 'Pastoral Possessions of New South Wales' published by William Hanson in 1889 records that circa 1885 the Mount Gipps Pastoral Holding (no 20) extended to 418,471 acres (169,349 hectares) at a rent of £1,307 per annum.

Sometime between 1883 and 1885 silver was discovered near a rocky outcrop on their property, known as the Broken Hill.

In 1885 the Broken Hill Proprietary Company was formed to raise funds to mine the silver, and so it was that the town of Broken Hill was established. It appears that James McCulloch and Robert Sellar did not acquire a mining lease or benefit.

The document 'Pastoral Possessions of New South Wales' suggests James McCulloch, Robert Sellar and James MacPherson also leased another pastoral holding at Illiliwa in New South Wales that extended to 96,926 acres (39,225 hectares) at a rent of £1,292 per annum.

A National Trust of Australia document records Robert Sellar living in 1889 at newly built Northbrook House, 1257 High Street, Malvern, Melbourne. The house was built for Donald Munro, son of James Munro, Scottish born businessman, temperance leader and politician, who established the Federal Bank and became Premier of Victoria in 1890.

Robert Sellar is described as a merchant, member of the firm McCulloch, Sellar, and Co, wool and commission merchants, agents for Lancashire Fire Insurance Co, and Merchants' Marine Insurance Co, with offices in the St James buildings.

The directories show Sellar in High Street, Malvern in 1890. Following the transfer of the ownership of Northbrook House to the Federal Bank of Australia in 1893, Sellar was listed in Alma Road, Caulfield.

== Death ==
The death of Robert Sellar on 5 September 1900 and an account of his life was reported in the Argus newspaper. Robert Sellar died at home in Malvern, Australia, a suburb of the city of Melbourne in the state of Victoria.

Robert was survived by his daughter Ella Matilda Sellar born 1866 at St Kilda. She married at St Georges Church, Malvern, in 1887, Francis Joseph Fisher who was born 24 Aug 1859 in South Australia. Francis was the son of Joseph Fisher, an accountant and politician who became a Member of the South Australian Legislative Council. Joseph was born Yorkshire, England in 1834, married Anne Wood Farrar in 1857, and died Fullarton, South Australia in 1907.
