= 1932 Dunbartonshire by-election =

UK Parliamentary by-election

The 1932 Dunbartonshire by-election was held on 17 March 1932. The by-election was held due to the resignation of the incumbent Conservative MP, John Thom. It was won by the Conservative candidate Archibald Cochrane.

Dunbartonshire by-election, 1932
Party	Candidate	Votes	%	±%
Unionist	Archibald Cochrane	16,749	43.5	−20.1
Labour	Tom Johnston	13,704	35.6	−0.8
National (Scotland)	Robert Gray	5,178	13.4	New
Communist	Hughie McIntyre	2,870	7.5	New
Majority		3,045	7.9	−19.3
Turnout		38,501		
Unionist hold		Swing		
