= RIBA Journal =

Royal Institute of British Architects magazine

The RIBA Journal
- September 2022 edition
- Editor: Eleanor Young
- Former editors: Hugh Pearman, Jonathan Glancey, Peter Murray, Malcolm MacEwen
- Categories: Architecture
- Frequency: Monthly
- Circulation: 25,160 (ABC June 2021)
- Publisher: Royal Institute of British Architects
- Founder: Royal Institute of British Architects
- Founded: 1893
- Company: Royal Institute of British Architects
- Country: United Kingdom
- Based in: London
- Language: English
- Website: www.ribaj.com
- ISSN: 0953-6973

The RIBA Journal (often known simply as the RIBAJ) is an architecture magazine and website published by the Royal Institute of British Architects, based in London. It has the largest circulation of any UK-originating architecture magazine. Alongside the monthly publication in print, the online edition is updated daily and has additional content.

== History ==
The RIBA has issued publications since its foundation in 1834, and the magazine evolved from these. It was established in 1893 as the Journal of proceedings of the Royal Institute of British Architects and was the same year renamed Journal of the Royal Institute of British Architects or simply The RIBA Journal. Until World War II it appeared fortnightly, then monthly. Until the 1940s it was usual for the RIBA Librarian also to be editor of the RIBA Journal. A notable example was Edward 'Bobby' Carter, from 1930–1946. From 1986 to 1987 it was rebranded The Architect: The Journal of the RIBA, then reverted to its previous title.

Between 1993 and 2008 the magazine was published in a joint venture with an outside publisher, the Builder Group, later absorbed into UBM plc. The RIBA kept a 25% stake. In 2008 the RIBA once again took 100% ownership, contracting out its publication to Atom Publishing. In 2012 the publication moved to RIBA Enterprises, the commercial wing of the Institute: since 2016 it has been published directly by the Institute. Part of RIBA Publishing, it operates largely on a self-financing commercial basis through advertising, sponsorship and non-member subscriptions. This arm's length relationship extends to its independent editorial voice, which is by policy not controlled by the Institute. In 2015 the magazine moved into new offices at 76 Portland Place designed by architects Theis + Khan in what had previously been the Institute of Physics building.

In 2012 the magazine launched a magazine supplement "Products in Practice" or PiP, which is published four times a year, edited by Jan-Carlos Kucharek. In 2013 both the RIBAJ and PiP were redesigned by Matt Willey, relaunching in September that year. In 2014 the website, ribaj.com, was also redesigned and relaunched, with numerous subsequent upgrades. The RIBA Journal operates a "digital first" policy whereby material is published first online. In January 2019 the cover was redesigned by Linda Byrne of consultancy Alphabetical Order. In 2022 it refocused its offering around design in the making looking at the process of making and opportunities for architects.

In 2009 and 2014 the RIBA Journal won the International Building Press National Journalism "Magazine of the Year" award in its non-weekly category In March 2016 a critical independent survey of the RIBA by another publication, Architects' Journal, asked the question "What does the RIBA do best?" Respondents voted for the RIBA Journal by a clear margin, with a high approval rating.

From February 2021, RIBA Journal has been edited by Eleanor Young. Jan-Carlos Kucharek is deputy editor, and Isabelle Priest managing editor. Chris Foges, previously editor of Architecture Today was appointed contributing editor.

== Campaigns and awards ==
In 2016 the RIBA Journal instigated the MacEwen Award, subtitled "architecture for the common good", named after its campaigning former editor Malcolm MacEwen and his town-planner wife Ann MacEwen. Other awards include Rising Stars for young construction professionals, and a writing competition in collaboration with the RIBA's Future Architects Network. In 2019 it launched a series of podcasts, RIBAJ Meets.

The RIBA Journal also publishes the annual RIBA Awards including the Stirling Prize and Royal Gold Medal for architecture.

== Circulation ==
The RIBA Journal has a circulation of 25,160 in June 2021.

== Archive ==
A digital archive since 2013 is available online to RIBA members and subscribers. Pre-2013 material can be located through the RIBA Library.

== Former editors ==
The editors since 1968 were:

- Hugh Pearman (2006–2020)
- Amanda Baillieu
- John Welsh
- Richard Wilcock
- Jose Manser
- David Pearce
- Jonathan Glancey
- Peter Murray
- Monica Pigeon
- Roger Barnard
- Malcolm MacEwen
