= Raeburn baronets =

Baronetcy in the Baronetage of the United Kingdom

The Raeburn Baronetcy, of Helensburgh in the County of Dunbarton, is a title in the Baronetage of the United Kingdom. It was created on 25 July 1923 for William Raeburn. He was head of the firm of Raeburn & Verel, Ltd, and also represented Dunbartonshire in the House of Commons as a Unionist.

Sir Digby Raeburn, son of Sir Ernest Manifold Raeburn, second son of the first Baronet, was a major general in the Scots Guards and Governor of the Tower of London.

The baronetcy is presently held by Sir Michael Edward Norman Raeburn, 4th Bt., Obl.S.B. (born 1954). He does not use the title.

== Raeburn Baronets, of Helensburgh (1923) ==
- Sir William Hannay Raeburn, 1st Baronet (1850 – 12 February 1934)
- Sir William Norman Raeburn, 2nd Baronet (1877–1947)
- Sir Edward Alfred Raeburn, 3rd Baronet (1919–1977)
- Sir Michael Edward Norman Raeburn, 4th Baronet (born 1954). He does not use the title.
