= Ballikinrain =

Castle in Stirling, Scotland

Coordinates: 56.0566°N 4.3083°W

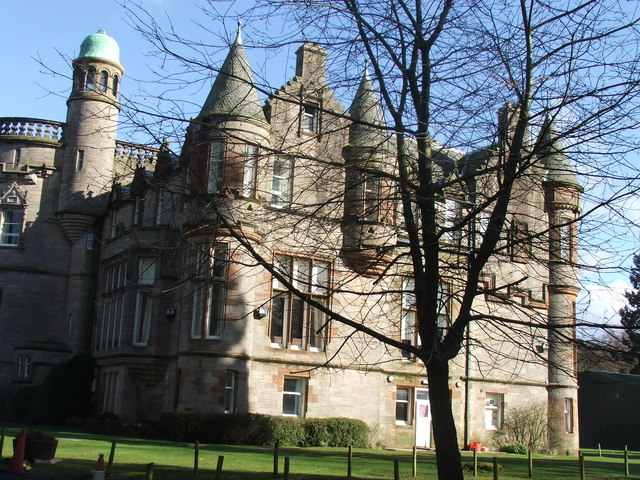
Ballikinrain Castle

Ballikinrain is an independent residential school in Stirling, central Scotland. It is run by CrossReach, a social care outreach arm of the Church of Scotland. The school is housed in the 19th-century Ballikinrain Castle, situated in the Parish of Killearn, 2 kilometres (1.2 mi) south-east of Balfron and 5 kilometres (3.1 mi) west of Fintry.

== History ==
Ballikinrain Castle was built in 1868 for Sir Archibald Orr-Ewing, (1818–1893) a Conservative Party politician. Orr-Ewing was Member of Parliament (MP) for Dunbartonshire from 1868 to 1892, and was created a baronet on 8 March 1886.

He commissioned David Bryce (1803–1876) to design a new house in the Scottish Baronial style, for his 4,500-acre (1,800 ha) estate. The location is alongside the Ballinkinrain Burn, which rises to the south, on the Earl's Seat (578 metres (1,896 ft)), and runs for about 4 kilometres (2.5 mi) across Ballikinrain Muir and through the estate, making in its descent a number of cascades, to the Endrick Water.

The castle was burned-out in June 1913, the blaze being attributed to suffragettes, causing £100,000 of damage. A three-year restoration was completed in 1916.

In the early 20th century Ballikinrain Castle hosted Glasgow Poor Children's Fresh-Air Fortnight accommodating about 60 poor children. For a short time it was a hotel. Later, on the outbreak of the Second World War in 1939, St. Hilda's School for Girls, a boarding school based at Liberton near Edinburgh, took up temporary residence at Ballikinrain Castle. After the war St Hilda's remained at Ballinkinrain, owing to the difficulty of securing a satisfactory renovation of the buildings at Liberton, which had been used by the army. The building is protected as a category B listed building.

Between 1950 and 1965 there was a tourist caravan and camping site, complete with site shop and outside swimming pool, within the grounds. The pool was fed by Campsie spring water.

Ballikinrain School was a non-denominational independent school run by Crossreach, a social care agency which is part of the Church of Scotland. The school provided care and education services for young people aged six to 16 years who were experiencing social, emotional and behavioural difficulties. In January 2013, the roll was 33. 23 young people were resident and ten were attending on a daily basis. The young people were placed there by 12 local authorities.

The school had a roll of 35 boys in 2009, aged between 8 and 14, including boarders and day pupils.

Ballikinrain School closed at the beginning of 2021 following the combined influence of Government policy and an organisational understanding of effective practice. CrossReach Residential Care and Education services are now offered in the form of community children's houses supported by a separate school, Erskine Waterfront Campus: www.crossreach.org.uk/our-locations/erskine-waterfront-campus.

Facebook groups have been established for anyone with an association to Ballikinrain or Geilsland residential schools.

=== The Future ===
In January 2024, planning permission was granted to return the building to a private residence, with the stables being converted to housing. Two dilapidated cottages in the grounds will be demolished and replaced.
