= Governor Cochrane =

Governor Cochrane may refer to:

- Archibald Cochrane (politician) (1885–1958), Governor of British Burma from 1936 to 1941
- Thomas John Cochrane (1789–1872), Governor of Newfoundland from 1825 to 1834
