= Peter Murray (architectural writer) =

British architectural writer

Murray's voice
recorded 2012, as part of an audio description of Bedford Park for VocalEyes

Peter Gerald Stewart Murray OBE FRSA Hon. FRIBA (born 6 April 1944) is a British writer and commentator on architecture and the built environment.

He co-founded New London Architecture and is a past chairman of the London Society, and a past master of the Worshipful Company of Chartered Architects. He is a keen cyclist and campaigner for cycling issues. In 2025, he announced a bid to become Mayor of London in 2028 as an independent candidate.

== Education ==
Murray studied at the RWA School of Architecture and the Architectural Association School of Architecture, London, in the 1960s.

== Career ==
Murray was editor of Building Design and then the RIBA Journal. In 1983, he launched Blueprint magazine with Deyan Sudjic; this was followed by Eye, the international review of graphic design and Tate magazine for the Tate Gallery. He has worked on major projects around the world including Broadgate in the UK, Taipei 101, Taiwan, Union Square in Hong Kong, Avant Seine in Paris and Hudson Yards and One World Trade Center in New York City. In 2004, Murray launched the first London Architecture Biennale (now the London Festival of Architecture) in Clerkenwell.

He is president of Wordsearch Communications Ltd, a consultancy explaining and promoting architecture, planning and the built environment.

A prolific author, his works include The Saga of Sydney Opera House, A passion to build and Architecture and Commerce.

In December 2025, Murray announced a bid to become the next Mayor of London in 2028 as an "actively non-political" independent. At a March 2026 lunch he said he was motivated to stand due to the importance of the built environment to every Londoner, believing the lack of affordable housing was the biggest factor driving inequality in the capital, and criticising current mayor Sadiq Khan for not engaging with the built environment sector.

=== Appointments ===
He has been chairman of the London Society (stepping down in 2021), and of New London Architecture, master of the Worshipful Company of Chartered Architects, deputy chairman of the Bedford Park Society (he is convenor of the society's planning steering group and an architectural advisor), and a board member (2017-2023) of Be First, an urban regeneration company wholly owned by Barking and Dagenham Council, and the Center for Active Design (until December 2019). Murray was also a member of the Mayor of London's Design Advisory Group, and (2017-2024) its successor, the Mayor's Design Advocates.

He is a member of the Construction Industry Cycling Commission, and the Academy of Urbanism. He is on the board of the Association of Architectural Organizations.

== Honours and awards ==
Murray was made a fellow of the Royal Society of Arts in 1989 and an Honorary Fellow of the Royal Institute of British Architects in 1999. Murray was appointed Officer of the Order of the British Empire (OBE) in the 2021 Birthday Honours for services to leadership in the arts, architecture, city planning, design and publication and to charity.

== Charity work ==
In 2005, Murray started the Cycle to Cannes charity bike ride. In 2013, he took part in a 6000 km cycle ride for charity from Portland, Oregon to Portland Place, London researching the implementation of cycling strategies in US cities.
