= 1936 Dunbartonshire by-election =

UK Parliamentary by-election

The 1936 Dunbartonshire by-election was held on 18 March 1936. The by-election was held due to the appointment as Governor of Burma of the incumbent Conservative MP, Archibald Douglas Cochrane. It was won by the Labour candidate Thomas Cassells.

Dunbartonshire by-election, 1936
Party	Candidate	Votes	%	±%
Labour	Thomas Cassells	20,187	48.1	+6.2
Unionist	Arthur Paterson Duffes	19,203	45.7	−4.6
SNP	Robert Gray	2,599	6.2	−1.6
Majority		984	2.4	N/A
Turnout		41,989	68.6	−11.9
Labour gain from Unionist		Swing	+5.4	
