= William Young Sellar =

British academic (1825–1890)

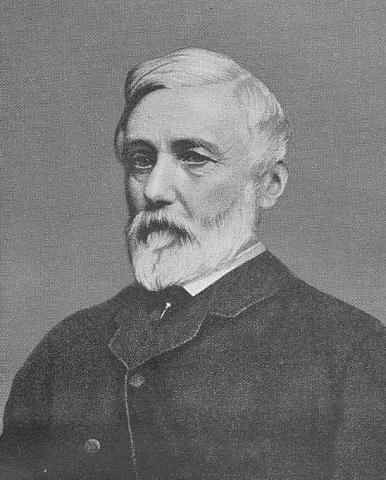
William Young Sellar

William Young Sellar FRSE LLD (22 February 1825 – 12 October 1890) was a Scottish classical scholar and Professor of Humanity at the University of Edinburgh.

== Life ==
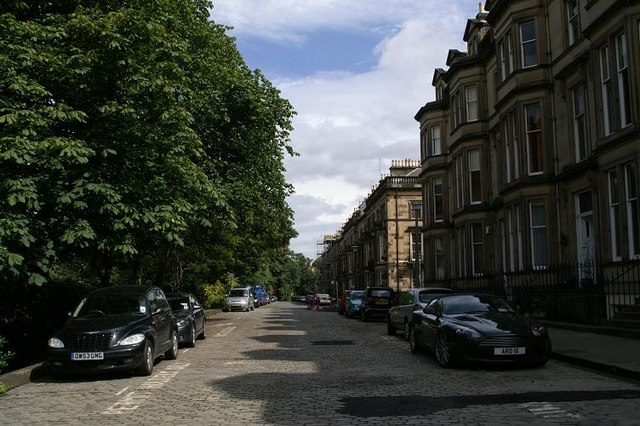
Buckingham Terrace, Edinburgh

Sellar was born at Morvich in Sutherland the son of Patrick Sellar of Westfield, Morayshire and his wife Anne Craig of barmuckity, Moray. He was educated at the Edinburgh Academy 1832 to 1839 (dux in his final year) and afterwards studied classics at the University of Glasgow. He entered Balliol College, Oxford, as a Snell Exhibitioner. Graduating with a first-class in classics, he was elected fellow of Oriel, and, after holding assistant professorships at Durham, Glasgow and St Andrews, was appointed professor of Greek at St Andrews (1859). In 1863 he was elected professor of humanity in Edinburgh University, and occupied that chair until his death.

In Edinburgh he lived at 15 Buckingham Terrace in the West End, near Dean Bridge.

Sellar was a 19th century classical scholar, and was remarkably successful in his endeavours to reproduce the spirit rather than the letter of Roman literature.

In 1864 he was elected a Fellow of the Royal Society of Edinburgh his proposer being Alexander Campbell Fraser. He was also awarded honorary doctorates (LLD) from both St Andrews University and the University of Dublin.

He died at Kenbank, St John's Town of Dalry in Kirkcudbrightshire on 12 October 1890.

== Family ==
He was brother to Robert Sellar and Alexander Craig Sellar, uncle to Andrew Lang.

In 1851 he married Eleanor Dennistoun, daughter of Alexander Dennistoun. They had at least five children. Their daughter Constance Helen married William Mackintosh Macleod, son of The Very Rev. Norman Macleod. Eleanor described her husband in a chapter of Recollections and impressions (1907), and their life in the remainder of the memoir.

== Recognition ==
Sellar is commemorated on the south wall of Balliol College Chapel, together with a memorial to his brother Alexander Craig Sellar (MP for Haddington Burghs and Partick).

== Publications ==
- The Roman Poets of the Republic (1863 plus later editions)
- The Roman Poets of the Augustan Age (1877 plus later editions)
- Horace and the Elegiac Poets (1892) -the 1899 edition has a memoir by Andrew Lang

A number of articles on Latin literature (including on Catullus, Roman Literature, Lucretius and Petronius) in the Encyclopædia Britannica, 9th edition, 1875–89.
