= 1926 Dunbartonshire by-election =

UK Parliamentary by-election

The 1926 Dunbartonshire by-election was held on 29 January 1926. The by-election was held due to the appointment to the Court of Session of the incumbent Conservative MP, David Fleming. It was won by the Conservative candidate John Thom.

Dunbartonshire by-election, 1926
Party	Candidate	Votes	%	±%
Unionist	John Thom	12,680	48.0	−7.8
Labour	William Martin	11,610	43.9	−0.3
Liberal	William Reid	2,146	8.1	New
Majority		1,070	4.1	−7.5
Turnout		26,436	75.0	−0.6
Unionist hold		Swing	-3.8	
