= Arthur Acland Allen =

British politician (1868–1939)

Arthur Acland Allen

Arthur Acland Allen (11 August 1868 – 20 May 1939) was a British Liberal Party politician who served as a member of parliament (MP) between 1906 and 1918.

== Biography ==
Allen was the son of Peter Allen, manager of the Manchester Guardian and of Sophia Russell Allen, daughter of J. E. Taylor, founder of the Manchester Guardian. His mother died while giving birth to him. His brother Charles Peter Allen was also a Liberal MP.

Allen was educated at Rugby School and University College, Oxford, where he was a classical scholar. He was called to the bar in 1893. He was a member of the London County Council from 1899 to 1913, was an alderman from 1920 to 1925. He chaired various committees, and was deputy chairman of the Council from 1908 to 1909.

Allen was first elected to the House of Commons at the 1906 general election as MP for Christchurch in Hampshire. It was his third attempt to enter the House of Commons, having stood unsuccessfully in Thornbury in 1895 and in the Eastern Division of Dorset in 1900 general election (losing in 1900 by only 96 votes).

Christchurch had been held by the Conservative Party since 1885, and at the general election in January 1910, Allen lost his seat to a Conservative. At the next general election, in December 1910, he stood instead in the Scottish constituency of Dunbartonshire, where he won the seat. However, at the 1918 general election he was not one of the 159 Liberal candidates to receive the "coalition coupon", and was overwhelmingly defeated by the Coalition Conservative candidate Sir William Raeburn; Allen was pushed into a poor third place behind the Labour Party candidate, winning a meagre 13% of the votes.

After his defeat in 1918, he did not stand for Parliament again.

Allen married Gladys Hope Walker (1875-1957) at St Stephen's Church, Kensington, and the couple had three daughters:

- Elizabeth Acland Allen (1901-1969)
- Margaret Hope Acland Allen (1902-1967)
- Barbara Susan Acland Allen (1905-1981)

He died 20 May 1939 aged 70.

Parliament of the United Kingdom
Preceded by Kenneth Balfour	Member of Parliament for Christchurch; 1906 – January 1910	Succeeded by Henry Page Croft
Preceded by J. D. White	Member of Parliament for Dunbartonshire; December 1910 – 1918	Succeeded by Sir William Raeburn
