= Worshipful Company of Chartered Architects =

Livery company of the City of London

The Worshipful Company of Chartered Architects is the 98th Livery Company of the City of London. The company was established in 1984, was granted Livery status in 1988 and received a Royal Charter in 2019. The Company promotes quality architecture in the City of London through education as well as its awards programmes.

Its annual New City Architecture Award is given to the building which is deemed to make the most significant contribution to the streetscape and skyline of the City of London in the qualifying period. It also supports architectural scholarship by awarding an annual student travel award, student drawing prizes and prizes for art at the four City of London schools. It also supports a range of other charities which are related to the city.

Since 2012, Chartered Architects have had links with the Orpington Sea Cadets, officially known as Training Ship Whirlwind.

The Company ranks ninety-eighth in the order of precedence for Livery Companies, its motto is Firmnesse, Commodite, Delyte (from a saying, attributed to ancient Roman architect Vitruvius), and its Church is St Lawrence Jewry.

== Notable people ==
- Peter Murray, architecture writer and former master of the company
- Michael Welbeck, architect and town planner and former master of the company
- Michael West, founding member who was elected master for 2001–2002
