= Patrick Sellar =

Scottish lawyer, factor and sheep farmer (1780–1851)

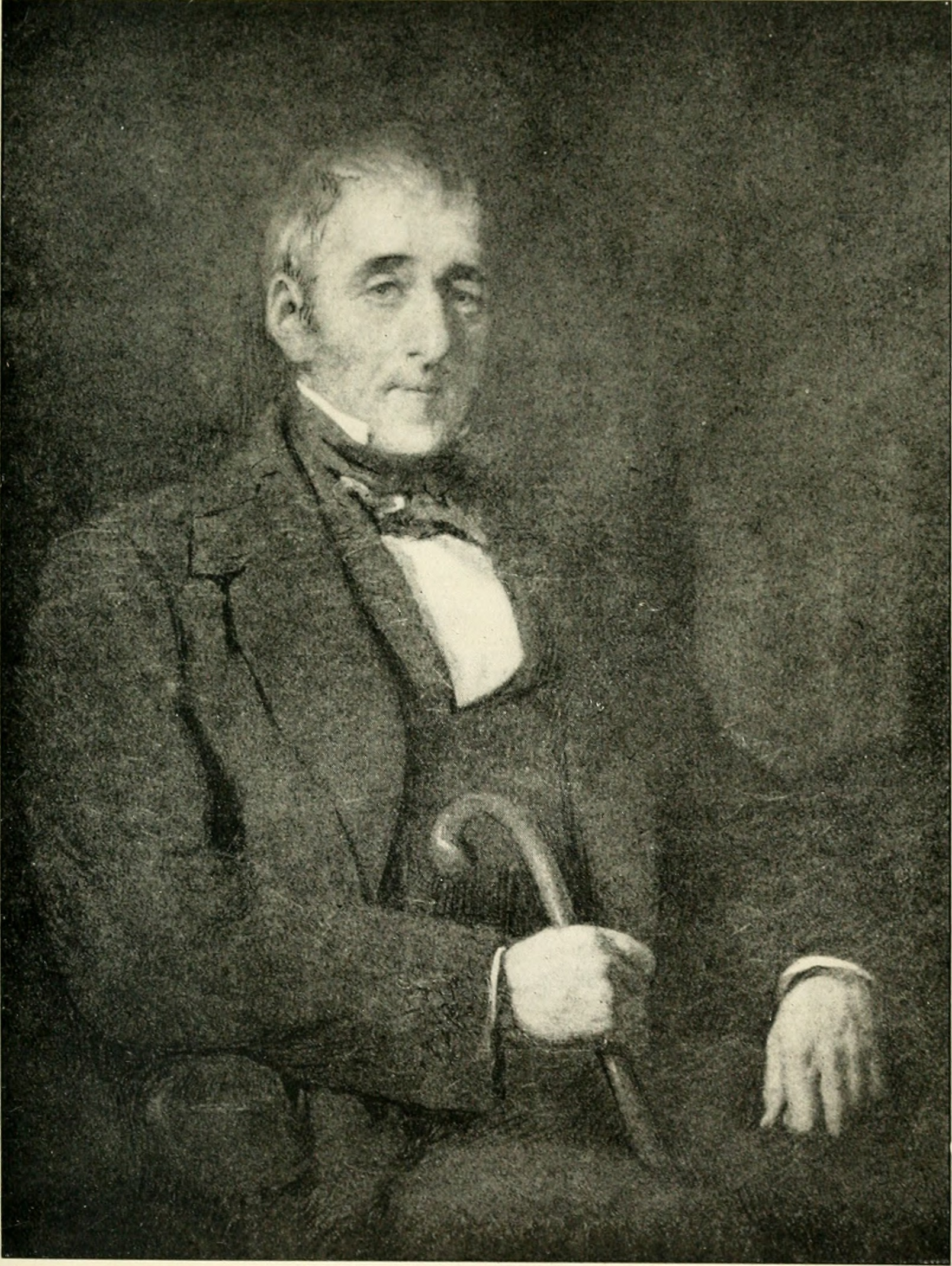
- Sellar's portrait in Recollections and Impressions 1907
- Born: 5 December 1780; Elgin, Moray
- Died: 20 October 1851 (aged 70); Elgin, Morayshire
- Known for: Role in the Highland Clearances

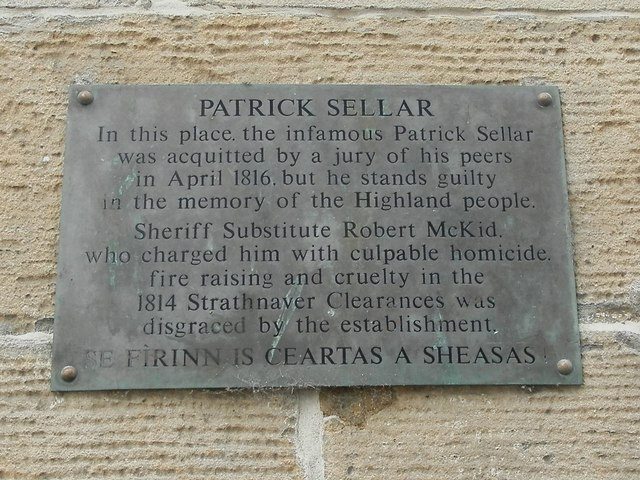
Plaque in Inverness

Patrick Sellar (1780–1851) was a Scottish lawyer, factor and sheep farmer. He had a prominent and controversial role in the Highland clearances as factor on the Sutherland Estate, a particularly large landholding in the Scottish Highlands.

He was employed as factor by the Sutherland Estate in 1811, in a joint (but subordinate) position with William Young. The estate had started some clearances, integral to their programme of agricultural improvements. Whilst clearances in 1812 went reasonably smoothly, in 1813 Sellar failed to negotiate successfully with angry resistance in the Strath of Kildonan. A state of confrontation existed for more than six weeks and concessions ultimately had to be made by the estate to defuse the situation. In 1814, Sellar had the job of clearing some of the residents of Strathnaver. His actions here gave rise to a number of charges brought by the sheriff-substitute Robert McKid, who was an enemy of Sellar. The most serious of these was culpable homicide. Sellar was acquitted at his trial in April 1816, but has remained as the focus for much of the anger and indignation arising from the clearances. Sellar and Young were replaced by a new factor later in 1817, and the Sutherland estate continued with even larger clearances, particularly in 1818-1820.

Sellar remained on the Sutherland estate as a tenant sheep farmer, becoming successful and well-respected by others in the sheep and wool sector. In 1838 Sellar bought a sheep farm at Morvern in Argyll, thereby becoming a landowner.

Sellar was keen to express his opinions on the management of the Highlands, writing highly emphatic letters on the subject. He never deviated from his view that the Highland clearances were the correct course of action. As a lawyer he had had a very confrontational manner, clearly enjoying dispute and, by his own admission, being too willing to break someone in the courts. His precise view of the law is, in the eyes of some historians, his most believable defence against the charges on which he was tried: that he would always follow the process of law precisely.

== Early life and career ==
Patrick Sellar was born in Elgin in Morayshire, in December 1780. This low-lying coastal agricultural area was at the forefront of agricultural experiment in northern Scotland, and Sellar's family was involved in agricultural improvement in the northeast of Scotland between 1760 and 1800. Sellar's father, Thomas, was the son of a Banffshire stonemason who, in the more accessible Scottish education system, was able to send Thomas to Edinburgh University to study law. Thomas then returned to Elgin as a trained solicitor and found work in the country estates of the region. He soon became the leading solicitor of the area, building up a fine reputation and a status much advanced from his father's lowly origins.

Patrick Sellar also studied law at Edinburgh. He then trained in his father's law practice, engaged in work for landowners who were improving and rearranging their farmlands, putting in drainage and building new farm buildings, especially on the cereal farms. Here Sellar saw in operation the theories he had learnt at Edinburgh University. The ideas of Adam Smith and Dugald Stewart were becoming dominant when the younger Sellar was a student. Given this educational environment, Sellar came to think of himself as a man of science and a product of the Scottish Enlightenment.

His father's business provided some degree of training for the factors on the Seafield estate, a major client of Thomas's law firm. Among these trainees were Cosmo Falconer and Robert Mackid, both of whom Patrick encountered when he moved to Sutherland.

Patrick Sellar was clearly influenced by the upwardly mobile story of his family; his grandfather had been a cottar in the hills of Banff but was cleared by an improving landlord. Patrick interpreted this as a moral tale (which he was known to share with others): the shock of eviction setting his family on the path of self-improvement.

== Move to Sutherland ==
The Sellar family were involved in the building of a harbour at Burghead, Thomas as an investor and Patrick carrying out legal work. (Note: The old settlement was largely demolished and a new town was built, with a grid-pattern street layout that carried the names of the investors, including Sellar Street.) As the building work finished in 1809, some of the investors travelled on the harbour's new packet service to Dunrobin Bay in Sutherland. Patrick Sellar accompanied the group, which included William Young. Young was sixteen years older than Sellar, and had an impressive practical record of agricultural improvement in Morayshire. They were looking for new business opportunities: Young was hoping to persuade Lord and Lady Stafford, owners of the Sutherland Estate, to invest in this new shipping service for Sutherland, which they did. (Note: The owners of the Sutherland Estate had a number of different titles over the years, so giving them a confusing sequence of seemingly unrelated names. Elizabeth Sutherland inherited the Sutherland Estate at the age of 1, so becoming the Countess of Sutherland. She married George Leveson-Gower, Viscount Trentham in 1785, who, by the time Sellar arrived in Sutherland, had inherited the title of Marquis of Stafford; she became the Marchioness of Stafford. More informally, they were addressed as Lord and Lady Stafford, though her tenants still called Lady Stafford 'the Countess' [of Sutherland], and she was also called 'Lady Sutherland' by many people. In the last year of her husband's life, he was made Duke of Sutherland, so her formal title became Duchess of Sutherland.)

Although, on a clear day, the hills of Sutherland are visible from the coast of Moray, Young and Sellar had never been there before. They were surprised to see the antiquated, unimproved farming techniques which contrasted with the modernised farms in their home county. They soon made contact with the Staffords. To prove the seriousness of their interest in Sutherland, Young and Sellar took a lease (in Sellar's name) for Culmaily, a farm in the Southeast of the estate. They agreed to pay above the rent that was usual in the area – the rent for Culmaily was 25% higher than for the adjacent farms – causing concern among the neighbouring tenants. They then set about using this property as a model for modern agricultural improvement. An up-to-date drainage scheme was installed, though some marshy areas were used to grow flax (which had not previously been grown in Sutherland). A lint mill was erected to process the flax, as was a new house and other agricultural buildings. The drainage resulted in greatly increased crops of potatoes, oats and wheat. The reorganisation of the farm involved the eviction of 213 people out of a total of 253 who had previously lived and worked there. Young and Sellar expected them to be employed in industries being set up elsewhere on the estate. Whilst applying their energies to demonstrating their methods, the pair offered much free advice on improvement to Lady Stafford, which she was keen to hear. This happened at a key moment for the estate, which had recently started on a large programme of improvement.

== The Sutherland estate ==
In 1809, when Patrick Sellar first visited the county of Sutherland, the Sutherland estate was the major landowner in the county. Some purchases between 1812 and 1816 increased the holding, calculated on rental value, to 63% of the county. It was managed from Dunrobin Castle, with the estate factor usually taking one of the farms in the immediate vicinity of the castle to run on his own account as part of his remuneration for the role.

Whilst Lady Stafford was a child, her guardians had made some modest progress at improving the rental income by modernisation. Some tenants were cleared in 1772 and some of the tacksmen were removed at about that time. The establishment of fishing villages and the introduction of sheep, though considered, were not done due to a lack of the necessary capital to invest in these changes. This shortage of money continued in the early years of the Staffords' marriage, however, in 1799 some clearances were carried out, together with rent increases. Then, in 1803, her husband inherited the huge fortune of the Duke of Bridgewater. This made Lord Stafford arguably the richest man in Britain and he was happy to channel a large part of that wealth into his estates in Sutherland, one of the poorest parts of the country.

Despite the conventions of the day, much of the Sutherland estate's decision-making was delegated to Lady Stafford by her husband. She was impatient for progress. Most of the leases on the estate did not expire until 1807, but planning got underway immediately. The plans centred around establishing large sheep farms in the interior, eliminating the tacksman class, and establishing alternative occupations for the displaced tenants, housing them in crofts on the coast. These included fishing, for which harbours and villages had to be built, new coal workings at Brora and associated salt pans. The estate went through a sequence of factors: David Campbell was hired in 1802, but Lady Stafford was critical of his lack of progress. He left in 1807. The replacement was Cosmo Falconer. After Young and Sellar's arrival in 1809 and their frequent advice to Lady Stafford, Falconer's position was being steadily undermined. Eventually, in August 1810 he tendered his resignation, with effect from Whitsun 1811. (Note: 2 June 1811)

== Appointment as factor ==
After Falconer's resignation, William Young and Patrick Sellar were appointed in the position of factor, as a joint role. From the outset, this arrangement was poorly defined. Sellar had a sequence of letters with Lady Stafford over this, trying to establish an equal status with Young. His persistence led her to consider terminating his employment when he had just taken up his duties. Lady Stafford's frustration over her new employee is evidence of Sellar's poor interpersonal skills. The conclusion was that Young had the senior position and was responsible for 'progressive improvements' on the estate, whilst Sellar collected rents, kept accounts, drafted leases, ensured tenants complied with the terms of their leases and enforced the protection of plantations and game on the estate.

== Clearances ==
The first clearances under the factorship of Young and Sellar were in Assynt in 1812, under the direction of Sellar, establishing large sheep farms and resettling the old tenants on the coast. Sellar had the assistance of the local tacksmen in this and the process was conducted without unrest, despite the unpopularity of events. However, in 1813, planned clearances in the Strath of Kildonan were accompanied by riots: an angry mob drove prospective sheep farmers out of the valley when they came to view the land, and a situation of confrontation existed for more than 6 weeks, with Sellar failing to successfully negotiate with the protesters. Ultimately, the army was called out and the estate made concessions such as paying very favourable prices for the cattle of those being cleared. This was assisted by landlords in surrounding districts taking in some of those displaced and an organised party emigrating to Canada. The whole process was a severe shock to Lady Stafford and her advisers, who were, in the words of historian Eric Richards, "genuinely astonished at this response to plans which they regarded as wise and benevolent".

Further clearances were scheduled in Strathnaver taking effect at Whitsun 1814. (Note: 26 May 1814) These were complicated by Sellar having successfully bid, in December 1813, for the lease of one of the new sheep farms on land that it was now his responsibility, as factor, to clear. (Note: Overall, the 1814 Strathnaver clearance was part of the removal of 430 families from both Strathnaver and Brora in 1814: an estimated 2000 people.) In later years, Sellar claimed that he had bid for this lease on the spur of the moment. In his role as factor, he was legally precise in issuing the required notices of eviction to those being resettled, doing this in January 1814 in conjunction with rent collections. In March, Sellar's shepherds started to burn the heather on the hillsides that would soon make up his sheep farm. This was a standard management technique to promote new grass growth to feed sheep. It caused consternation among the outgoing tenants, as it deprived their cattle of food, so putting them in poor condition for their imminent sale. A further problem was that Young was slow in organising the setting out of the new coastal lots, and in March and April, those under notice of eviction had no details on where they were to go: each needed time to build a house. At Young's request, Sellar made concessions to some tenants, allowing them to stay in their properties a little longer, but this just created confusion among those evicted. The delay was a problem for Sellar: his newly purchased flock of sheep was temporarily housed at his farm at Culmaily, but were short of food due to the level of overstocking and started to die.

Some tenants moved in advance of the date in their eviction notice; others stayed until the eviction parties arrived. As was normal practice, the roof timbers of cleared houses were destroyed to prevent re-occupation after the eviction party had left. On 13 June 1814, this was done by burning at Badinloskin, the house occupied by William Chisholm. Accounts vary, but it is possible that his elderly and bedridden mother-in-law was still in the house when it was set on fire. In James Hunter's understanding of events, Sellar ordered her to be immediately carried out as soon as he realised what was happening. The old lady died six days later. Eric Richards suggests that the old woman was carried to an outbuilding before the house was destroyed.

== Robert Mackid ==
Sellar had made an enemy of the sheriff-substitute of Sutherland, Robert Mackid, by catching him poaching on the Sutherland estate. This incident in the winter of 1813-1814 was actually a second offence: Sellar had warned Mackid about poaching in the spring of 1811. Lady Stafford decided to deal with the embarrassment of the county's law officer breaking the law by declaring an amnesty for 24 poachers, with Mackid's name included. Mackid now intended to discredit Sellar in any way he could. Sellar's precise view of the law meant he felt Mackid had no right to his legal position. The two were now implacable enemies.

== The trial ==
Sellar was charged by Mackid with culpable homicide and arson. As the trial approached, the Sutherland estate was reluctant to assist Sellar in his defence, distancing themselves from their employee. He was acquitted of all charges at his trial on 23 April 1816. The estate were hugely relieved, taking this as a justification of their clearance activity. Robert Mackid had to leave the county to rebuild his career elsewhere, providing Sellar with a grovelling letter of apology and confession.)

== Dismissal and famine ==
William Young was keen to relinquish his role on the Sutherland estate. After an extensive review of the estate over the summer of 1816 by James Loch, Young's resignation was accepted. This left the problem of Sellar, and now Loch was prepared to lay out the deficiencies of Sellar's personality for the role of estate factor to the Staffords. To some extent, this put Sellar in the role of scapegoat for all the problems on the estate, rather than just those of Sellar's own creation. The intended replacement factor was Frances Suther, but he was not immediately available, so Sellar remained in post until Whitsun 1817.

The winter of 1816/17 was severely affected by famine (as was much of Western Europe). As factor, Sellar was responsible for buying relief supplies for the tenantry. Rent collections fell as the famine struck. Sellar's plans for purchase of supplies were regarded as over-generous by the estate, so there was great hardship in many parts of Sutherland. Sellar started advocating emigration of the impoverished population and eventually Loch started to adopt the same thinking. It could be considered paradoxical that Sellar was working hard to provide famine relief to the tenants of the interior regions who he believed should be removed to provide a more economically rational method of management of the estate. The famine relief was provided as a loan to tenants, and Loch became depressed that it was unlikely that this would ever be paid off.

== Sellar as sheep farmer ==
Sellar remained as the tenant of the new sheep farm in Strathnaver, Rhiloisk. The delays in moving his stock into Strathnaver in 1814 had cost him dearly. However, the death of Sellar's father in August 1817 meant that he inherited a rental of about £1,000. With this extra income available, he applied his enormous energy to sheep farming and soon became much respected in the industry. He was a major tenant of the Sutherland estate, and he continued an extensive correspondence with them over the details of his tenancy. Further clearances added to his property in 1819, but he was specifically forbidden to take any part in the clearance activity.

Sellar died in Elgin in 1851 and is buried in Elgin Cathedral.

== Family ==
Sellar had a number of children with his wife Ann Craig of Barmakelty including:

- Thomas Sellar, a merchant in New Orleans
- Patrick Plenderleath Sellar, a farmer
- William Young Sellar (22 February 1825 – 12 October 1890), a Scottish classical scholar
- Robert Sellar (1828–1900) who became an Australian merchant
- John Alexander Sellar, a merchant in London
- David Plenderleath Sellar, an American merchant
- Alexander Craig Sellar MP (17 October 1835 – 16 January 1890), a Scottish lawyer and Liberal politician.

His grandson was the humorist Walter Carruthers Sellar who wrote the book 1066 and All That.

== In literature ==
Patrick Sellar features as a character in Iain Crichton Smith's novel, Consider the Lilies (1968).

== See also ==
- John Prebble
