= William Raeburn =

British politician

Sir William Hannay Raeburn, 1st Baronet (11 August 1850 – 12 February 1934) was a Scottish shipping businessman and Unionist Party politician who served as a member of parliament (MP) between 1918 and 1923.

Raeburn was a shipping magnate who founded in 1873 a shipping company called Raeburn & Dunn, with Captain Dunn. John Verel replaced Dunn in 1880 and the company was subsequently renamed Raeburn & Verel. By 1900 the company operated around 12 steamers, travelling to ports from Europe to America and the Far East. In 1902 Raeburn and Verel formed the Monarch Steamship Company Ltd. Raeburn was an important figure in the shipping industry in the West of Scotland and contributed to some of the shipping legislation which passed, including the Merchant Shipping Act and the Workmen's Compensation Act 1906. He came to live in Helensburgh towards the end of the 19th century, and his obituary in the Helensburgh & Gareloch Times describes how he was involved in various aspects of the shipping industry and how "in 1916 he was appointed President of the Chamber of Shipping by the shipowners of the United Kingdom". On his retirement from that post he was awarded with a knighthood.

At the 1918 general election, Raeburn was nominated as the Unionist Party candidate for the Dunbartonshire. He received the "coalition coupon" and as a "Coalition Unionist" he overwhelmingly defeated the sitting Liberal Party MP Arthur Acland Allen (who won a meagre 13% of the votes). Raeburn was re-elected in 1922 general election with a majority of only 0.8 percent over his sole opponent, the Labour Party candidate William Martin. He did not contest the 1923 general election, when Martin won the seat, and did not stand for Parliament again.

In the 1923 Birthday Honours, he was made a baronet, of Helensburgh.

Parliament of the United Kingdom
Preceded by Arthur Acland Allen	Member of Parliament for Dunbartonshire; 1918 – 1923	Succeeded by William Martin
Baronetage of the United Kingdom
New creation	Baronet (of Helensburgh); 1923–1934	Succeeded by William Norman Raeburn
