= Robert Gray (Scottish politician) =

Scottish politician and stonemason

Robert Gray (1895 – 12 April 1975), often known as Bertie Gray, was a Scottish nationalist politician.

Gray worked as a stonemason and in 1928 was a founding member of the National Party of Scotland. In 1929, he made two copies of the Stone of Scone, a coronation stone originally used by Scottish monarchs, but taken by Edward I of England to Westminster Abbey in 1296.

Gray stood unsuccessfully for the National Party at the 1932 Dunbartonshire by-election, then, when it merged into the Scottish National Party (SNP) in 1934, became the Assistant Secretary of the new party. He stood for the SNP in Dunbartonshire at the 1935 general election and a 1936 by-election in the seat, although he received less than 10% of the vote on each occasion. Disillusioned with the SNP, Gray joined the Progressives, an anti-Labour coalition, and in 1947 was elected to Glasgow Corporation, (see Glasgow City Council), representing Blythswood.

Gray retained his nationalist beliefs. In 1950, the Stone of Scone was removed from Westminster Abbey by Scottish nationalist activists. It was damaged in the process and John MacCormick, who had been involved in the plot, delivered it to Gray's stonemasonry business, where he arranged for his head stonemason to repair it. The following year, Gray and Ian Hamilton left the stone at Arbroath Abbey to be returned. Gray later refused to confirm whether this was the genuine stone, claiming that he had hidden a note in a brass tube inside the real stone, and that the text of this would be revealed to his wife, Marion, as part of his will.

From 1949 until 1972, Gray was a governor of the Glasgow School of Art, a member of the court of the University of Glasgow, and, in the 1950s, was a member of the committee of the Scottish Covenant Association. In 1974, Margo MacDonald persuaded him to rejoin the SNP, but he died the following year. Following his death, Marion claimed that he had not confirmed whether the Stone of Destiny was genuine, and that she was happy for the secret to die with him. However, Warwick Rodwell argues that a copy made by Gray would not have fooled experts, and that the claims of a forgery did not appear until the 1970s, making the story unlikely.
