= John Thom (British Army officer) =

British soldier, judge and politician (1891-1941)

Sir John Gibb Thom DSO MC

11th Chief Justice of Allahabad High Court
- In office 1 October 1937 – 19 February 1941
- Appointed by: George VI
- Preceded by: Shah Muhammad Sulaiman
- Succeeded by: Iqbal Ahmad

Member of House of Commons
- In office 27 October 1931 – 25 February 1932
- Monarch: George V
- Preceded by: Willie Brooke
- Succeeded by: Archibald Cochrane
- Constituency: Dunbartonshire
- In office 29 January 1926 – 30 May 1929
- Monarch: George V
- Preceded by: David Fleming
- Succeeded by: Willie Brooke
- Constituency: Dunbartonshire

Personal details
- Born: 1 August 1891
- Died: 19 February 1941 (aged 49)

Military service
- Allegiance: United Kingdom
- Branch/service: British Army
- Rank: Lieutenant General
- Unit: Gordon Highlanders
- Awards: Military Cross; Distinguished Service Order

Lieutenant-Colonel Sir John Gibb Thom DSO MC (1 August 1891 – 19 February 1941) was a British Army officer, judge and politician who was a Member of Parliament for Dunbartonshire from 1926 to 1929 and from 1931 to 1932. He also served as the 11th Chief Justice of Allahabad High Court from 1937 till his death.

== Career ==
Thom served with the Gordon Highlanders during the First World War and was awarded the Military Cross (MC) and the Distinguished Service Order (DSO) in 1917 for "conspicuous gallantry and devotion to duty". After his military career, he entered politics and was elected as a Member of Parliament for Dunbartonshire in 1926. He lost his seat in 1929 but returned to Parliament in 1931, resigning in 1932.

In 1937, Thom was knighted as part of the New Years Honours, and appointed Chief Justice of the Allahabad High Court, succeeding Sir Shah Muhammad Sulaiman, who had been elevated to the Federal Court of India. Thom served as Chief Justice from 1 October 1937 until his death on 19 February 1941. His tenure is particularly remembered for his firm defence of judicial independence. When the United Provinces government issued a circular criticising the liberal grant of bail by subordinate courts, Thom strongly objected and demanded its withdrawal and an apology, asserting the judiciary’s independence from executive interference.

Parliament of the United Kingdom
Preceded by David Fleming	Member of Parliament for Dunbartonshire; 1926 – 1929	Succeeded by Willie Brooke
Preceded by Willie Brooke	Member of Parliament for Dunbartonshire; 1931 – 1932	Succeeded by Archibald Cochrane
