= Archibald Orr-Ewing =

Scottish Conservative politician

Sir Archibald Orr-Ewing 1st Baronet

Member of Parliament for Dunbartonshire
- In office 1868 – 1892

Personal details
- Born: 4 January 1818
- Died: 28 November 1893 (aged 46)
- Citizenship: United Kingdom
- Party: Conservative
- Spouse: Elizabeth Lindsay Reid
- Children: 6
- Occupation: politician

Sir Archibald Orr-Ewing, 1st Baronet (4 January 1818 – 28 November 1893) was a Scottish Conservative Party politician.

The Orr Ewing Baronetcy, of Ballikinrain in the County of Stirling and of Lennoxbank in the County of Dunbarton, was created in the Baronetage of the United Kingdom on 8 March 1886 for the Conservative politician Archibald Orr-Ewing. He was the seventh son of William Ewing, a merchant of Glasgow, and Susan, daughter of John Orr, Provost of Paisley.

Archibald was Member of Parliament (MP) for Dunbartonshire from 1868 to 1892

Sir Archibald was a deputy lieutenant (D.L.) of Dunbartonshire and for Stirlingshire. He was a justice of the peace (J.P.) for Inverness-shire and for Stirlingshire. He was the Ensign-General of the Royal Company of Archers and Dean of Faculties at the University of Glasgow.

On 27 April 1847, he married Elizabeth Lindsay Reid and they had six children:

- Sir William Orr-Ewing, 2nd Bt. (1848–1903)
- Sir Archibald Ernest Orr-Ewing, 3rd Bt. (1853–1919)
- James Alexander Orr Ewing (1857-1900)
- Janet Edith Orr-Ewing (1858-1935), mother of the Labour politician Lucy Noel-Buxton
- John Orr Ewing (1859-1916), father of the pathologist Jean Orr-Ewing
- Charles Lindsay Orr-Ewing (1860–1903)

In 1864 Sir Archibald commissioned David Bryce to design his new home, Ballikinrain Castle, which was completed in 1868.

Coat of arms of Archibald Orr-Ewing
Crest A demi-lion rampant gules holding in its dexter paw a mullet as in the arms. Escutcheon Argent, a chevron gules, issuant therefrom a banner of the second thereon in the first quarter the arms of St Andrew viz, azure a saltire argent; between in chief two mullets gules and in base the sun in its splendour, the whole within a bordure indented gules charged with three martlets argent, two in chief and one in base. Motto Audaciter (Boldly)

Parliament of the United Kingdom
Preceded by Patrick Smollett	Member of Parliament for Dunbartonshire; 1868 – 1892	Succeeded by John Sinclair
Baronetage of the United Kingdom
New creation	Baronet (of Ballikinrain); 1886 – 1893	Succeeded by William Orr-Ewing
