= Thomas Cassells =

20th-century Scottish member of Parliament

Thomas Cassells (7 August 1902 – 16 June 1944) was a Labour Party politician in Scotland who served as Member of Parliament (MP) for Dunbartonshire from 1936 to 1941.

He won the seat at a by-election in March 1936, when his predecessor resigned to become Governor of Burma. A solicitor by training, Cassells held the seat until his appointment in 1941 as a Sheriff-substitute of Inverness, Elgin and Nairn, when he was succeeded at a by-election by Adam McKinlay. He also served as Dean of Guild for the Burgh for Falkirk.

Thomas Cassells was educated at Hamilton Academy where one of his teachers had been Robert Gibson, himself a former pupil of the school, and who was also to serve as a Labour MP (for Greenock) and over the same period, 1936–41. From the academy, Cassells studied at both Glasgow and Edinburgh universities. He was McFarlane Scholar in Law at Glasgow.

Parliament of the United Kingdom
Preceded by Archibald Cochrane	Member of Parliament for Dunbartonshire; 1936–1941	Succeeded by Adam McKinlay
