= Killearn =

Coordinates: 56.042°N 4.368°W

Killearn: Scottish Gaelic: Cill Fhearann, orig. Ceann Fhearann; Scots: Killern, orig. Kynhern
- Killearn Kirk and War Memorial

- Location within the Stirling council area
- Population: 1,910 (2020)
- OS grid reference: NS522860
  - Edinburgh: 50 mi (80 km)
  - London: 400 mi (650 km)
- Civil parish: Killearn
- Council area: Stirling
- Lieutenancy area: Stirling and Falkirk
- Country: Scotland
- Sovereign state: United Kingdom
- Post town: Glasgow
- Postcode district: G63
- Dialling code: 01360
- Police: Scotland
- Fire: Scottish
- Ambulance: Scottish
- UK Parliament: Stirling and Strathallan
- Scottish Parliament: Stirling

Killearn (Scottish Gaelic: Cill Fhearann, from orig. Ceann Fhearann, "Head/End of (the) Land/Territory"; until the 15th century when Ceann was replaced by Cill; denoting the presence of a house of worship) – is a small village of approximately 1800 people in the Stirling council area of Scotland.

The village is approximately 15 miles (24 kilometres) north of Glasgow, 7 miles (11 kilometres) east of Loch Lomond, and sits on the northwest flank of the Campsie Fells, most predominantly in the shadow of the volcanic plug of Dumgoyne, overlooking the confluence of the Endrick Water and Blane Water.

The Glengoyne whisky distillery, Loch Lomond and the Trossachs National Park and West Highland Way long-distance walking route are situated close to the village.

The residential special school of Ballikinrain was located in Killearn Parish, and catered for boys with disabilities from throughout Scotland. (The school closed in 2015).

The Church of Scotland congregation at Killearn Kirk falls under the Presbytery of Stirling, within the Synod of Forth. Within the Roman Catholic Church, Killearn falls under the Parish of Saint Anthony within the Roman Catholic Archdiocese of Saint Andrews and Edinburgh; although the Catholic community in Killearn is served by St. Anthony's Church in the neighbouring town of Balfron.

== George Buchanan ==
The 31-metre-high (102-foot) Buchanan Monument near the centre of Killearn commemorates the nearby 1506 birthplace of George Buchanan.

Killearn was the birthplace of the historian and humanist scholar George Buchanan, (February 1506 – 28 September 1582). Buchanan belonged to the Monarchomach movement, which advocated of a form of popular sovereignty. Born at The Moss, Killearn, a monument, (Obelisk), at the centre of the village is dedicated to Buchanan.
