= Alexander Wylie (politician) =

Scottish politician and printer (1839–1921)

- Born: 1839
- Died: 13 February 1921 (aged 81–82)
- Occupations: Politician, printer

Alexander Wylie (1839 – 13 February 1921) was a Scottish Tory politician and turkey red dyer and calico printer. He was Member of Parliament (MP) for Dumbartonshire from 1895 to 1906.

Wylie was the son of John Wylie. He worked for the Dumbarton Herald. After serving apprenticeship in 1855 he became editor of the Dumbarton Chronicle in 1856. He studied at Glasgow University and worked in Glasgow and Bristol with Archibald Orr Ewing & Co, a turkey red dyeing firm. He worked for William Stirling & Sons and became resident partner of the firm until it merged with other print companies.

Wylie was a critic of tea drinking. In 1904, in the House of Commons he stated that tea has injurious physical effects and he was concerned that poor people were spending a considerable portion of their income purchasing it. He described tea as a "deleterious stimulant".

== Selected publications ==
- Labour, Leisure and Luxury (1887)

Parliament of the United Kingdom
Preceded by John Sinclair	for Dunbartonshire; 1895 – 1906	Succeeded by J. D. White
