= Sir James Colquhoun, 4th Baronet, of Luss =

British politician (1804–1873)

Sir James Colquhoun, 4th Baronet, of Luss (7 February 1804 – 18 December 1873) was the Member of Parliament (MP) for Dumbartonshire from 1837 to 1841. He drowned in 1873 when he and others rowed out on Loch Lomond to bring back a deer for a Christmas feast. He and all aboard the boat were lost off Inch Lonaig during a sudden storm. In his memory his son, also James, had the church rebuilt.

Parliament of the United Kingdom
Preceded by Alexander Dennistoun	Member of Parliament for Dumbartonshire; 1837 – 1841	Succeeded by Alexander Smollett
Baronetage of Great Britain
Preceded by James Colquhoun	Baronet (of Luss); 1836 – 1873	Succeeded by James Colquhoun
Honorary titles
Preceded by The Duke of Montrose	Lord Lieutenant of Dunbartonshire; 1836 – 1873	Succeeded by Humphrey Ewing Crum-Ewing
