= David Fleming, Lord Fleming =

Scottish politician and judge

David Fleming
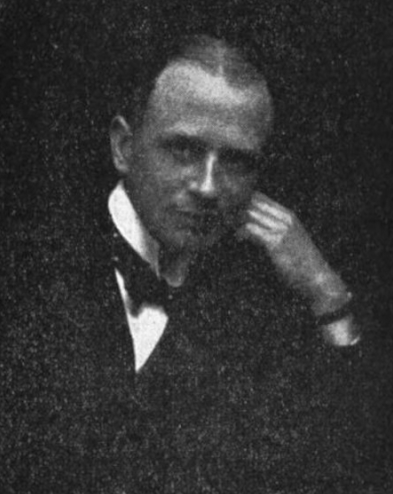

Member of Parliament for Dunbartonshire
- In office 1924-1926

Solicitor General for Scotland
- In office 1922-1923; 1924-1926

Personal details
- Born: 11 February 1877 Rutherglen, Scotland
- Died: 20 October 1944 (aged 67) Edinburgh, Scotland
- Spouse: Beatrice Swan (m. 1913)
- Education: University of Edinburgh; University of Glasgow
- Military career
- Allegiance: United Kingdom
- Units: Highland Light Infantry; Cameronians
- Conflicts: World War I
- Awards: Military Cross; Croix de Guerre

David Pinkerton Fleming, Lord Fleming MC (11 February 1877 – 20 October 1944) was a Scottish politician and judge who was Senator of the College of Justice. He was Solicitor General for Scotland from 1922 to 1923 and from 1924 to 1926 and a Member of Parliament for Dunbartonshire from 1924 to 1926.

== Life ==
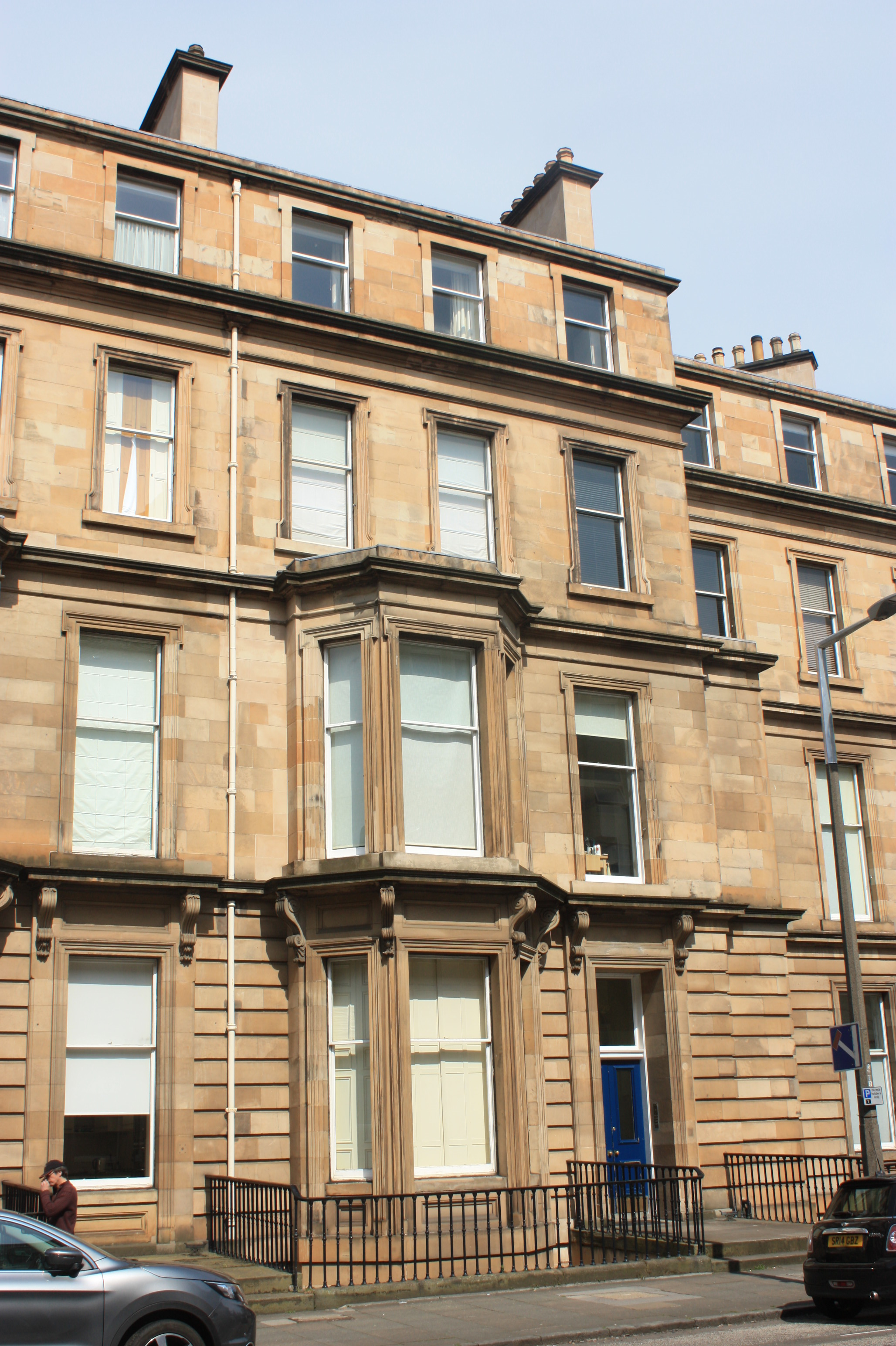
Fleming's house at 19 Drumsheugh Gardens, Edinburgh

He was born in Rutherglen near Glasgow on 11 February 1877, the son of John Fleming Writer to the Signet and his wife, Isabella Wark Pinkerton.

He was educated at Glasgow High School, the University of Edinburgh and University of Glasgow, and graduated MA in 1895, LLB in 1896.

He was called to the Scottish Bar in 1902. He was on active service with the Cameronians (he had originally been commissioned into the volunteer battalion of the Highland Light Infantry) during World War I, for which he was awarded the Military Cross and the Belgian Croix de Guerre. He took silk in October 1921.

He served as Solicitor General for Scotland from 1922 to 1923 and from 1924 to 1926, and was Unionist Member of Parliament for Dunbartonshire from 1924 to 1926.

He was appointed to the Court of Session bench on 19 December 1925, with the judicial title Lord Fleming. He replaced Lord Cullen, who had retired. He was appointed an Honorary Bencher of Middle Temple in 1940.

He chaired the 18-man committee that produced the Fleming Report in 1944. It defined a public school as a member of the Governing Bodies Association or the Headmasters' Conference. Based on the recommendations of this report, the Education Act 1944 offered a new status to endowed grammar schools receiving a grant from central government. The direct grant grammar school would receive partial state funding in return for taking between 25% and 50% of its pupils from state primary schools. Members of the HMC accounted for 58 of the 178 direct grant schools, of which the vast majority were day schools. On average, nearly half of their places were funded by the state. A few local students were admitted to public schools, but that experiment petered out.

== Death ==
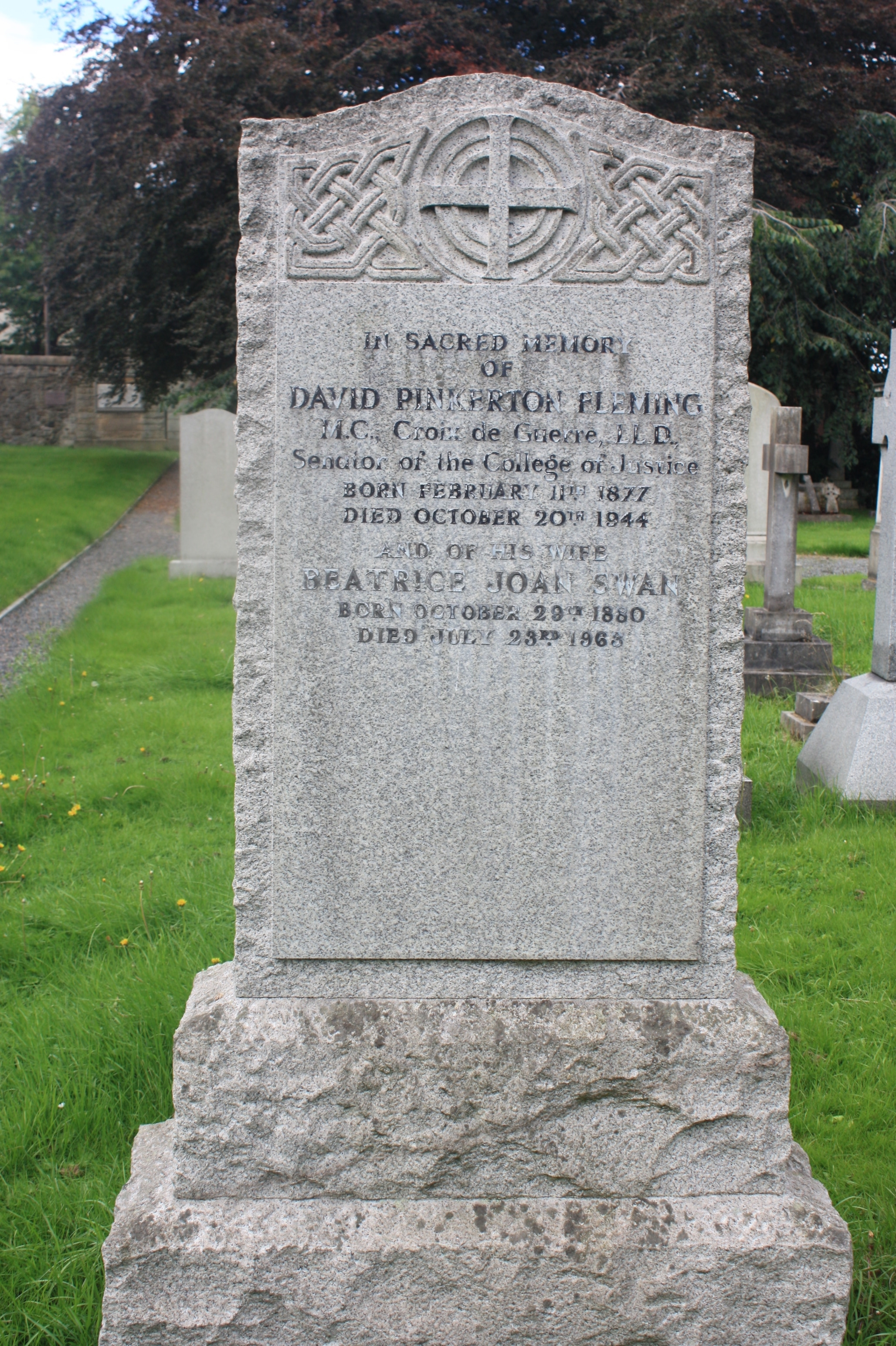
Fleming's grave in Dean Cemetery

He died at home, 19 Drumsheugh Gardens in Edinburgh's West End (now demolished) and is buried with his wife in the south-west corner of the north section in Dean Cemetery in Edinburgh, next to Arthur Henry Havens Sinclair.

== Family ==
He married Beatrice Joan Swan (1880-1965) in North Berwick on 4 September 1913.

Parliament of the United Kingdom
Preceded by William Martin	Member of Parliament for Dunbartonshire; 1924 – 1926	Succeeded by John Thom
Legal offices
Preceded by William Watson	Solicitor General for Scotland; 1922 – 1923	Succeeded by Frederick Thomson
Preceded by John Charles Fenton	Solicitor General for Scotland; 1924 – 1926	Succeeded by Alexander MacRobert
