= Sir James Colquhoun, 3rd Baronet, of Luss =

Scottish politician

Sir James Colquhoun, 3rd Baronet, of Luss (28 September 1774 – 3 February 1836) was the Member of Parliament (MP) for Dumbartonshire from 1799 to 1806.

Colquhoun was a Scottish aristocratic major in 1799 when he married the writer Janet Sinclair. He did not support her religious zeal. He was the heir to an estate in Dunbartonshire. It has been proposed that Colquhoun and his wife were the basis for the characters of Rabina and George Colwan in Hogg's The Private Memoirs and Confessions of a Justified Sinner.

Parliament of Great Britain
Preceded by Alexander Telfer Smollett	Member of Parliament for Dumbartonshire; 1799–1800	Succeeded by Parliament of the United Kingdom
Parliament of the United Kingdom
Preceded by Parliament of Great Britain	Member of Parliament for Dumbartonshire; 1801–1806	Succeeded by Henry Glassford
Baronetage of Great Britain
Preceded by John Colquhoun	Baronet (of Luss); 1805–1836	Succeeded by James Colquhoun
