= 1941 Dunbartonshire by-election =

UK parliamentary by-election

The 1941 Dunbartonshire by-election was held on 27 February 1941. The by-election was held due to the appointment as sheriff substitute of the incumbent Labour MP, Thomas Cassells. It was won by the Labour candidate Adam McKinlay.

Because of the wartime truce his only opponent was Malcolm MacEwen, a Communist, who had a relatively strong vote, possibly because the constituency did include the Vale of Leven, a "little Moscow". It took place before the German invasion of the Soviet Union, when the Communist Party changed its line.

The Scottish National Party had intended to stand a candidate - Robert MacEwen, the brother of Malcolm. However, he was serving in the Army at the time, and was not given permission by the military authorities to stand as a candidate; there was a dispute as to whether he had submitted his request in time and questions were raised in Parliament as to whether it had been delayed.

Dunbartonshire by-election, 1941
Party	Candidate	Votes	%	±%
Labour	Adam McKinlay	21,900	85.0	+36.9
Communist	Malcolm MacEwen	3,862	15.0	New
Majority		18,038	70.0	+67.6
Turnout		25,762	38.7	−29.9
Labour hold		Swing		
