= Shah Muhammad Sulaiman =

10th Chief Justice of the Allahabad High Court

The Right Honourable Sir Shah Muhammad Sulaiman PC

Judge of Federal Court of India
- In office 1 October 1937 – 12 March 1941
- Appointed by: George VI

10th Chief Justice of Allahabad High Court
- In office 16 March 1932 – 30 September 1937
- Appointed by: George V
- Preceded by: Grimwood Mears
- Succeeded by: John Gibb Thom

Judge of Allahabad High Court
- In office April 1923 – 15 March 1932
- Appointed by: George V

Vice Chancellor of Aligarh Muslim University
- In office 1938–1941

Personal details
- Born: 3 February 1886 Jaunpur district, United Provinces, British India
- Died: 12 March 1941 (aged 55)
- Relatives: Begum Akhtar Sulaiman (daughter-in-law); Riz Ahmed
- Education: Allahabad University; Christ's College, Cambridge, University of Cambridge; University of Dublin

Sir Shah Muhammad Sulaiman PC (3 February 1886 – 12 March 1941) (popularly known as Sir Shah Sulaiman or Sir Sulaiman) was the Chief Justice of the Allahabad High Court from 16 March 1932 to 30 September 1937 and was the first Indian and one of the youngest to hold the post. Sulaiman was the Vice Chancellor of Aligarh Muslim University from 1938 to 1941.

== Early life ==
He was born into a distinguished family of lawyers and scientists of Waleedpur village in Jaunpur District, Uttar Pradesh. One of his ancestors was Mulla Mahmud Jaunpuri (d.1652), who was the foremost philosopher and physicist of Shah Jahan's time, a debater of issues in Shiraz with Mir Damad, and the author of a much valued commentary, Shams al-Bazigha. His father Muhammad Usman was a leading member of the Jaunpur Bar. He had three brothers (Shah Mohammed Sifiyan, Shah Mohammed Salman, and Shah Mohammed Habib) and one sister (Shah Habib).

Sulaiman married Lady Fatima Sulaiman and had three sons and one daughter; Shah Mehmood Sulaiman, Shah Ahmed Sulaiman (husband of Begum Akhtar Sulaiman and father of Shahida Jamil, the first female Pakistan Federal Minister of Law), Shah Hamid Sulaiman and Salma Akhter.

Sulaiman graduated from Allahabad University in 1906 and topped the list. He was awarded the Provincial Government Scholarship to study abroad. He was educated at Christ's College, Cambridge and obtained Mathematical Tripos in (1909) and Law Tripos in 1910. He represented Cambridge University in the annual Varsity chess match against Oxford University in 1910 and drew his game (Cambridge won by 4½ to 2½). He was also awarded LLD by the University of Dublin (Ireland) in 1910.

== Legal career ==
Sulaiman returned to India in 1911 and started his legal practice as a junior to his father in Jaunpur. In 1912, he shifted to Allahabad to practice in the High Court.

The Rani of Sherkort's case, the Bamrauli case, the Dharampur case and the Bhilwal case, were his early legal triumphs. He impressed the English Chief Justice of Allahabad High Court so much that he was offered a seat on the Bench at an early age of 34.

Sulaiman acted as Chief Justice of the Allahabad High Court when he was 43. He was knighted in the 1929 King's Birthday Honours, becoming Sir Muhammad Sulaiman. At the age of 46 he was made the permanent Chief Justice of the Allahabad High Court on 16 March 1932. Five years later he was elevated to the Federal Court which was a record in the British Commonwealth at the time.

As Chief Justice of the Allahabad High Court, he handed down the final judgement in the Meerut Conspiracy Case at the appellate stage (S.H. Jhabwala And Ors. vs Emperor decided on 3 August 1933).

Sir Tej Bahadur Sapru said of him:

Nature had endowed him with gifts of an extraordinary character. Possessed of a penetrative intellect, a mind which could dissect and analyse things as very few other minds could, a power of expression and exposition, he did not take much time on the Bench before he made everyone feel that we had got a Judge of unusual ability and unusual gifts. . . He earned the respect of everyone for his depth of learning, for his sweep of mind and for the promptness of his decisions.

== Contribution to education ==
Sulaiman distinguished himself in diverse fields of human activity and aspects of learning. He was an educationist who is interested in the administration and advancement of several educational institutions, in which, he left distinctive marks.

He was founder president of several educational institutions and members of the Courts and Executive Councils of Allahabad and Aligarh Muslim University for a number of years, as President of the United Councils of Allahabad and Aligarh Muslim University for a number of years. He became President of the United Provinces Educational Conference at Badaon in 1924.

In 1928 he presided over the All-India Muhammadan Educational Conference at Ajmer and in his address he advocated a revolutionary and progressive change in the educational system by stressing the practical, technical and vocational sides of education.

He delivered convocation addresses at the Universities of Dacca, Aligarh, Hyderabad and Agra. Sulaiman was elected Vice-Chancellor of the Aligarh Muslim University where he introduced several beneficial reforms and laid down policies of far reaching importance, which extricated the university out of its financial and administrative crisis. He gave an impetus to education of women in the university and introduced Urdu as an independent subject in B.A. classes. He improved the finances of the university, helped execution of schemes concerning water works and the technological institutes. His dynamic leadership infused a healthy spirit of competition among the students in beneficial spheres of educational activity, which enabled the Aligarh Muslim University to compete successfully in the All-India Competitive Examinations in larger numbers. He made the university a centre of higher scientific research.

Sulaiman was also the president of the Anglo-Arabic College of Delhi for a number of years.

== Literary contributions ==
Sulaiman had a keen sense for poetry and presided over a number of All-India poetical symposiums (mushairas). He edited and wrote an enlightened introduction to the Alame-e-Khiyal, the immortal Masnavi of Shauq Qidwai.

After his death, the Nobel Laureate C.V. Raman wrote "As chief justice of the High Court at Allahabad for several years and as vice-chancellor of the Aligarh Muslim University over a considerable period, Sir Shah Sulaiman was a well-known public figure in India. During the last few years of his life he held the distinguished position of one of the three judges of the newly established Federal Court at Delhi. The news of his death early this year at the age of fifty-five came as an unpleasant surprise to his many friends and admirers, and elicited numerous well-merited tributes to his personality and career."

== Legacy ==
The Sir Shah Sulaiman Hall of Aligarh Muslim University is named after him.

He was buried at Nizamuddin Dargah by the side of Amir Khusrow.

Sir Shah Sulaiman Road, named after him, is a large road in Karachi that runs from the East wall of National Stadium, Karachi up to Government College for Men Nazimabad.
