= Joseph Fisher (Australian politician) =

Australian politician

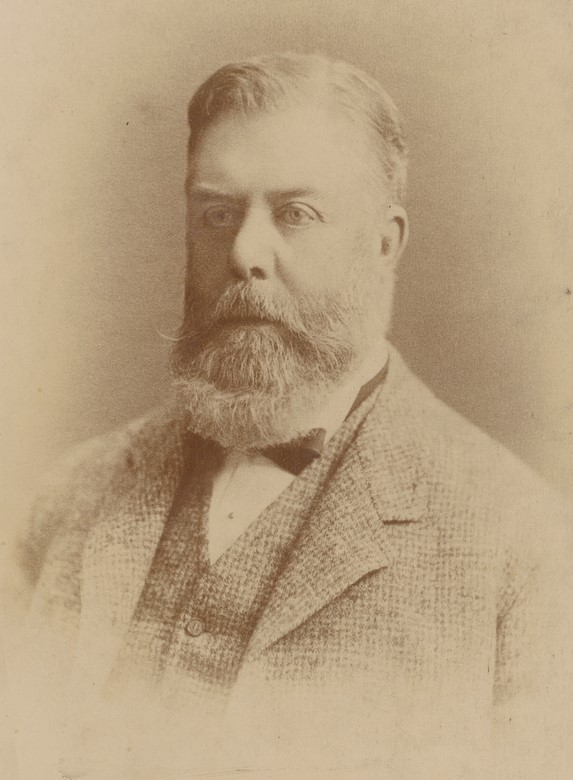

Joseph Fisher (14 September 1834 – 26 September 1907) was a South Australian politician and newspaper proprietor born in Brighouse, Yorkshire.

== Early Days ==
He left for Adelaide with his parents in the Prestonjee Bonanjee and arrived on 4 October 1838. His father, Joshua Fisher (died 1841), opened a grocery store at the corner of Hindley and Morphett Streets. Joseph was educated at the Oddfellows School where James Wardlaw Disher (1819 – 1901) was Classics master. (Disher and his brother-in-law Sir William Milne were later to take over the wine shop of Patrick Auld.)

In 1840 he started work as a clerk in the Tavistock Street office of the merchant Anthony Forster, who, on the death of Fisher's father in 1841 became his guardian.

== Newspapers ==
In 1848 Forster bought a half share of John Stephens' (died November 1850) newspapers The South Australian Register and The Observer, and gave Fisher a job in the newspaper's office. In those days every employee was involved in other aspects of getting the newspaper out. For Fisher that meant working the press, folding and bundling the papers as well as keeping the books. After three months Forster took no part in the day-to-day business of the paper. In May 1853 (after a year in the goldfields) Fisher became part-owner and business manager.

The Register was, under Stephens, a crusading paper, with a campaign against some injustice almost every week. This won respect for the paper, but cost it advertisers.

On 30 September 1865 Fisher sold his share of the business to John Howard Clark.

== Other Business ==
Fisher then concentrated on his activity as Adelaide agent of several businesses, notably that of John Ridley.

Fisher was director of the Bank of Adelaide for around 20 years, a director of the South Australian Gas Company and a director of the South Australian Company.

Fisher was part-owner of the clipper Hesperus and had shares in two large sheep stations.

Fisher was chairman of the Port Adelaide Dry Dock Company. and a director of Adelaide Marine and Fire Assurance.

Fisher was a director of The Mortgage Company of S. A. Ltd. which went into receivership in 1905.

== Other interests ==
For nearly 25 years Fisher was vice-president of the South Australian Cricketing Association and trustee of the Sturt Cricket Club

Fisher was known as a philanthropist, donating large sums to charitable and cultural organizations. This included £500 for the National Art Gallery and £1000 to the University of Adelaide, though these may have partly motivated by a need to avoid inheritance tax.

Fisher was an enthusiastic gardener and loved his roses and trees at his home 'Woodfield' at Fullarton. He renovated his home and filled it with local art. Part of the house behind Joseph Fisher is two storey with a tower above the central entrance. An attached single-storey residence with a return verandah stands to the east of this. The attractive gardens have rose beds, established trees and lawns lining the curved driveway.

== Politics ==
Joseph Fisher was elected to the South Australian House of Assembly for the district of Sturt from April 1868 to March 1870.

Fisher was elected to the South Australian Legislative Council in 1873 and held his seat until 1881. He was a man of unyielding principles – the obituary in The Register said "... in his earlier political career he expressed himself as sternly opposed to many of the political ideals which have since found favour in certain quarters and refused to shirk what he deemed to be his duties and responsibilities to retain his seat. He was at all times plain spoken and was not the man to make compromises of principle for the sake of securing any private advantage." This may have referred to his opposition in 1880 to a parliamentary bill, which he labelled as "Un-Christian", to restrict freedoms of Chinese nationals. This opposition probably cost him his seat at the 1881 elections.

== Private life ==
Fisher married Anne Wood Farrar (died 21 April 1915) on 10 March 1857 Their children include:

- Henry Fisher (11 December 1857 – 2 December 1864) aged 7 years of diphtheria
- Francis Joseph Fisher (24 August 1859 – 20 December 1927), married Ella Matilda, the daughter of Melbourne merchant Robert Sellar; they had a home "Pine Hill" at Mount Lofty.
- Gertrude Fisher (15 October 1865 – 20 March 1952) married William Culross 12 November 1887
- Harold Fisher (13 May 1867 – 7 July 1929) married Alice Russell Maude Smyth on 7 May 1890

For all their married life they lived in "Woodfield" at what is now 78 Fisher Street Fullarton. The original house was built around 1853 by J. C. Verco and P. Santo, schoolmates from J. L. Young's Adelaide Educational Institution, both of whom were to become South Australian parliamentarians. He bought it at the time of his marriage in 1857 and extended it significantly in 1883. A prominent feature is a square three-storey tower from which Fisher could watch shipping movements.

In his last twenty years Fisher suffered from gout and diabetes. His death at home, after a bout of influenza, was reported in the major newspapers. Curiously there was no death notice and his cremation was only reported after the event.
