= Adam McKinlay =

Scottish politician (1887–1950)

Adam Storey McKinlay (27 December 1887 – 17 March 1950) was a Scottish Labour Party politician. He was a Member of Parliament (MP) from 1929 to 1931, and from 1941 to 1950.

McKinlay was born in Govan, Glasgow in December 1887 to Hugh McKinlay and Lizzie Storey.

At the 1929 general election, McKinlay was elected as MP for Glasgow Partick. He was defeated in 1931 and was unsuccessful when he stood again in 1935. He also stood unsuccessfully in the 1935 Perth by-election. He returned to the House of Commons when he won a by-election in on 27 February 1941 for the Dunbartonshire constituency. He was re-elected in 1945 and when that constituency was abolished at the 1950 general election, he was returned for the new West Dunbartonshire constituency, holding that seat until his death the following month. McKinlay died in Anniesland, Glasgow from coronary artery thrombosis at the age of 62.

Parliament of the United Kingdom
| Preceded by George Broun-Lindsay | Member of Parliament for Glasgow Partick; 1929 – 1931 | Succeeded by Charles MacAndrew |
| Preceded by Thomas Cassells | Member of Parliament for Dunbartonshire; 1941–1950 | Constituency abolished |
| New constituency | Member of Parliament for West Dunbartonshire; 1950–1950 | Succeeded by Tom Steele |
