= Hugh Pearman (architecture critic) =

- Born: 1955
- Occupations: Journalist, author
- Awards: Member of the Order of the British Empire

Hugh Geoffrey Pearman MBE (born 29 May 1955) is a London-based architectural writer, editor and consultant.

He is the author of several books including Contemporary World Architecture (Phaidon), Airports: A Century of Architecture (Laurence King and Abrams), Equilibrium: the work of Nicholas Grimshaw and Partners (Phaidon), Cullinan Studio in the 21st Century (Lund Humphries), and in 2023 About Architecture: An Essential Guide in 55 Buildings (Yale University Press)

== Early life and education ==
Pearman was born in Tunbridge Wells, Kent, and studied at the Skinners School in Royal Tunbridge Wells and St Chad's College, Durham University. His degree is in English Language and Literature. In December 2020 he appeared on Christmas University Challenge as a member of the Durham alumni team.

== Career ==
He edited the RIBA Journal from September 2006, retiring in December 2020. He was architecture and design critic of The Sunday Times for 30 years, from 1986 to early 2016. Other newspapers he has contributed to include the Guardian, The Observer, the Wall Street Journal, and The New York Times. Other magazines he has written for include Newsweek, Art Quarterly, Royal Academy Magazine, Crafts, Architectural Record, the Architectural Review, and World of Interiors, among many other publications. He has served on Arts Council England's architecture advisory group, and was one of the instigators of The RIBA Stirling Prize for Architecture in 1996. From 2000 to 2004 he chaired the "Art for Architecture" initiative at the Royal Society of Arts. He was made an Honorary Fellow of the Royal Institute of British Architects in 2001. He was visiting professor in Architecture at the Royal College of Art, London, during 2015. He was an honorary vice-president of London's Architectural Association, 2014-2016.

Pearman was appointed Member of the Order of the British Empire (MBE) in the 2019 Birthday Honours for services to architecture.
