= Malcolm MacEwen =

Scottish journalist and environmentalist (1911–1996)

Malcolm MacEwen (24 December 1911 – 11 May 1996) was a Scottish conservationist and communist activist.

== Life ==
Born in Inverness, MacEwen was the son of Alexander MacEwen, first leader of the Scottish National Party. He was educated at Rossall School in England, as his father hoped he would not acquire a strong Scottish accent. He studied forestry at the University of Aberdeen, during which time he lost a leg in a car accident. He also joined the Labour Party, and served as a councillor in Banff for a time. However, he decided to requalify as a lawyer, studying at the University of Edinburgh, where he joined the Communist Party of Great Britain (CPGB). Soon after this graduation he found work as a lawyer for the Scottish Daily Worker, a short-lived edition of the communist Daily Worker newspaper.

When the Scottish Daily Worker ceased publication, MacEwen began working directly for the CPGB as the party's North East England District Secretary. He stood for the party in the 1941 Dunbartonshire by-election, the party's last contest before joining a political truce during World War II; he took 15.0% of the votes cast in a two-way race.

MacEwen's wife died of diabetes-related complications in the 1940s, their daughter was severely disabled and died in 1967. By this time, he was based in London, again working as a lawyer for the Daily Worker, then later became the paper's foreign correspondent, and as its House of Commons correspondent. He stood again for the party in Glasgow Shettleston at the 1950 general election, taking just 4.1% of the vote.

MacEwen grew disillusioned with the CPGB, and resigned after the Soviet invasion of Hungary in 1956. His position at the Daily Worker was untenable, and he instead found work at the Architects' Journal. In 1964 he became editor of the Royal Institute of British Architects' publication, RIBA Journal. There, inspired by his second wife, Ann MacEwen, he opposed prioritising traffic needs in city planning, and called for increased public input into architectural decisions. He articulated his views in the 1974 book, Crisis in Architecture. MacEwen stepped down as editor of RIBA Journal in 1971, and then served for a while as RIBA's Director of Public Affairs.

MacEwen and Ann retired to Wootton Courtenay in the Exmoor National Park, where they jointly wrote National Parks - Cosmetics or Conservation? in support of the role of national parks in conservation. He also published an autobiography, The Greening of a Red. He was cared for by Ann during a lengthy period of poor health in the 1990s, ending with his death in 1996.

== Legacy ==
The RIBA Journal MacEwen Awards, named after Malcolm and Ann MacEwen, are given annually to recognise "architecture for the common good".

The MacEwen Essay Competition was launched by The Exmoor Society to mark its Diamond Jubilee in 2018 and to honour the legacy of Malcolm and Ann MacEwen.

A monument to MacEwen is located in the wall of a sheepfold at Larkbarrow in Exmoor National Park.
