= Ann MacEwen =

- Born: Ann Radford; 15 August 1918; Sutton, Surrey
- Died: 20 August 2008 (aged 90); Whetstone
- Occupations: Architect and town planner
- Spouse: Malcolm MacEwen

Ann MacEwen née Radford also known as Ann Maitland (15 August 1918 – 20 August 2008) was a British architect and town planner - known for championing National Parks and resisting the car's domination of planning in the UK.

== Life ==
MacEwen was born in 1918 in Sutton, Surrey. Her parents Muriel Ann, née Lloyd and Maitland Radford were both doctors. Her father was a medical officer for St Pancras while her mother also worked in public health. Two of her grandparents were the writers Dollie Radford and Ernest Radford. She went to Howell's School in Denbigh and was brought up in the socialist mold. She joined the Architectural Association School of Architecture where she joined the student rebellion that sought to modernise the organisation. Her modernist credentials were demonstrated when she worked on the Architecture student project known as Tomorrow Town. She married John Wheeler on 21 December 1940 who had been a member of the Tomorrow Town team but who, by then, had joined the RAF. Her other contemporaries were Elizabeth Chesterton, Anthony Cox and Richard Llewellyn Davies.

MacEwen believed strongly in the benefits of town planning and architecture although she thought that politics would be required to fully achieve them. Both she and her husband joined the Communist Party of Great Britain, although her husband had become a pilot. They had two children before her husband was killed whist testing a plane at high altitude. At the end of the second world war she was a widow with two children who was working for Judith Ledeboer. Before her husband died they had been living communally with her brother and his wife.

In 1946 she continued architecture planning working on plans for Hemel Hempstead under the leadership of Geoffrey Jellicoe. She married Malcolm MacEwen on 22 May 1947 who was a journalist at the Daily Worker. During the following pregnancy she took a diploma in town planning at the School of Planning and Regional Reconstruction which she completed before her third child was born in September 1948. The following year she was planning the post war reconstruction of Stepney and Poplar working for Percy Johnson Marshall and Arthur Ling at London County Council.

MacEwen insisted on working only a five-day week so that her three children would not be alone on Saturdays. The employment rules discriminated against this work pattern and she was denied full employment rights. This sexist approach changed and she was able to take a leasing role in planning north London which they intended to have community centres, nursery schools, medical facilities and parks. The new estates were built although the community ideals of the Architectural Association were lost in budgets.

There was an uprising in Hungary in 1956 and MacEwan and her husband were disappointed by Britain's communist party reaction to their plight. They failed to report the facts of Russia's aggression. The MacEwans resigned in protest.

MacEwen and Ann retired to Wootton Courtenay in the Exmoor National Park in 1968. She is known for her books "National Parks: Conservation or Cosmetics?" and "Greenprints for the Countryside?" which she wrote with her husband and supplied a focus for work on Britain's National Parks. Malcolm was cared for by Ann during a lengthy period of poor health during the 1990s, ending with his death in 1996. MacEwen died in a nursing home in 2008.
