= William Martin (Scottish politician) =

William Henry Porteous Martin (15 June 1886 – 9 January 1939) was a Scottish Labour Party politician. He was member of parliament (MP) for Dunbartonshire from 1923 to 1924.

Martin was unsuccessful candidate in the Dunbartonshire constituency at the 1918 and 1922 general elections, losing only narrowly in the latter contest, before winning the seat at the 1923 general election. He was defeated in 1924 by the Unionist candidate David Fleming, and when Fleming resigned from the House of Commons in 1926, Martin was the Labour candidate at the resulting by-election. The seat was held by the Unionists.

At the 1929 general election, Martin stood in Aberdeen South, a Unionist safe seat where he lost by a wide margin. His last electoral contest was in Glasgow Central at the 1931 election, where he was defeated by almost two to one.

Parliament of the United Kingdom
| Preceded by Sir William Raeburn | Member of Parliament for Dunbartonshire; 1923 – 1924 | Succeeded by David Fleming |
