= Dunbartonshire (UK Parliament constituency) =

Parliamentary constituency in the United Kingdom, 1801–1950

- Former county constituency for the House of Commons
- Subdivision: County of Dumbarton

1708–1950
- Seats: One
- Replaced by: East Dunbartonshire; West Dunbartonshire

Dunbartonshire was a county constituency of the House of Commons of Great Britain (at Westminster) from 1708 to 1801 and of the House of Commons of the Parliament of the United Kingdom (also Westminster) from 1801 to 1950.

== Creation ==
The British parliamentary constituency was created in 1708 following the Acts of Union, 1707 and replaced the former Parliament of Scotland shire constituency of Dunbartonshire .

== History ==
The constituency elected one Member of Parliament (MP) by the first-past-the-post system until the seat was split in 1950. It elected one Member of Parliament (MP) using the first-past-the-post voting system.

== Boundaries ==
The constituency was created to cover the county of Dumbarton (later Dunbarton) minus any parliamentary burgh or part thereof within the county. From 1832 to 1918, however, under the Representation of the People (Scotland) Act 1832, the Representation of the People (Scotland) Act 1868 and the Redistribution of Seats Act 1885, the boundaries of counties and burghs for purposes of parliamentary representation were not necessarily those for other purposes.

The Representation of the People Act 1918 brought constituency boundaries generally into alignment with local government boundaries established under the Local Government (Scotland) Act 1889 and subsequent related legislation, but there were later changes to local government boundaries which were not reflected in new constituency boundaries until 1950, the same year that the Dunbartonshire constituency was abolished, under the House of Commons (Redistribution of Seats) Act 1949.

For the period 1832 to 1918 boundary details below are nominal, and for the period 1918 to 1950 they are those applicable in 1918.

For the 1708 (first) general election and every subsequent election of the Parliament of Great Britain the Dumbartonshire constituency consisted of the county of Dumbarton minus the burgh of Dumbarton, which was a component of the Clyde Burghs constituency.

In 1801 the Parliament of Great Britain was merged with the Parliament of Ireland to form the Parliament of the United Kingdom. The Dumbartonshire constituency retained its boundaries as a constituency of the Parliament of Great Britain for the 1802 (first) general election of the new Parliament of the United Kingdom and for the general elections of 1806, 1807, 1812, 1818, 1820, 1826, 1830 and 1831.

Nominally, the constituency had the same boundaries for the 1832 general election, but the burgh of Dumbarton was now a component of Kilmarnock Burghs. 1832 boundaries were used also in all general elections up to December 1910.

For the 1918 general election the constituency was defined as covering the county of Dunbarton minus the burghs of Dumbarton and Clydebank, which comprised Dumbarton Burghs. 1918 boundaries were used also in all general elections up to 1945.

For the 1950 general election new constituency boundaries divided the county of Dunbarton between the East Dunbartonshire and West Dunbartonshire constituencies, both entirely within the county.

== Members of Parliament ==
=== MPs 1708–1832 ===
Election	Member	Party
1708	John Campbell	
1710	John Campbell	
1713	John Campbell	
1715	John Campbell	
1722	Mungo Haldane	
1725	John Campbell	
1727	John Campbell, later Duke of Argyll	Whig
1734	John Campbell, later Duke of Argyll	Whig
1741	John Campbell, later Duke of Argyll	Whig
1747	John Campbell, later Duke of Argyll	Whig
1754	John Campbell, later Duke of Argyll	Whig
1761	Archibald Edmonstone	Tory
1768	Archibald Edmonstone	Tory
1774	Archibald Edmonstone	Tory
1780	Lord Frederick Campbell	
1781	George Elphinstone	
1784	George Elphinstone	
1790	Archibald Edmonstone	Tory
1796	William Bontine	
1797	Alexander Smollett	
1799	Sir James Colquhoun, 3rd Bt	
1801	Sir James Colquhoun, 3rd Bt	
1802	Sir James Colquhoun, 3rd Bt	
1806	Henry Glassford	
1806	Charles Edmonstone	Tory
1807	Henry Glassford	
1810	Archibald Campbell-Colquhoun	
1812	Archibald Campbell-Colquhoun	
1818	Archibald Campbell-Colquhoun	
1820	Archibald Campbell-Colquhoun	
1821	John Buchanan	
1826	John Campbell	Tory
1830	Lord Montagu Graham	Tory
1831	Lord Montagu Graham	Tory

=== MPs 1832–1950 ===
Election	Member	Party
1832	John Campbell Colquhoun	Whig
1835	Alexander Dennistoun	Whig
1837	Sir James Colquhoun, 4th Bt	Whig
1841	Alexander Smollett	Conservative
1847	Alexander Smollett	Conservative
1852	Alexander Smollett	Conservative
1857	Alexander Smollett	Conservative
1859	Patrick Smollett	Conservative
1865	Patrick Smollett	Conservative
1868	Archibald Orr-Ewing	Conservative
1874	Archibald Orr-Ewing	Conservative
1880	Archibald Orr-Ewing	Conservative
1885	Archibald Orr-Ewing	Conservative
1886	Archibald Orr-Ewing	Conservative
1892	John Sinclair	Liberal
1895	Alexander Wylie	Conservative
1900	Alexander Wylie	Conservative
1906	J. D. White	Liberal
1910 (January)	J. D. White	Liberal
1910 (December)	Arthur Acland Allen	Liberal
1918	William Raeburn	Coalition Conservative
1922	William Raeburn	Conservative
1923	William Martin	Labour
1924	David Fleming	Conservative
1926 by-election	John Thom	Conservative
1929	Willie Brooke	Labour
1931	John Thom	Conservative
1932 by-election	Archibald Cochrane	Conservative
1935	Archibald Cochrane	Conservative
1936 by-election	Thomas Cassells	Labour
1941 by-election	Adam McKinlay	Labour
1945	Adam McKinlay	Labour
1950	constituency divided: see East Dunbartonshire and West Dunbartonshire	

== Election results ==
=== Elections in the 1830s ===
General election 1830: Dunbartonshire
Party	Candidate	Votes	%
Tory	Montagu Graham	31	50.8
Whig	John Campbell Colquhoun	30	49.2
Majority		1	1.6
Turnout		61	84.7
Registered electors		72	
Tory hold			

General election 1831: Dunbartonshire
Party	Candidate	Votes	%	±%
Tory	Montagu Graham	28	54.9	+4.1
Whig	John Campbell Colquhoun	23	45.1	−4.1
Majority		5	9.8	+8.2
Turnout		51	70.8	−13.9
Registered electors		72		
Tory hold		Swing	+4.1	

General election 1832: Dunbartonshire
Party	Candidate	Votes	%	±%
Whig	John Campbell Colquhoun	422	52.9	+3.7
Whig	James Colquhoun	375	47.1	N/A
Majority		47	5.8	N/A
Turnout		797	86.0	+15.2
Registered electors		927		
Whig gain from Tory		Swing	+3.7	

General election 1835: Dunbartonshire
Party	Candidate	Votes	%	±%
Whig	Alexander Dennistoun	436	52.2	N/A
Conservative	Alexander Smollett	399	47.8	New
Majority		37	4.4	−1.4
Turnout		835	83.6	−2.4
Registered electors		999		
Whig hold		Swing	N/A	

General election 1837: Dunbartonshire
Party	Candidate	Votes	%	±%
Whig	James Colquhoun	452	52.4	+0.2
Conservative	Alexander Smollett	411	47.6	−0.2
Majority		41	4.8	+0.4
Turnout		863	75.8	−7.8
Registered electors		1,139		
Whig hold		Swing	+0.2	

=== Elections in the 1840s ===
General election 1841: Dunbartonshire
Party	Candidate	Votes	%	±%
Conservative	Alexander Smollett	Unopposed		
Registered electors		1,212		
Conservative gain from Whig				

General election 1847: Dunbartonshire
Party	Candidate	Votes	%	±%
Conservative	Alexander Smollett	536	64.6	N/A
Whig	Thomas Campbell Robertson	294	35.4	New
Majority		242	29.2	N/A
Turnout		830	64.4	N/A
Registered electors		1,288		
Conservative hold		Swing	N/A	

=== Elections in the 1850s ===
General election 1852: Dunbartonshire
Party	Candidate	Votes	%	±%
Conservative	Alexander Smollett	Unopposed		
Registered electors		1,314		
Conservative hold				

General election 1857: Dunbartonshire
Party	Candidate	Votes	%	±%
Conservative	Alexander Smollett	Unopposed		
Registered electors		1,348		
Conservative hold				

General election 1859: Dunbartonshire
Party	Candidate	Votes	%	±%
Conservative	Patrick Smollett	490	55.1	N/A
Liberal	William Cunninghame Bontine	399	44.9	New
Majority		91	10.2	N/A
Turnout		889	64.5	N/A
Registered electors		1,379		
Conservative hold		Swing	N/A	

=== Elections in the 1860s ===
General election 1865: Dunbartonshire
Party	Candidate	Votes	%	±%
Conservative	Patrick Smollett	574	50.0	−5.1
Liberal	James Stirling	574	50.0	+5.1
Majority		0	0.0	−10.2
Turnout		1,148	71.9	+7.4
Registered electors		1,597		
Conservative hold		Swing	−5.1	

A petition was lodged in this election, against Stirling, but was later withdrawn after he decided not to defend his claim to the seat, allowing Smollett to be declared duly elected.

General election 1868: Dunbartonshire
Party	Candidate	Votes	%	±%
Conservative	Archibald Orr-Ewing	Unopposed		
Registered electors		2,156		
Conservative hold				

=== Elections in the 1870s ===
General election 1874: Dunbartonshire
Party	Candidate	Votes	%	±%
Conservative	Archibald Orr-Ewing	995	51.4	N/A
Liberal	John William Burns	942	48.6	New
Majority		53	2.8	N/A
Turnout		1,937	85.5	N/A
Registered electors		2,265		
Conservative hold		Swing	N/A	

=== Elections in the 1880s ===
General election 1880: Dunbartonshire
Party	Candidate	Votes	%	±%
Conservative	Archibald Orr-Ewing	1,333	50.2	−1.2
Liberal	John William Burns	1,324	49.8	+1.2
Majority		9	0.4	−2.4
Turnout		2,657	89.3	+3.8
Registered electors		2,976		
Conservative hold		Swing	−1.2	

General election 1885: Dunbartonshire
Party	Candidate	Votes	%	±%
Conservative	Archibald Orr-Ewing	4,514	50.9	+0.7
Liberal	Robert Reid	4,357	48.1	−0.7
Majority		157	1.8	+1.4
Turnout		8,871	88.2	−1.1
Registered electors		10,063		
Conservative hold		Swing	+0.7	

General election 1886: Dunbartonshire
Party	Candidate	Votes	%	±%
Conservative	Archibald Orr-Ewing	4,249	50.2	−0.7
Liberal	Ronald Munro Ferguson	4,217	49.8	+0.7
Majority		32	0.4	−1.4
Turnout		8,466	84.1	−4.1
Registered electors		10,063		
Conservative hold		Swing	-0.7	

=== Elections in the 1890s ===
General election 1892: Dunbartonshire
Party	Candidate	Votes	%	±%
Liberal	John Sinclair	5,249	51.4	+1.6
Conservative	Alexander Wylie	4,956	48.6	−1.6
Majority		293	2.8	N/A
Turnout		10,205	86.6	+2.5
Registered electors		11,789		
Liberal gain from Conservative		Swing	+1.6	

General election 1895: Dunbartonshire
Party	Candidate	Votes	%	±%
Conservative	Alexander Wylie	5,375	50.2	+1.6
Liberal	John Sinclair	5,342	49.8	−1.6
Majority		33	0.4	N/A
Turnout		10,717	87.2	+0.6
Registered electors		12,292		
Conservative gain from Liberal		Swing	+1.6	

=== Elections in the 1900s ===
General election 1900: Dunbartonshire
Party	Candidate	Votes	%	±%
Conservative	Alexander Wylie	6,083	53.0	+2.8
Liberal	P.R. Buchanan	5,393	47.0	−2.8
Majority		690	6.0	+5.6
Turnout		11,476	83.6	−3.6
Registered electors		13,731		
Conservative hold		Swing	+2.8	

General election 1906: Dunbartonshire
Party	Candidate	Votes	%	±%
Liberal	J. D. White	7,404	51.6	+4.6
Conservative	Henry Brock	6,937	48.4	−4.6
Majority		467	3.2	N/A
Turnout		14,341	87.8	+4.2
Registered electors		16,335		
Liberal gain from Conservative		Swing	+4.6	

=== Elections in the 1910s ===
General election January 1910: Dunbartonshire
Party	Candidate	Votes	%	±%
Liberal	J. D. White	8,640	53.2	+1.6
Conservative	Henry Brock	7,607	46.8	−1.6
Majority		1,033	6.4	+3.2
Turnout		16,247	88.3	+0.5
Liberal hold		Swing	+1.6	

A.A. Allen

General election December 1910: Dunbartonshire
Party	Candidate	Votes	%	±%
Liberal	Arthur Acland Allen	8,579	54.1	+0.9
Conservative	William T. Shaw	7,267	45.9	−0.9
Majority		1,312	8.2	+1.8
Turnout		15,846	84.5	−3.8
Liberal hold		Swing	+0.9	

General election 1918: Dunbartonshire
Party		Candidate	Votes	%	±%
C	Unionist	William Raeburn	12,765	55.8	+9.9
	Labour	William Martin	7,072	30.9	New
	Liberal	Arthur Acland Allen	3,048	13.3	−40.8
Majority			5,693	24.9	N/A
Turnout			22,885	66.8	−17.7
Registered electors			34,284		
	Unionist gain from Liberal		Swing	+25.4	
C indicates candidate endorsed by the coalition government.

=== Elections in the 1920s ===
General election 1922: Dunbartonshire
Party	Candidate	Votes	%	±%
Unionist	William Raeburn	13,407	50.4	−5.4
Labour	William Martin	13,216	49.6	+18.7
Majority		191	0.8	−24.1
Turnout		26,623	69.0	+2.2
Registered electors		38,559		
Unionist hold		Swing	−12.1	

General election 1923: Dunbartonshire
Party	Candidate	Votes	%	±%
Labour	William Martin	11,705	43.0	−6.6
Unionist	David Fleming	9,802	36.0	−14.4
Liberal	Stanley Holmes	5,726	21.0	New
Majority		1,903	7.0	N/A
Turnout		27,233	70.7	+1.7
Registered electors		38,539		
Labour gain from Unionist		Swing	+3.9	

General election 1924: Dunbartonshire
Party	Candidate	Votes	%	±%
Unionist	David Fleming	16,223	55.8	+19.8
Labour	William Martin	12,872	44.2	+1.2
Majority		3,351	11.6	N/A
Turnout		29,095	75.6	+4.9
Registered electors		38,469		
Unionist gain from Labour		Swing	+9.3	

1926 Dunbartonshire by-election
Party	Candidate	Votes	%	±%
Unionist	John Thom	12,680	48.0	−7.8
Labour	William Martin	11,610	43.9	−0.3
Liberal	William Reid	2,146	8.1	New
Majority		1,070	4.1	−7.5
Turnout		26,436	75.0	−0.6
Registered electors		35,239		
Unionist hold		Swing	−3.8	

General election 1929: Dunbartonshire
Party	Candidate	Votes	%	±%
Labour	Willie Brooke	18,153	45.7	+1.5
Unionist	John Thom	16,576	41.6	−14.2
Liberal	Thomas Maule Guthrie	5,071	12.7	N/A
Majority		1,577	4.1	N/A
Turnout		39,800	81.0	+5.4
Registered electors		49,113		
Labour gain from Unionist		Swing	+7.9	

=== Elections in the 1930s ===
General election 1931: Dunbartonshire
Party	Candidate	Votes	%	±%
Unionist	John Thom	28,762	63.6	+22.0
Labour	Willie Brooke	16,474	36.4	−9.3
Majority		12,288	27.2	N/A
Turnout		45,236	82.8	+1.8
Unionist gain from Labour		Swing	+15.6	

1932 Dunbartonshire by-election
Party	Candidate	Votes	%	±%
Unionist	Archibald Cochrane	16,749	43.5	−20.1
Labour	Tom Johnston	13,704	35.6	−0.8
National (Scotland)	Robert Gray	5,178	13.4	New
Communist	Hughie McIntyre	2,870	7.5	New
Majority		3,045	7.9	−19.3
Turnout		38,501		
Unionist hold		Swing		

General election 1935: Dunbartonshire
Party	Candidate	Votes	%	±%
Unionist	Archibald Cochrane	24,776	50.3	+6.8
Labour	Thomas Cassells	20,679	41.9	+6.3
SNP	Robert Gray	3,841	7.8	N/A
Majority		4,097	8.4	+0.5
Turnout		49,296	80.5	−2.3
Unionist hold		Swing	+0.2	

1936 Dunbartonshire by-election
Party	Candidate	Votes	%	±%
Labour	Thomas Cassells	20,187	48.1	+6.2
Unionist	Arthur Paterson Duffes	19,203	45.7	−4.6
SNP	Robert Gray	2,599	6.2	−1.6
Majority		984	2.4	N/A
Turnout		41,989	68.6	−11.9
Labour gain from Unionist		Swing	+5.4	

=== Elections in the 1940s ===
1941 Dunbartonshire by-election
Party	Candidate	Votes	%	±%
Labour	Adam McKinlay	21,900	85.0	+36.9
Communist	Malcolm MacEwen	3,862	15.0	New
Majority		18,038	70.0	+67.6
Turnout		25,762	38.7	−29.9
Labour hold		Swing		

General election 1945: Dunbartonshire
Party	Candidate	Votes	%	±%
Labour	Adam McKinlay	28,383	50.7	+8.8
Unionist	Robert Allan	27,636	49.3	−1.0
Majority		747	1.4	−7.0
Turnout		56,019	71.7	−8.8
Labour hold		Swing		

== Notes and references ==
- Leigh Rayment's Historical List of MPs – Constituencies beginning with "D" (part 4)
