= New London Architecture =

New London Architecture (NLA) is an independent information resource and discussion forum focused on London's built environment. Its audience are professionals, the public and politicians.

== Origins and purpose ==
NLA was founded in 2005 and its stated mission is "to bring people together to shape a better city".

== Activities ==
NLA delivers over 150 events per year, including a mixture of round table discussions, conferences, debates, talks, walking tours, and receptions. The organisation also publishes research, hosts rotating exhibitions, holds awards and organises international ideas competitions, such as "New Ideas for Housing" (2015). NLA's main publication is New London Quarterly. New London Quarterly is circulated to 5,000 leading people with an interest in London's built environment. Its galleries are open, free of charge, six days a week and receive over 10,000 visitors each month.

== New London Model ==
The NLA's permanent exhibition includes a 1:2000-scale interactive model of central London. The model is approximately 12.5 metres (41 ft) long and represents an area in excess of 85 square kilometres (33 sq mi) of London. It was improved and extended in 2015.
