= Alexander Smollett =

Scottish politician

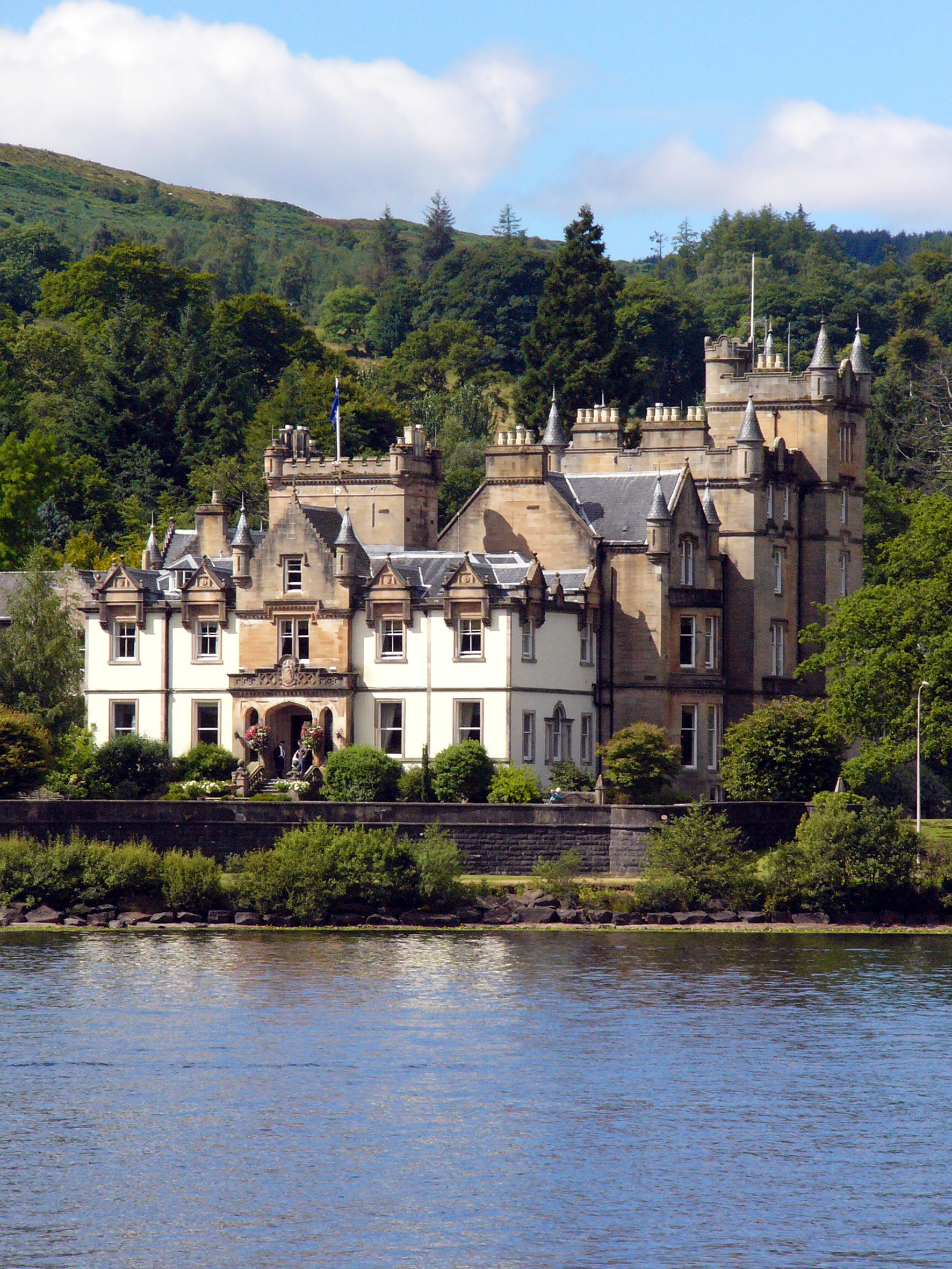
Cameron House, The Smollet's home on Loch Lomond

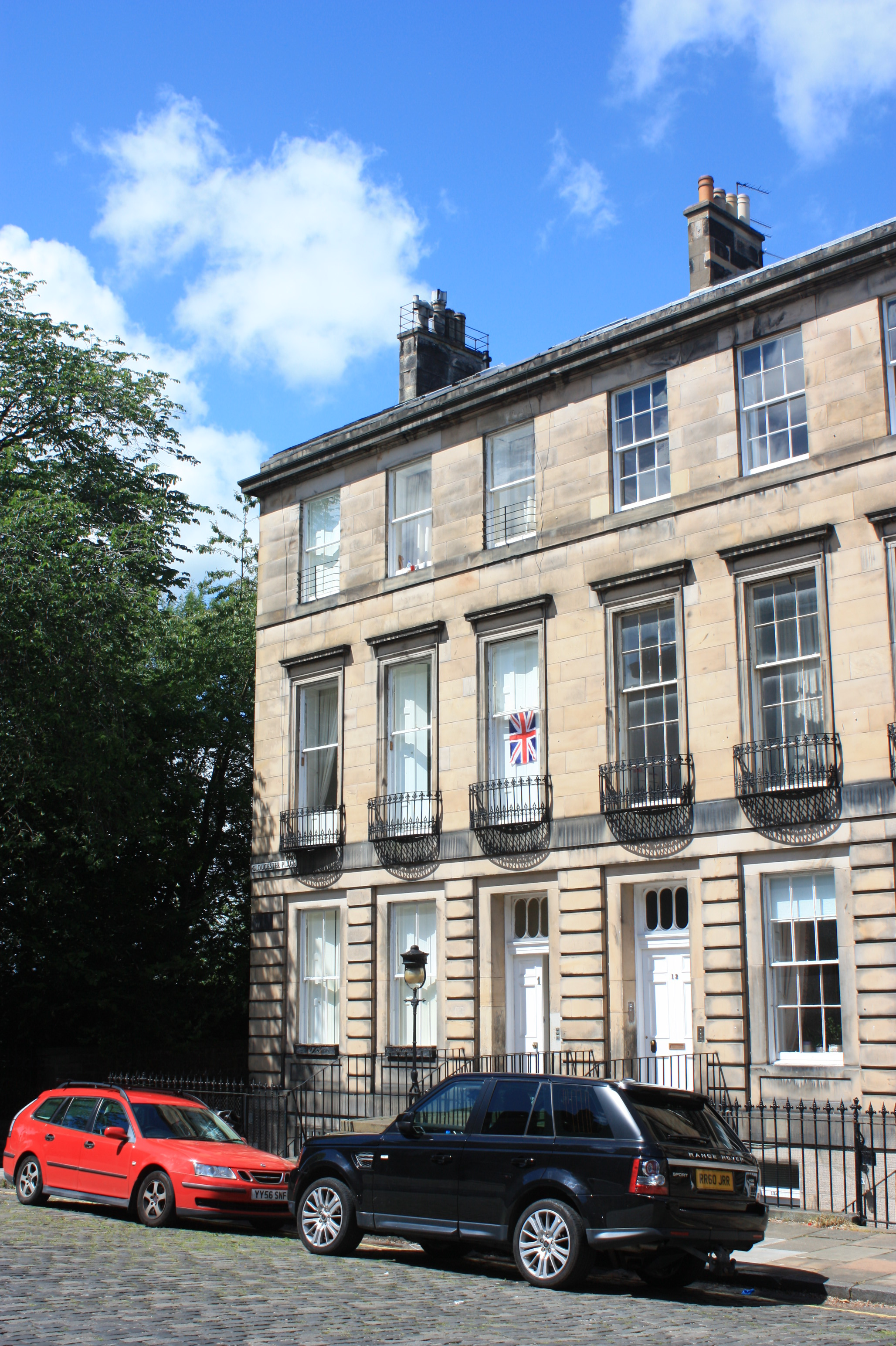
Smollet's home at 14 Gloucester Place, Edinburgh

Alexander Smollett (29 November 1801 – 25 February 1881) was a Scottish Conservative Party politician. He was a Member of Parliament (MP) for Dunbartonshire from 1841 to 1859.

== Life ==
He was born at Cameron House, Bonhill in Dunbartonshire on 29 November 1801. He was the son of Elizabeth Boyle, daughter of Patrick Boyle of Shewalton and Admiral John Rouett Smollett (1767–1842). He had four sisters and a brother, Patrick Boyle. His eldest sister Elizabeth married Charles Villiers Stuart, the younger brother of Lord Stuart of Decies.

He appears in 1827 as an advocate. In the 1830s he was working in Edinburgh as an advocate and living at 14 Gloucester Place in the Stockbridge area of the city.

In 1835 he is listed as a member of the Highland and Agriculture Society of Scotland.

In 1844 he appears on the committee of the Glasgow, Dunbarton and Loch Lomond Railway Company.

He on 25 February 1881, and was buried in the Smollett family mausoleum in Alexandria, Dumbartonshire.

Parliament of the United Kingdom
Preceded by Sir James Colquhoun, 4th Bt	Member of Parliament for Dunbartonshire; 1841 – 1859	Succeeded by Patrick Smollett
