= Alexander Dennistoun =

Scottish merchant, bank director, property developer and Member of Parliament (1790-1894)

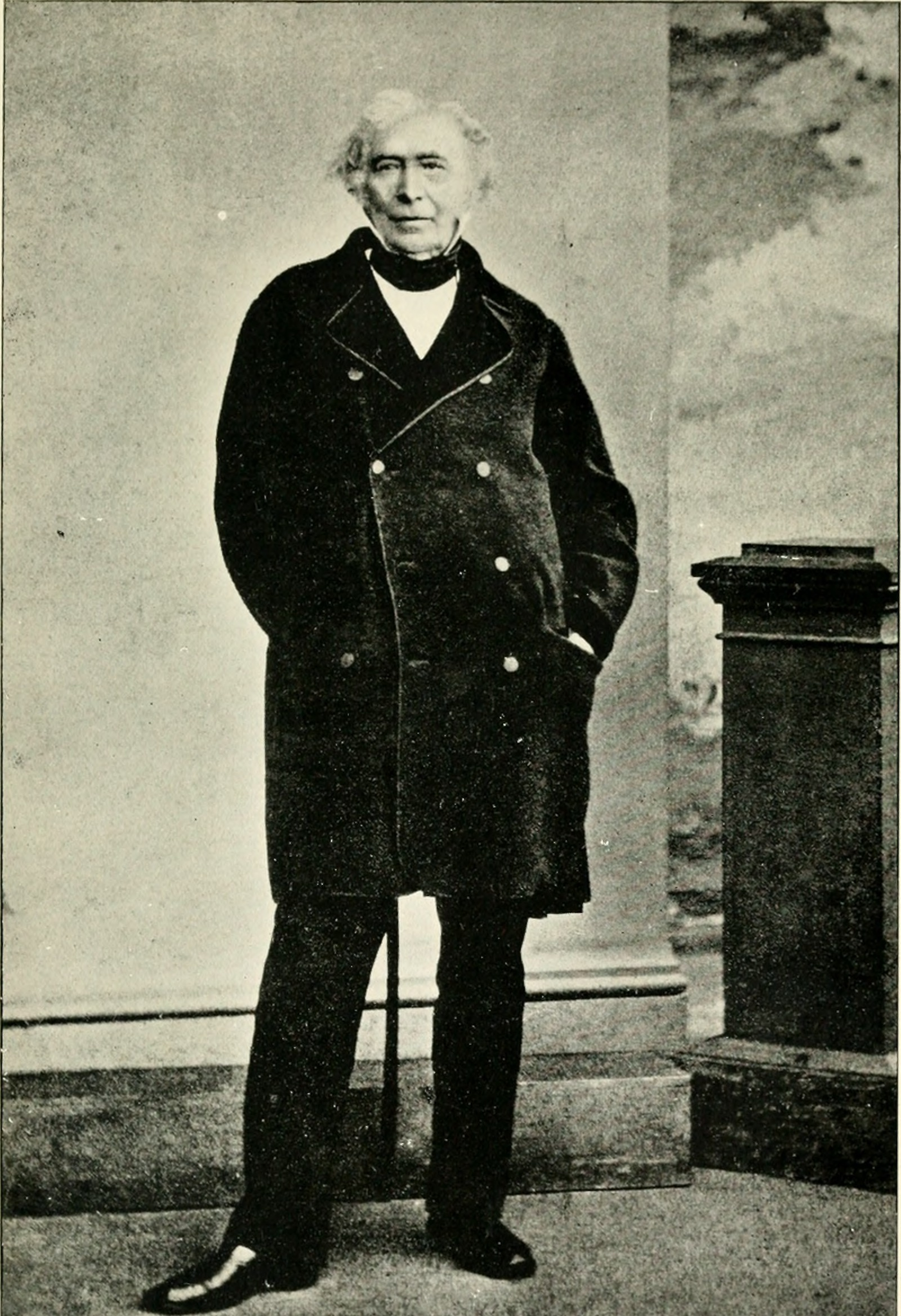
- Alexander Dennistoun

Member of Parliament for Dunbartonshire
- In office 1835–1837

Personal details
- Born: Alexander Dennistoun; August 14, 1790 Glasgow, Scotland
- Died: July 15, 1874 (aged 83) Lagarie, Gareloch, Scotland
- Occupation: Merchant, banker, property developer, politician
- Known for: Establishing the Glasgow residential area Dennistoun; MP for Dunbartonshire (1835–1837)

Alexander Dennistoun (also known as Alex Dennistoun; 1790–1874) was a Scottish merchant, bank director, property developer and, for two years, from 1835 to 1837, a Member of Parliament for Dunbartonshire. He was responsible for establishing the Glasgow residential area Dennistoun, named after him.

His brother, John Dennistoun, was Whig MP for Glasgow from 1837 to 1847.

== Biography ==
Alexander Dennistoun was born 14 August 1790 to James Dennistoun of Golf Hill (1752–1835), a very prosperous merchant and banker prominent in Glasgow society, and his wife Mary, daughter of William Finlay of The Moss, Stirlingshire (cousin of politician Kirkman Finlay).

Alexander Dennistoun's father James Dennistoun, together with his brother Alexander, established J. & A. Dennistoun, a trading company active across the Atlantic, with interests in tobacco, cotton, and branches in Liverpool, New Orleans, Havre de Grace, and subsequently at New York, Melbourne, and London. With others he established The Glasgow Bank, a successful private Bank of Issue (a bank able to issue currency). James Dennistoun retired in 1829 and died in 1835.

His sons, Alexander and John were educated at a grammar school and college in Glasgow, and entered the family business. About 1820 Alexander resided in New Orleans, where the firm had established a branch to facilitate their trade in cotton. On his return to Britain, he took charge of the company's Liverpool branch, and resided in Cheshire. He was known as a keen sportsman, a capital shot, and hunted regularly with the Ayrshire, the Lanarkshire, and the Cheshire hounds. He engaged in friendly rivalry with William Cobbett in agricultural pursuits, particularly in the raising of root crops, which were then comparatively in their infancy.

In 1823 he married Eleanor Jane, youngest daughter of John Thomson of Nassau, Bahamas – who had relocated to Liverpool – and a few years after went to Havre, where there was a branch of the house in charge of George Anderson. The family spent four years in Havre le Grace, where their daughter Eleanor Mary Dennistoun was born 19 September 1829.

On leaving Havre, Alexander Dennistoun went to Paris, where he was during the revolution of 1830, after which he returned to Glasgow, residing at Germiston and other places, till on the death of his father he took up his residence at Golfhill. This event also made both brothers largely interested in the Glasgow Bank. In 1836 that Bank formed an amalgamation with the old Ship Bank, becoming the Glasgow and Ship Bank. The expansion of business was rapidly outgrowing the system of private Banks, and joint stock Banks were to take their place. The Dennistouns, and other directors and shareholders of the Glasgow and Ship, were not slow to see the advantage of going with the times. Already the Glasgow Union Bank, a joint stock company, had absorbed the old Thistle Bank, Sir William Forbes & Co., the Paisley Union, and one or two other smaller concerns, and in 1843 a far more important amalgamation was arranged; the Glasgow Union joined the Glasgow and Ship in their new office, under the name of the Union Bank of Scotland, and so became the powerful institution now existing, Alexander Dennistoun, both before and after the junction, being frequently a director.

In 1834, shortly before the death of his father, Alexander Dennistoun was elected on 6 January 1835 as member of parliament for Dunbartonshire defeating Alexander Smollett of Bonhill. He served for two-and-a-half years, and Hansard records no contributions on the floor of the House of Commons. His daughter comments that Dennistoun "did not take kindly to parliamentary life, and gave it up when parliament was dissolved" in July 1837, never again trying for a seat.

In 1847 Mrs. Dennistoun died at Golfhill, leaving him with a large family. Here he continued to reside, alternating for summer quarters the villa of Lagarie, near Rhu on the banks of Gare Loch, for the remainder of a long and generally prosperous life. The only serious check to that prosperity occurred in the panic of November, 1857, when, partly through the failure of the Borough Bank of Liverpool, in which the Dennistouns were large shareholders, partly through the crisis in America, J & A Dennistoun had to suspend payment, with liabilities exceeding three millions sterling. The business was fundamentally sound and after a year's grace, repaid its creditors in full with five percent interest for the delay; and in a few years the firm itself had regained all it had lost by the stoppage.

Dennistoun died on 15 July 1874.

The Centre for the Study of the Legacies of British Slave-ownership note that an Alexander Dennistoun received £389 2s 4d compensation in 1837 for the freeing of 25 slaves in The Bahamas; it is possible, but not certain, that this was James Dennistoun of Golf Hill's son; and if so, the probability is that these were a legacy from John Thomson of Nassau to his daughter, Dennistoun's wife.

=== Dennistoun suburb ===
Dennistoun was responsible for the establishment of the Glasgow residential area of Dennistoun by buying up a number of contiguous plots of land, and laying out designs for roads, services, and commencing construction of properties. Over a period, as opportunity offered, he purchased the neighbouring properties of Craig Park, Whitehill, Meadow Park, Broom Park, Annfield, Bellfield, and Wester Craigs. The whole was surveyed and laid out in streets, terraces, and drives, by Glasgow architect James Salmon, who supervision to the development of the suburb.

The first plots in Dennistoun were leased from 1861; and on Glasgow Corporation acquiring the Kennyhill estate, and laying it out as the Alexandra Park, with the Alexandra Parade as its western approach, an impetus was given to the growth of the suburb and Alexander Dennistoun saw the chief scheme of his life being rapidly realized. In the last few years of his life it was his pride to drive round in his brougham, accompanied by some intimate friend, to show him how the improvements were going on.

Parliament of the United Kingdom
Preceded by John Campbell Colquhoun	Member of Parliament for Dumbartonshire; 1835 – 1837	Succeeded by James Colquhoun
