= Eleanor Mary Dennistoun Sellar =

Scottish memoirist (1829–1918)

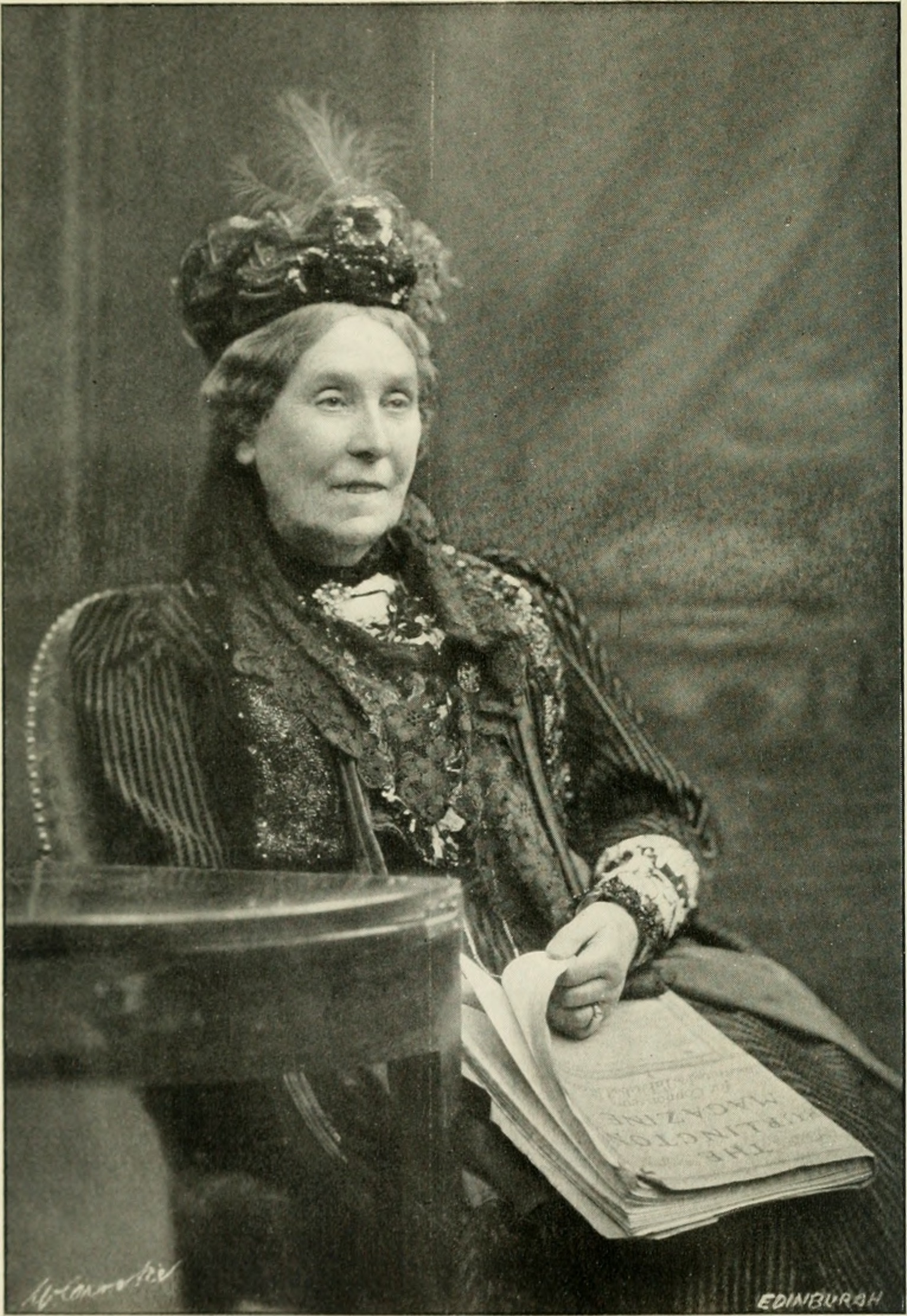
- Sellar in 1907
- Born: 19 September 1829; Havre de Grace, Normandy, France
- Died: 1918 (aged 88–89); Edinburgh, Scotland
- Occupation: memoirist
- Notable work: Recollections and Impressions (1907)
- Spouse: William Young Sellar (m. 1851)
- Children: 6
- Father: Alexander Dennistoun

Eleanor Mary Sellar (née Dennistoun, 19 September 1829 – 1918) was a Scottish memoirist.

== Biography ==
Sellar was born in Havre de Grace, Normandy, France, to Scottish parents. Her father was the wealthy Glasgow merchant Alexander Dennistoun (1790–1874), the eldest son of James Dennistoun.

She married William Young Sellar (1825–1890), Professor of Latin at Edinburgh University from 1863 until his death, in 1851. They had six children.

Her memoir Recollections and Impressions (1907), published by William Blackwood and Sons, was written to record the family history and was dedicated to "My Children, My Grandchildren and Great Grandchildren."

The book also recorded how she was bridesmaid to Margaret Balfour when she married Thomas Stevenson. They were the parents of novelist Robert Louise Stevenson.
