= Archibald Cochrane (politician) =

Scottish Unionist politician, Governor of Burma (1885–1958)

Captain The Honourable Sir Archibald Cochrane GCMG KCSI DSO & Bar
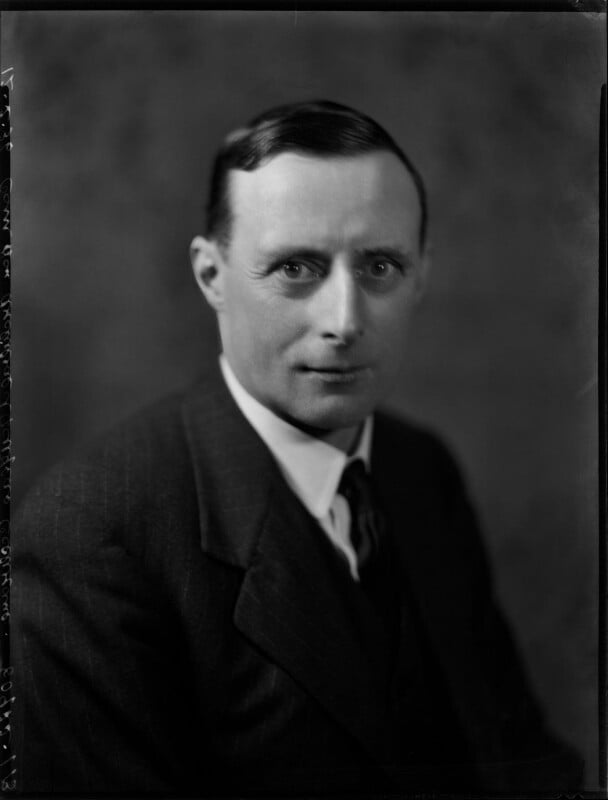
- Cochrane in 1936

Governor of Burma
- In office 8 May 1936 – 6 May 1941
- Preceded by: Sir Hugh Stephenson
- Succeeded by: Sir Reginald Dorman-Smith

Member of Parliament for Dunbartonshire
- In office 17 March 1932 – 18 March 1936
- Preceded by: John Thom
- Succeeded by: Thomas Cassells

Member of Parliament for East Fife
- In office 29 October 1924 – 10 May 1929
- Preceded by: James Duncan Millar
- Succeeded by: James Duncan Millar

Personal details
- Born: 8 January 1885
- Died: 16 April 1958 (aged 73)
- Party: Unionist Party
- Relations: Sir Ralph Cochrane (brother)
- Parents: Thomas Cochrane, 1st Baron Cochrane of Cults (father); Gertrude, Baroness Cochrane of Cults (mother)

Military service
- Allegiance: United Kingdom
- Branch/service: Royal Navy
- Years of service: 1901–22
- Rank: Captain
- Battles/wars: First World War
- Awards: Distinguished Service Order & Bar; Mentioned in dispatches (3)

Sir Archibald Douglas Cochrane, GCMG, KCSI, DSO & Bar (8 January 1885 – 16 April 1958) was a Scottish politician, naval officer, and colonial administrator who was Governor of Burma from 1936 to 1941. He was a Member of Parliament for East Fife from 1924 to 1929 and for Dunbartonshire from 1932 to 1936.

== Early life ==
The second son of Thomas Cochrane, 1st Baron Cochrane of Cults, he was born in Springfield, Fife in 1885. He ranked eighteenth among 62 successful candidates in examinations for entry to the Royal Navy training ship HMS Britannia intake term of September 1899, with 2374 marks, and joined as a naval cadet on the battleship HMS Mars in January 1901. In June 1902 he was posted as midshipman to the battleship HMS London, which was flagship for the Coronation Review for King Edward VII in August 1902 before she was posted to the Mediterranean Station later the same year. During the First World War he was mentioned in dispatches three times, and awarded the Distinguished Service Order and Bar.

== Political career ==
He was Unionist Member of Parliament (MP) for East Fife from 1924 until he lost the seat at the 1929 General Election. He then sat for Dunbartonshire from a 1932 by-election until 1936.

He was Governor of Burma from 1936 until 1941. He was also a director of Standard Life.

He was appointed a Knight Commander of the Order of the Star of India in 1936 and Knight Grand Cross of the Order of St Michael and St George in 1937.

He was promoted to the rank of captain on the Retired list in the Royal Navy on 3 September 1945.

== Personal life ==
On 6 January, 1926 he married Julia Dorothy, daughter of Fiennes Cornwallis, 1st Baron Cornwallis.

The couple had one son Douglas, and one daughter Mabel.

Parliament of the United Kingdom
Preceded by James Duncan Millar	Member of Parliament for East Fife; 1924–1929	Succeeded by James Duncan Millar
Preceded by John Thom	Member of Parliament for Dunbartonshire; 1932–1936	Succeeded by Thomas Cassells
Government offices
Preceded by Sir Hugh Stephenson	Governor of British Crown Colony of Burma; 1936–1941	Succeeded by Sir Reginald Dorman-Smith
