= Sheriff of the County of London =

Below is a list of sheriffs of the County of London, from the creation of the county in 1889 to its abolition in 1965:

- 1889–1890: Alfred Charles de Rothschild, of Seamore Place
- 1890–1891: Sir James Whitehead, 1st Baronet, of Highfield House, Catford Bridge
- 1891–1892: Martin Ridley Smith, of 13 Upper Belgrave Street
- 1892–1893: Bertram Wodehouse Currie, of 1 Richmond Terrace, Whitehall
- 1893–1894: Samuel Hope Morley, of 43 Upper Grosvenor Street
- 1894–1895: Ferdinand Huth, of 44 Upper Grosvenor Street
- 1895–1896: George Faudel-Phillips, of 36 Newgate Street
- 1896–1897: Henry Parkman Sturgis, of 4 Great Cumberland Place
- 1897–1898: Henry James Lubbock, of 15 Lombard Street
- 1898–1899: Samuel Henry Faudel-Phillips, of 17 Grosvenor Street
- 1899–1900: Sir Robert George Wyndham Herbert, of 3 Whitehall Court, SW
- 1900–1901: John Verity, of 18 Cadogan Place
- 1901–1902: Arthur Hill, of 22 Upper Grosvenor Street
- 1902–1903: George William Howard Bowen, of 67 Whitehall Court
- 1903–1904: Riversdale Grenfell, of the Guards' Club, Pall Mall
- 1904–1905: Benjamin Samuel Faudel-Phillips, of 52 Grosvenor Gardens
- 1905–1906: Allan Campbell, of 21 Upper Brook Street
- 1906–1907: St John Hornby, of Shelley House, Chelsea Embankment, SW
- 1907–1908: Robert Lydston Newman, of 11 Cadogan Square, SW
- 1908–1909: John Murray, of 50 Albemarle Street, W
- 1909–1910: George Herbert Verity, of 7 Basil Street
- 1910–1911: Herbert Brooks, of 17 Princes Gardens, SW
- 1911–1912: Charles Guy Pym, of 35 Cranley Gardens, SW
- 1912–1913: Geoffrey Lubbock, of 65 Lowndes Square, SW
- 1913–1914: Walter Cunliffe, of 86 Brook Street, W
- 1914–1915: John Murray, Jr., of 50 Albemarle Street, W
- 1915–1916: Ernest Tatham Richmond, of 12 Cheyne Gardens
- 1916–1917: Henry Alexander Trotter, of 19 Queen Street, W
- 1917–1918: Geoffrey Hope Morley, of 7 Connaught Place, W
- 1918–1919: Frederick Huth Jackson, of 64 Rutland Gate, SW
- 1919–1920: Henry John Gardiner, of 25 Tavistock Square, WC1
- 1920–1921: Colonel Lionel Henry Hanbury, of Hitcham House, Burnham, Buckinghamshire
- 1921–1922: Algernon Osmond Miles, of 15 Thorney Court, Palace Gate
- 1922–1923: Sir Alan Garrett Anderson, of 19 Craven Hill, W2
- 1923–1924: Walter Kennedy Whigham, of 2 Chesham Street, SW1,
- 1924–1925: Sir Samuel Ernest Palmer, Bt., of 10 Grosvenor Crescent, SW1
- 1925–1926: Arthur Whitworth, of 16 Norfolk Crescent, Hyde Park, W2
- 1926–1927: Michael Seymour Spencer-Smith, of 34, Dover Street, W1
- 1927–1928: Sir William Plender, of 51 Kensington Court, W8
- 1928–1929: Capt. the Hon. Roland Dudley Kitson, of 3 Victoria Street, SW1
- 1929–1930: Albert Charles Gladstone, of 23 Hyde Park Place, W1
- 1930–1931: The Hon. George Charles Colville, 66 Eccleston Square, SW1,
- 1931–1932: The Hon. Alexander Shaw, of 24 Princes Gate, SW7
- 1932–1933: Sir Ernest John Pickstone Benn, of 2 Whitehall Court, SW1
- 1933–1934: Charles Jocelyn Hambro, of 18 New Cavendish Street, W1
- 1934–1935: Victor Blagden, of 46 Park Street, W1
- 1935–1936: Charles Morley, of 83 Harley House, Regents Park, NW1
- 1936–1937: George Macaulay Booth, of 28 Chester Street, SW1
- 1937–1938: Herbert Arthur Baker, of 1 Clarendon Place, W2
- 1938–1939: Claude Hope Hope-Morley, of 42 Grosvenor Square, W1
- 1939–1940: Sir Andrew Rae Duncan, of Dunure, Foxgrove Road, Beckenham, Kent
- 1940–1941: Basil Gage Catterns, of 9 Dorchester Court, Sloane Street, SW1
- 1941–1942: Edward Holland-Martin, of 24a Bryanston Square, W1
- 1942–1943: Dallas Gerald Mercer Bernard, of Howard Hotel, Norfolk Street, Strand, WC2
- 1943–1944: John Coldbrook Hanbury-Williams, of 16 St Martin's-le-Grand, EC1
- 1944–1945: Sir Patrick Ashley Cooper, of Claridge's Hotel, Brook Street, W1
- 1945–1946: Sir Otto Ernst Niemeyer, of Claridge's Hotel, Brook Street, W.1.
- 1946–1947: Cameron Fromanteel Cobbold, of Flat 856, The White House, Albany Street, N.W.1.
- 1947–1948: Laurence John Cadbury, of Flat 68, 56 Curzon Street, Mayfair, W.1.
- 1948–1949: Basil Sanderson, 1st Baron Sanderson of Ayot, of Ayot Bury, Welwyn, Hertfordshire.
- 1949–1950: Harry Arthur Siepmann, of 107, Pall Mall, S.W.1.
- 1950–1951: Ralph Ellis Brook, of Chestnut Lodge, Squire's Mount, N.W.3.
- 1951–1952: Hugh Kindersley, 2nd Baron Kindersley, of 9, North Audley Street, W.1.
- 1952–1953: Sir George Lewis French Bolton, of 39a, Bryanston Court, George Street, W.1.
- 1953–1954: Michael James Babington Smith, of 10, Chester Row, S.W.1.
- 1954–1955: Geoffrey Cecil Ryves Eley, of 1, Pembroke Villas, W.8.
- 1955–1956: William Antony Acton, of 115, Eaton Square, S.W.1.
- 1956–1957: Sir Charles Jocelyn Hambro, of 72, North Gate, Regent's Park, N.W.8.
- 1957–1958: Sir Patrick Ashley Cooper, of 178, St. James's Court, Buckingham Gate, S.W.1.
- 1958–1959: Sir John Coldbrook Hanbury-Williams, of 7 Princes Gate, S.W.7.
- 1959–1960: Laurence John Cadbury, of Carrington House, Hertford Street, London W.1.
- 1960–1961: John Nicholson Hogg, of 22 Pelham Crescent, London S.W.7.
- 1961–1962: Sir George Lewis French Bolton, of 809 Beatty House, Dolphin Square, London S.W.1.
- 1962–1963: Michael James Babington Smith, of 10 Chester Row, S.W.1.
- 1963–1964: Sir (Frank) Cyril Hawker, of 3 Wildcroft Manor, Putney Heath, S.W.15.
- 1964–1965: John Melior Stevens, of 62 Bedford Gardens, W.8.

== See also ==
- High Sheriff of Greater London
- Sheriffs of the City of London
