= Stamford House, Wimbledon =

House in Wimbledon, London

Stamford House
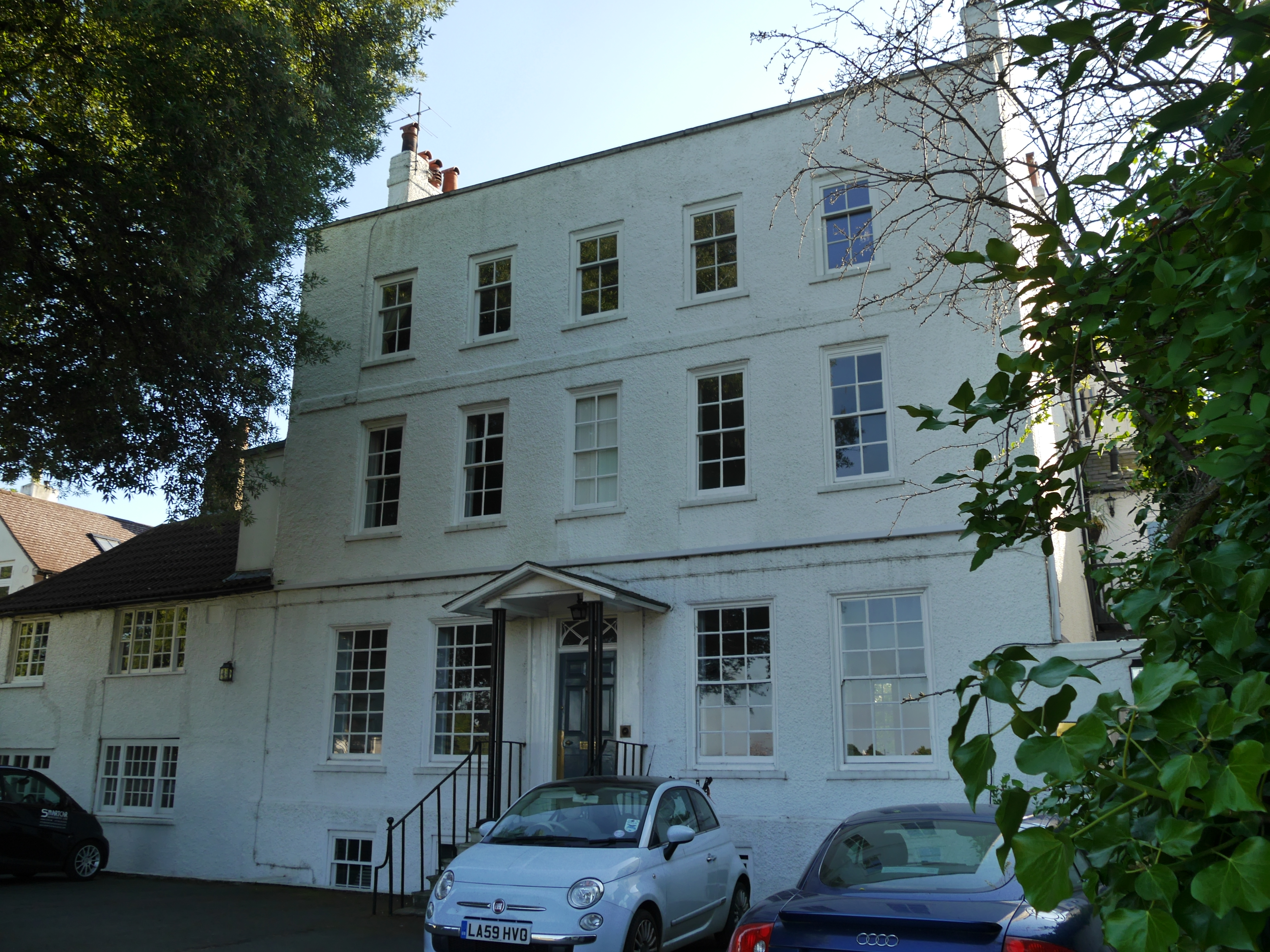
- Stamford House in 2016

- Location within London Borough of Merton

General information
- Status: Grade II listed
- Type: House
- Location: West Side, Wimbledon Common, London, England
- Coordinates: 51.425598°N 0.228768°W
- Completed: c. 1720

Stamford House is a Grade II listed house on the west side of Wimbledon Common, Wimbledon, London, built in about 1720.

Stamford House housed a "series of local vicars", and later became a school.

From 1926 to 1940, there was a theosophical community living at Stamford House, led by Edward Lewis Gardner (1869-1969), who was a leading member of the Theosophical Society in England, and its general secretary from 1924 to 1928.

Soldiers were billeted here during the Second World War, after which it was converted into nine flats.
