= Hanford Row =

Coordinates: 51.423971°N 0.228774°W

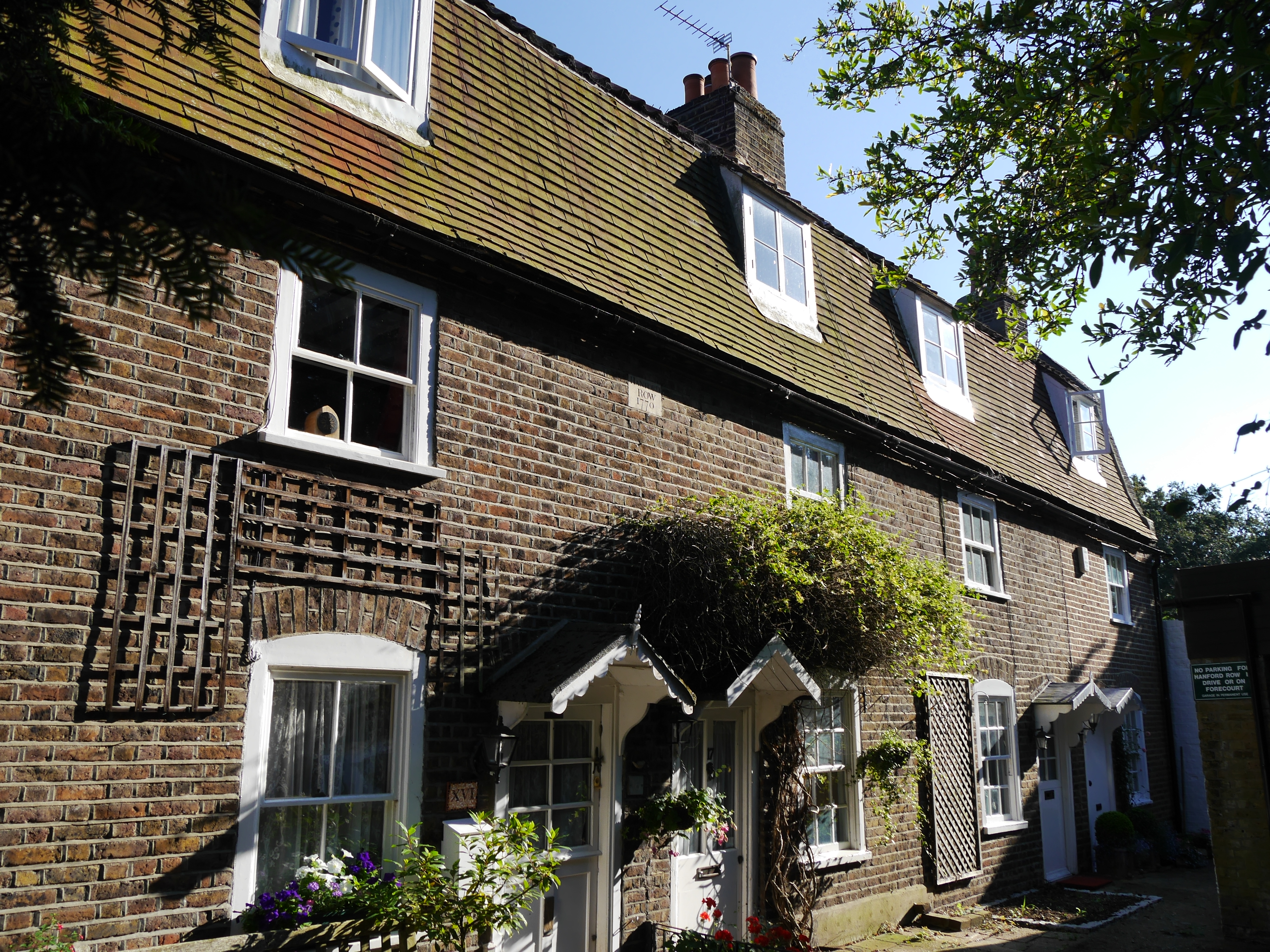
Hanford Row, Wimbledon, 2016

Hanford Row is a Grade II listed row of six terraced houses set back from the west side of Wimbledon Common, Wimbledon, London, that was built in the 1760s. These six labourers' cottages were named after their builder, William Hanford, a London businessman. The steep mansard roofs with dormer windows were a later addition.
