= Wimbledon Windmill =

Windmill in London, England

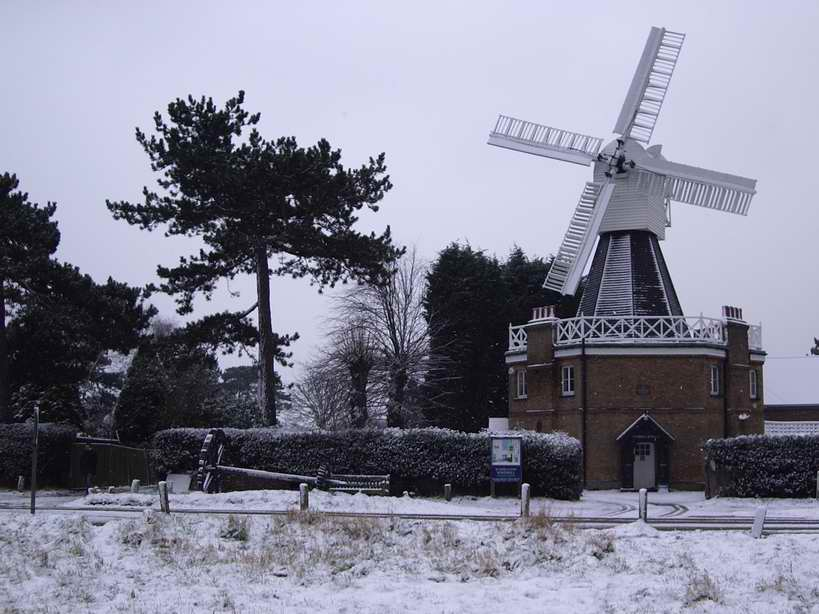
- Wimbledon Windmill, February 2005
- Interactive map of Wimbledon Windmill

Origin
- Mill name: Wimbledon Windmill
- Mill location: Wimbledon Common, London
- Grid reference: TQ 230 725
- Coordinates: 51.437622°N 0.232000°W
- Operators: Wimbledon and Putney Commons Conservators
- Year built: 1817

Information
- Purpose: Corn mill
- Type: Smock mill
- Base storeys: Two storey base
- Smock sides: Eight sides
- No. of sails: Four
- Type of sails: Patent sails
- Windshaft: Cast iron
- Winding: Fantail
- Fantail blades: Six blades
- Other information: Website: wimbledonwindmill.org.uk

Wimbledon Windmill is a Grade II* listed windmill situated on Wimbledon Common in the London Borough of Merton (originally in Surrey), in the west of South London, and is preserved as a museum.

== History ==
An application to build a windmill on the Common was denied in 1799 when the applicant, one John Watney, failed to produce plans for the proposed mill when requested. In 1816, Charles March, a carpenter of Roehampton applied for permission to build a windmill. The request was granted the following year and the mill was built. The mill stopped working in 1864, when the miller was evicted by the Lord of the Manor, Earl Spencer, who wanted to enclose the common for his own use. The miller insisted on removing most of the machinery so that the mill could not be operated in competition with his other mills at Kingston. The main mill building was rebuilt with brickwork to provide living accommodation.

The enclosure of the common was strongly opposed by the local people, who successfully got the 1871 Wimbledon and Putney Commons Act passed, handing the care of the commons to elected and appointed conservators. In 1892, tenders for the repair of the mill were sought by the Commons Conservators, and Messrs. Sanderson & Sons tender of £240 was accepted. Royal Wimbledon Golf Club contributed £50 towards the cost of the repairs. During repairs, it was discovered that the main Post and Crosstrees were rotten and Sandersons proposed converting the mill to a smock mill, at a total cost of £350. The work was reported as being complete in November 1893. The original patent sails were replaced by a shorter set of sails with fixed shutters. After the loss of a sail in the 1920s another set of sails with fewer shutters was placed on the mill.

During World War II, the mill was camouflaged with a drab green scheme to reduce its visibility and one of its sails was removed, as it was near army camps set up on the Common. The mill was repainted after the war ended, but the sails were stopped in 1946 due to excessive wear in the gearing. In 1952, the mill was inspected and a list of repairs drawn up. After a public appeal in 1954 to raise funds, the mill was restored and the sails turned again on 25 May 1957. The mill was restored again in 1975 and turned into a museum. In 1999 a grant from the Heritage Lottery Fund enabled the patent sails to be restored to working order. The museum, initially only on one floor but extended to two in 1999, depicts the story of windmills from their early origins up to the present day, using models, examples of machinery and tools of the trade. A room from one of the smaller apartments is preserved to illustrate how the building was used as accommodation. It is no longer a working mill, but a finely detailed model shows the machinery as it was in its working days.

On 2 August 2015, a sail fell from the mill, damaging the base below. The collapse of the sail was caused by long-term water ingress. The sails were restored in 2016.

== Description ==
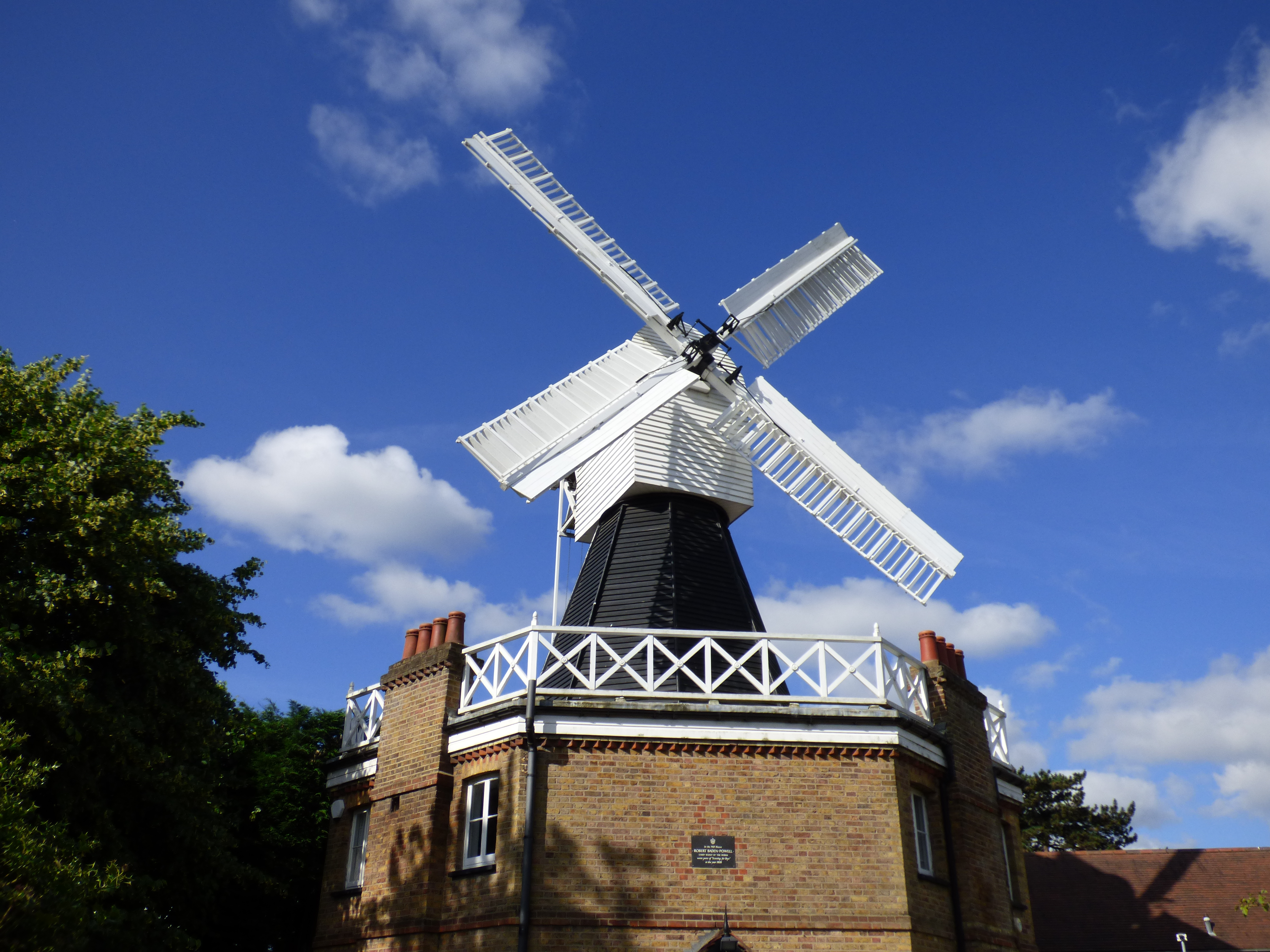
Wimbledon Windmill, June 2014

Wimbledon Windmill was built as a hollow post mill, with the drive to the stones passing through the centre of the main post. It was a hollow post mill for its entire working life, but was rebuilt as a smock mill when it was preserved in 1893. The mill has double patent sails and is winded by a fantail. The windmill has an octagonal brick base of two stories, above which is a conical tower formerly housing the main post. The cast-iron windshaft carries four double patent sails, and a 6 feet (1.83 m) diameter cast iron Brake Wheel with about 60 wooden cogs, which formerly drove the cast-iron Wallower carried on a cast iron Upright Shaft. A Spur Wheel at the lower end of the upright shaft would have driven the millstones on the upper floor of the mill. The conversion from Hollow Post mill to a Smock mill was done by Sanderson's, the Louth millwrights.

== Millers ==
- Dann – 1840
- A Halloway – 1858
- John Marsh – 1860s

== Culture and media ==
The Mill House of Wimbledon Windmill is where Robert Baden-Powell stayed in 1902 and wrote parts of Scouting for Boys, which was published in 1908. Wimbledon Windmill also featured in the Doctor Who episode titled The Massacre of St Bartholomew's Eve (Bell of Doom) which was filmed in 1966. It also appears in the 1952 film "Hammer the Toff". It also appears briefly in the 1970 Peter Sellers Film Hoffman.

== Public access ==
The windmill is now a museum, detailing its own history, as well as the history of windmills in general. The museum is open at weekends and Bank Holidays from March to October. It features interactive exhibits, such as push-button models and grain-grinding activities, in addition to visitors being able to explore the layout and use of the actual mill. The windmill and the nearby café are situated on the Common adjacent to both open spaces and woodland.
