= Old Central School =

Former school in Wimbledon, London, England

Coordinates: 51.42633°N 0.23202°W

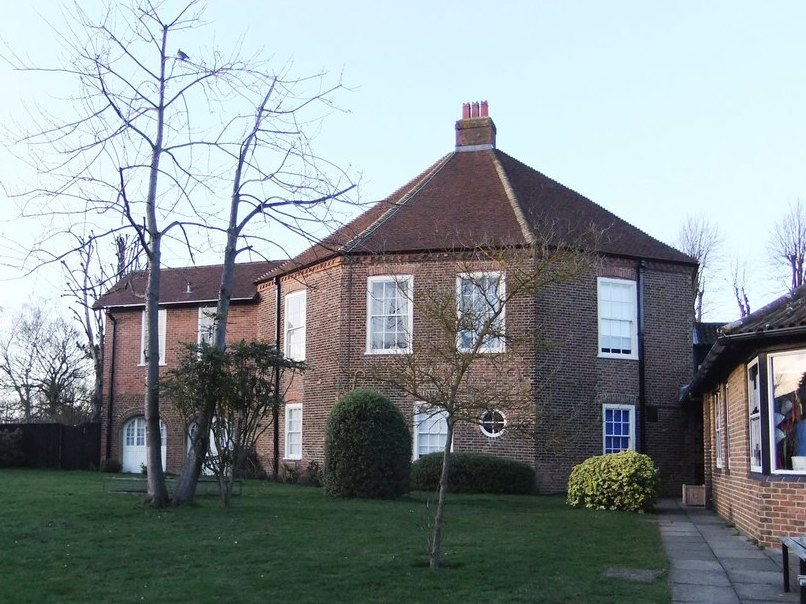

Information
- Established: 1758
- Closed: 1965
- Gender: Mixed
- Enrollment: 100 (50 boys and 50 girls) (1773)

Old Central School was a school on Wimbledon Common, south-west London, founded in 1758. It closed in 1965 when its role was taken over by Bishop Gilpin School, a new school on a different site in Wimbledon.

The original octagonal school building in Camp Road, built in 1758, was still standing in 2012 and in use as part of a private school, The Study.

== History ==
In June 1757, a group of local dignitaries met one Saturday night at the Rose and Crown pub in Wimbledon village to discuss plans for a charity school. Enough money had been raised since the idea had been raised two years earlier and now the details had to be worked out. In 1758 the manor court gave permission for the vicar and others to "inclose and fence in - a certain piece or parcel of land, lying on Wimbledon Common for the use of a charity school" and the first octagonal building was put up.

It was not the first charity school in Wimbledon. The SPCK listed two charity schools in Wimbledon in its report for 1724. But many of the charity schools founded around the country at the start of the 18th century had closed down because of lack of support.

Initially, progress was not smooth after the construction of the school building. The schoolmaster quarrelled with the parish officials and the school was not running properly until 1773 when the building was repaired and a minute-book was begun that continued to be used until 1839.

The first trustees included the vicar, Rev. John Cooksey and William Wilberforce, uncle of the anti-slavery campaigner of the same name. The school was supported by subscription. The Lord of the Manor, the first Earl Spencer gave 10 guineas a year. The future prime minister, the Marquess of Rockingham gave five while he lived in Wimbledon.

In 1773 Joseph Andrewes was appointed schoolmaster at £50 a year to teach 50 boys and 50 girls with the help of his wife and he continued in the post until his death 15 years later. The curriculum was confined to reading (the Bible was the textbook), writing, and, beginning in 1778, four rules of arithmetic.

William Wilberforce, nephew of one of the original trustees, was treasurer to the school for a short time while he lived in Wimbledon. Lord Nelson, whose estate extended into Wimbledon, also gave his support to the school: the 1806 accounts include "credited Lord Viscount Nelson and Lady Hamilton £4 4s. 0d" (four guineas).

Known as the National School for much of the 19th century, it was referred to as "Old Central" in a document of 1893, possibly to distinguish it from the new schools that had been set up in Wimbledon since the Education Act of 1870 had extended elementary education to all children.

John William Selby was headmaster of the school in 1889 and first chairman of the Old Central football club, who later became Wimbledon F.C. and played on the Wimbledon Common during their formative years.

The headmaster in 1950 was a Mr Henning; ‘Pop’ Henning is remembered as remaining headmaster during the period 1955-1964, and drove a grey Ford 100E, registration ending ‘...24’. Other teachers remembered during that era included Mr Snowdon, Mrs Greet, and Miss Venables, mrs Pitman, Mr Knowling (from New Zealand)
