= David Hartley (the Younger) =

English politician and inventor (1732–1813)

David Hartley (the Younger) MP
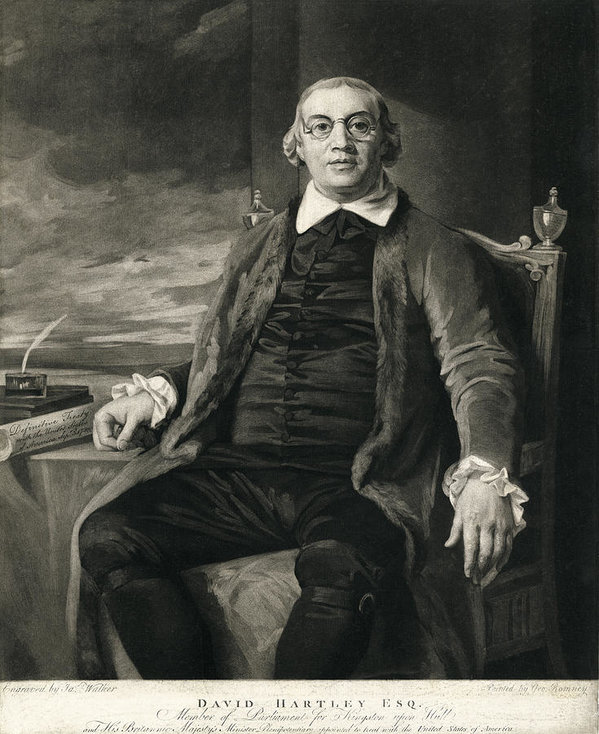
- Engraving by James Walker 1859

Member of Parliament for Kingston upon Hull East

Personal details
- Born: 1732 Bath, Somerset, Kingdom of Great Britain
- Died: 19 December 1813 (aged 80–81) Bath, Somerset, United Kingdom
- Party: Rockingham Whig
- Education: Corpus Christi College, Oxford
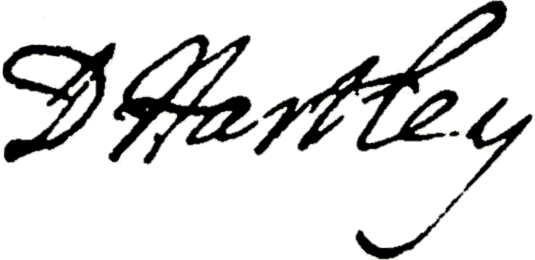
- Signature

David Hartley the Younger (1732 – 19 December 1813) was an English politician and inventor and the son of the philosopher David Hartley. He was Member of Parliament (MP) for Kingston upon Hull, and also held the position of His Britannic Majesty's Minister Plenipotentiary, appointed by King George III to treat with the United States of America as to American independence and other issues after the American Revolution. He was a signatory to the 1783 Treaty of Paris, which ended the American Revolutionary War. Hartley was the first MP to put the case for abolition of the slave trade before the House of Commons, moving a resolution in 1776 that "the slave trade is contrary to the laws of God and the rights of men".

== Life ==
Hartley was born in Bath, Somerset, England in 1732. He matriculated at Corpus Christi College, Oxford on 6 April 1747 at age 15. He was awarded his B.A. on 14 March 1750 and was a fellow of Merton College, Oxford until his death. He became a student of Lincoln's Inn in 1759. During the 1760s, he gained recognition as a scientist and, through mutual interests, he met and became an intimate friend and correspondent of Benjamin Franklin. Hartley was sympathetic to the Lord Rockingham's Whigs, although he did not hold office in either Rockingham ministry. He represented Kingston upon Hull in parliament from 1774 to 1780, and from 1782 to 1784, and attained considerable reputation as an opponent of the war with America, and of the African slave trade. A fellow abolitionist of slavery, William Wilberforce, took Hartley's place as MP for Hull in 1780 and was co-member during Hartley's second term.

He was expert in public finance and spoke frequently in Parliament in opposition to the war in America. Although a liberal on American policy, Hartley was a long-time friend of Lord North and strongly disliked Prime Minister Shelburne. He supported the Coalition by voting against Shelburne's peace preliminaries. It was probably owing to his friendship with Benjamin Franklin, and to his consistent support of Lord Rockingham, that he was selected by the government to act as plenipotentiary in Paris, where, on 3 September 1783, he and Franklin drew up and signed the definitive treaty of peace between Great Britain and the United States.

Hartley died at Bath on 19 December 1813, aged 82.

His portrait was painted by George Romney and has been engraved by John Walker in mezzotint. Nathaniel William Wraxall says that Hartley, "though destitute of all personal recommendation of manner, possessed some talent with unsullied probity, added to indefatigable perseverance and labour". He adds that his speeches were intolerably long and dull, and that "his rising always operated like a dinner bell" (Memoirs, iii. 490).

== Writings ==
Hartley's writings are mostly political, and set forth the arguments of the extreme liberals of his time. In 1764 he wrote a vigorous attack on the Bute administration, "inscribed to the man who thinks himself a minister". His most important writings are his Letters on the American War, published in London in 1778 and 1779, and addressed to his constituents. "The road", he writes, "is open to national reconciliation between Great Britain and America. The ministers have no national object in view . . . the object was to establish an influential dominion of the crown by means of an independent American revenue uncontrolled by parliament". He seeks throughout to vindicate the opposition to the war. In 1794 he printed at Bath a sympathetic Argument on the French Revolution, addressed to his parliamentary electors.

Hartley edited his father's well-known Observations on Man, in London 1791 and (with notes and additions) in 1801.

In 1859, a number of Hartley's papers were sold in London. Six volumes of letters and other documents relating to the peace went to America and passed into the collection of Levi Leiter of Washington, D.C.; others are in the British Museum.

== Inventions ==
In his last years, Hartley studied chemistry and mechanics. In 1774 he published Account of a Method of Securing Buildings and Ships against Fire, by placing thin iron planks under floors and attaching them to the ceilings, partly to prevent immediate access of the fire, and partly to stop the free supply of air. He built a house Wildcroft Manor on Putney Heath to verify the efficacy of his invention. An obelisk was built on the heath, adjacent to Tibbet's corner, 1776 marking the Lord Mayor of London's decision to give Hartley £2,500 for work on his fire plates. It makes mention of its being erected on the 110th anniversary of the Great Fire of London. On the occasion of a fire at Richmond House, on 21 December 1791, he wrote a pamphlet urging the value of his fire plates.

The brick obelisk with heavily inscribed foundation stone still stands on Putney Heath, near where the A219 veers from the A3 at Tibbet's Corner, towards Putney. There is no parking at the site; however there is parking and footpath access from near the adjacent Telegraph Pub, off Wildcroft Road. Since 1955 the obelisk has been a Grade II listed building.

The inscription reads:

– South face (towards the A3):

THE RT. HON. JOHN SAWBRIDGE SQRE
LORD MAYOR OF LONDON
LAID THE FOUNDATION STONE
OF THIS OBELISK
ONE HUNDRED AND TEN YEARS
AFTER THE FIRE OF LONDON
ON THE ANNIVERSARY
OF THAT DREADFUL EVENT
IN MEMORY OF AN INVENTION
FOR SECURING BUILDINGS
AGAINST FIRE.

– East face:

By VIRTUE of an ORDER of the Right Hon. the
LORD MAYOR ALDERMEN and COMMONS of
the CITY of LONDON in Common Council
Assembled Dated the 22nd. November 1776
DAVID HARTLEY Esq. was admitted into the FREEDOM
of the said CITY in the COMPANY of GOLDSMITHS
in the time of the Rt. Hon Sr. THOMAS HALLIFAX KNt.
LORD MAYOR and BENJAMIN HOPKINS ESQ CHAMBERLAIN
in CONSIDERATION of the ADVANTAGES likely to accrue to the
PUBLIC by his INVENTION of FIRE PLATES for securing
buildings from FIRE and for his respectful attention to this CITY
in his repeated EXPERIMENTS performed before many of the
members of the COURT. The RECORD of which EXPERIMENTS
and also of his admission into the FREEDOM of the said CITY of
LONDON is entered in the BOOK signed with the letter R["¦?]c
IN WITNESS whereof the SEAL of the Office of CHAMBERLAIN
thereunto affixed DATED in the GUILD-HALL of the same
CITY the 26th. day of March in the 17th. Year of the Reign of
Our SOVEREIGN LORD GEORGE the THIRD &c
And in the Year of Our LORD MDCCLXXVII

Hartley's Patent (Fire Prevention) Act 1776
- Act of Parliament
- Parliament of Great Britain
- Long title: An Act for vesting in David Hartley Esquire, his Executors, Administrators and Assigns, the sole Use and Property of a certain Method, by him invented, of securing Buildings against the Calamities of Fire, throughout His Majesty's Dominions, for a limited Time.
- Citation: 17 Geo. 3. c. 6
- Territorial extent: Great Britain

Dates
- Royal assent: 3 March 1777
- Commencement: 31 October 1776 (Note: Start of session.)
- Repealed: 30 July 1948
Other legislation
Repealed by	Statute Law Revision Act 1948

Status: Repealed

Text of statute as originally enacted

– North Face (towards the car park and public house):

By the COMMONS of GREAT BRITAIN
IN PARLIAMENT ASSEMBLED
2E Lunœ 16° Die Maii 1774
RESOLVED NE MINE CONTRADICENTE
That a sum not exceeding Two Thousand Five Hundred
Pounds be granted to His MAJESTY to be paid
To DAVID HARTLEY, ESQR.
Towards enabling him to defray the Charge of
Experiments in order to ascertain the practicability
and Utility of his INVENTION for securing buildings
from FIRE and that the same be paid without Fee
or Reward

Confirmed by ACT of Parliament
ANNO 14° GEORG II 3lu REGIS

– West face:

HALLIFAX MAYOR
A COMMON COUNCIL holden
in the Chamber of the GUILD-HALL of the
CITY of LONDON on the 22nd. of November 1776
RESOLVED.
That JOHN SAWBRIDGE ESQ. the late
LORD MAYOR of this CITY having laid a
Foundation Stone for erecting an Obelisk on
Putney Common to commemorate the invention
of FIRE PLATES for securing buildings from FIRE
By DAVID HARTLEY ESQ
The Committee of City Lands be empowered
to erect and complete the same.

== See also ==
- List of abolitionist forerunners

== Notes ==
Parliament of Great Britain
Preceded by William Weddell; Lord Robert Manners	Member of Parliament for Kingston upon Hull; 1774–1780; With: Lord Robert Manners	Succeeded by William Wilberforce; Lord Robert Manners
Preceded by Lord Robert Manners; William Wilberforce	Member of Parliament for Kingston upon Hull; 1782–1784; With: William Wilberforce	Succeeded by Samuel Thornton; William Wilberforce
