= Wildcroft Manor =

Historic site in London, England

Coordinates: 51.4484872°N 0.2295479°W

Wildcroft Manor is a historic site in Putney in the London Borough of Wandsworth, with private housing and a Grade II Listed iron gateway.

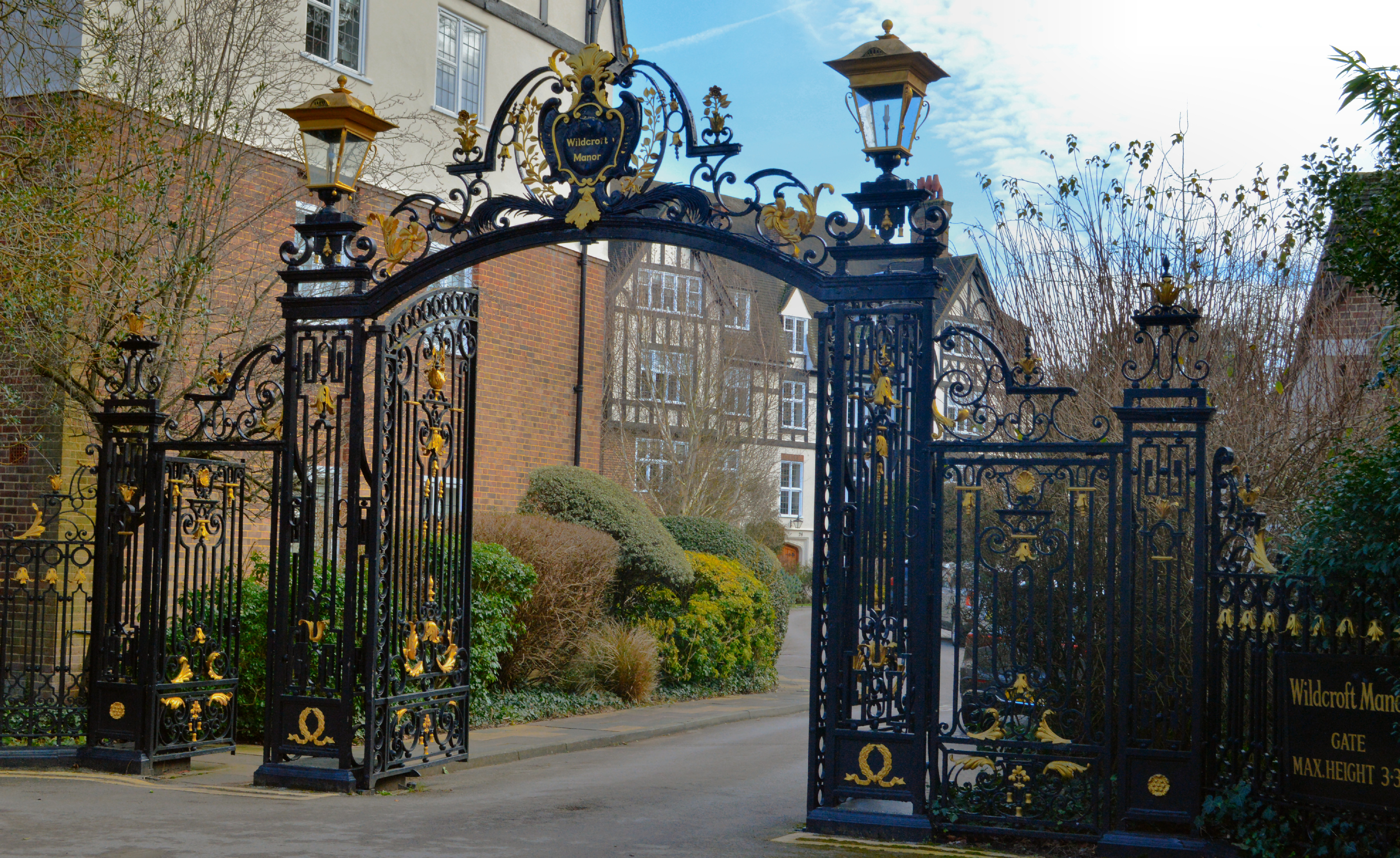
Gates to Wildcroft Manor

== Location ==
The estate is located on Wildcroft road within Putney Heath, between the Telegraph pub and the A3 dual carriageway.

== History ==
The original building was built in 1776 by politician David Hartley (the Younger) 1732–1813 who received a grant of £2500 to build an experimental fireproof house. A Grade II listed obelisk nearby on Putney Heath commemorates this innovation.

The building was later home to publisher George Newnes 1851–1910, architect of Putney Library, who was made baronet "of Wildcroft, in the parish of Putney" in 1895. Newnes demolished and rebuilt the building in 1877 and it was visited by writer Naomi Royde-Smith as a child from 1900. The wrought iron gates were built around 1900 by J & C McLaughlin (likely McGloughlin) Ltd, Dublin, and were Grade II listed in 1983.

Later buildings were built in the mid 1930s in Art Deco style, with 56 flats created on the site of the former manor, in four-storey blocks in Tudor vernacular. A V1 flying bomb fell on the site on 3 July 1944, killing Canadian firefighter J.S. Coull (Winnipeg) and caused serious damage to all buildings on the site. Entertainer Ian Whitcomb later lived on the site in the 1960s, as well as Sir (Frank) Cyril Hawker Sheriff of London 1963–1964.
