= George Bolton (banker) =

British banker (1900–1982)

Sir George Bolton KCMG
- Sir George Bolton in 1970
- Born: 16 October 1900; Hackney, London, England
- Died: 2 September 1982 (aged 81); Westminster, London, England
- Occupation: Banker
- Awards: Order of St Michael and St George KCMG Order of May (Merit - Civil order) Order of Merit

Sir George Lewis French Bolton KCMG (16 October 1900 – 2 September 1982) was a British banker who was noted for his expertise in the foreign exchange market and as a leading influence on the rebirth of London after the Second World War. He served as director of the Bank of England, chairman for the Bank of London and South America and executive director of the International Monetary Fund. He twice served as High Sheriff of the County of London.

== Early life ==
Bolton was born in Lower Clapton, Hackney, London in 1900, the son of William Bolton, a shipping clerk, and Beatrice (née French). He went to school at Leyton County High school in Waltham Forest.

== Banking career ==
At age 16, he joined the London branch of the Société Générale de Paris to be trained as an exchange dealer. In 1920, he joined the merchant banking firm of Helbert, Wagg & Co., and learned the trade in London and Paris. At Helbert, Wegg, & Co., Bolton started and managed a successful foreign exchange dealing department. After the Bank of England had abandoned the gold standard in 1931, the bank sought out Bolton for his expertise in this industry. In 1933, Bolton joined the Bank of England, where he was largely responsible for the market management of sterling exchange rate, using the resources of the Exchange Equalisation Account created by Neville Chamberlain the previous year.

During the late 1930s, Bolton was involved with classified preparations for a structure of wartime exchange control plans, which were implemented when the war broke out in 1939. From 1941 to 1948, Bolton served as an adviser to the Bank of England's Board of Governors on policies of development of the sterling area, in addition to the technical apparatus of foreign exchange control. In 1948, he was named Executive Director of the Bank of England.

From 1946 to 1952, Bolton was the UK's executive director of the International Monetary Fund and Alternate Governor from 1952 to 1957. He also served as director of the Bank for International Settlements.

In 1957, he became chairman of the Bank of London and South America (BOLSA), staying in that role until he retired in 1970.

In 1962 Bolton played a key role in the envisioning and establishment of the London eurobond market, a major subsequent source of income for the City of London.

After his retirement, he remained a director of BOLSA, and subsequently of Lloyds Bank International, after their merger in 1974.

== Other roles ==
Bolton also served in various other positions and sat on the boards of many companies, including the Canadian Pacific Railway Company and the Sun Life Assurance Company of Canada. He was deputy chairman of Bank of London and Montreal and chairman of the Commonwealth Development Finance Corporation. He was High Sheriff of the County of London in 1952–52 and 1961–62, and governor of the London School of Economics.

== Book ==
After his retirement in 1970, a collection of his speeches and writings on London was published as a book, Banker's World: The Revival of the City 1957–1970, edited by Richard Fry, former financial editor of The Guardian, with a preface by Sir Frank Lee, Permanent Secretary of the Treasury.

== Honours ==
Bolton was knighted as a Commander of the Order of Saint Michael and Saint George in the 1950 New Year Honours.

In 1960, he was appointed a Gran Oficial of the Order of May by the Argentine government, and in 1965 was awarded the Order of Merit from Chile.

- Order of St Michael and St George (Knight Commander) (KCMG) (Great Britain)
- Order of May (Merit - Civil order) (Grand Officer) (Note: Spanish: Orden de Mayo (Al Mérito) - Gran Oficial) (Argentina)
- Order of Merit (Class III - Grand Officer (Gran Oficial)) (Chile)

== Personal life ==
In 1928, Bolton married May Howcroft. They had one son, Nicholas George, and two daughters, Sheila and Gillian. He died in London in 1981. Nicholas married the Hon. Lavinia Valerie Woodhouse, daughter of David Woodhouse, 4th Baron Terrington, and their daughter Carina married Alexander Burton Conyngham, Earl of Mount Charles, heir to the Marquessate of Conyngham.

== Notes ==
Honorary titles
Preceded by Baron Kindersley	High Sheriff of the County of London; 1952–1953	Succeeded by Michael James Babington Smith
Preceded by John Nicholson Hogg	High Sheriff of the County of London; 1961–1962	Succeeded by Michael James Babington Smith
