= Michael Babington Smith =

English banker, soldier, fencer and cricketer

Michael Babington Smith CBE TD
- Babington Smith in 1949
- Born: Michael James Babington Smith; 20 March 1901; Constantinople, Ottoman Empire (modern-day Istanbul, Turkey)
- Died: 26 October 1984 (aged 83); Kensington and Chelsea, London
- Education: Eton College; Trinity College, Cambridge
- Occupation: Banker
- Spouse: Lady Jean Babington Smith
- Children: 3
- Parents: Sir Henry Babington Smith (father); Lady Elisabeth Bruce (mother)
- Relatives: Victor Bruce, 9th Earl of Elgin (grandfather); Constance Babington Smith (sister)
- Family: Babington family
- Military career
- Allegiance: United Kingdom
- Branch: British Army
- Service years: 1925–1945
- Rank: Brigadier
- Units: Leicestershire Yeomanry, Home Guard
- Conflicts: World War II
- Awards: CBE; Legion of Honour; Croix de Guerre

Brigadier Michael James Babington Smith CBE TD (20 March 1901 – 26 October 1984), known in London as MJBS, was a British banker, sportsman and soldier from the Babington family. During the Second World War, he served under General Dwight D. Eisenhower as Director of Finance at SHAEF from 1943 to 1945. Following the war, he was a director of the Bank of England for two decades. He served as treasurer of the National Art Collections Fund and was twice High Sheriff of the County of London.

== Early life and education ==
Babington Smith was born in Constantinople in 1901, the son of Sir Henry Babington Smith, a British civil servant who was serving on the council of the Ottoman Public Debt Administration, and later became a director of the Bank of England. His paternal grandfather was lawyer and mathematician Archibald Smith of Jordanhill and his brothers were MP James Parker Smith and curator Arthur Hamilton Smith, Keeper of Greek and Roman Antiquities at the British Museum. His mother was Lady Elisabeth Bruce, daughter of the 9th Earl of Elgin, who was Viceroy of India from 1894 to 1899. Michael was the eldest of 10 children; one of his younger sisters was journalist Constance Babington Smith MBE (1911–2000). Another sister, Lucy, married Henry Sinclair, 2nd Baron Pentland. His brother Bernard Babington Smith OBE (1905–1993) was an academic, wartime intelligence officer and amateur athlete.

Michael attended Eton College, where he had a successful cricket career, followed by Trinity College, Cambridge. He was active in various other sports throughout his life, including shooting, stalking and fencing. He was a five-time finalist in the British foil championships and was captain of the England fencing team in 1931.

== Career ==
=== Banking career ===
In 1923, Babington Smith joined Glyn, Mills & Co. He spent 50 years at the bank, becoming a partner in 1932, the managing director in 1938, and deputy chairman in 1946. In 1946, he was appointed to the Court of Directors of the Bank of England. He was appointed a director of the Bank of England in 1949, a first for a director of a clearing bank, a position he held for 20 years.

Babington Smith spent his entire career with Glyn's, but also served as a director for numerous other institutions, including the Bank for International Settlements (1965–74), the London Committee for the Ottoman Bank (from 1947; serving as chairman, 1975–82), the Royal Bank of Scotland (1938–63), Banque de Suez (1957–74), and the holding company AEI (1949–68).

=== Military service ===
Babington Smith was part of the Officer Training Corps at Cambridge and was commissioned into the Territorial Army as a 2nd Lieutenant in the Leicestershire Yeomanry, in 1925. When the Second World War began in 1939, he was called up with the Yeomanry and spent two earlier years of the war with the Home Guard.

From 1941 to 1943, Babington Smith served in Africa as financial controller of the newly liberated Italian colonies in East Africa. In 1943, he was recalled to England to serve as an assistant to US Army General Dwight D. Eisenhower at Supreme Headquarters Allied Expeditionary Force (SHAEF). Promoted to Brigadier, Babington Smith was Director of Finance at SHAEF until 1945, tasked with planning the financial aspects of the Allied invasion and subsequent administration of Western Europe.

== Honours ==
In April 1945, Babington Smith was named a Commander of the Order of the British Empire, military division, for his service during the Second World War.

He was also decorated as a Chevalier of the Legion d'Honeur avec Palme and the Croix de Guerre.

== Personal life ==
In 1943, Babington Smith married Jean Mary, daughter of Admiral Hon. Sir Herbert Meade-Fetherstonhaugh and granddaughter of Admiral of the Fleet Richard Meade, 4th Earl of Clanwilliam. They had one son, Alan (born 1946); and two daughters, Louisa (born 1944), wife of James Richard Macfarlane, Coldstream Guards; and Susan (born 1950), wife of John Henry Hemming.

Babington Smith never officially retired, but in later years he suffered from crippling arthritis and was further disabled by a car accident. He died in London in 1984, aged 83.

In 1990, his widow was raised to the rank of an earl's daughter by royal warrant, entitled to be styled as Lady Jean Babington Smith. She died 22 November 2001.

== Ancestry ==
Ancestors of Michael Babington Smith

16. Archibald Smith of Jordanhill
8. James Smith of Jordanhill
17. Isobel Euing
4. Archibald Smith of Jordanhill
18. Alexander Wilson
9. Mary Wilson
19. Christina Lawrie
2. Sir Henry Babington Smith
20. Charles Stuart Parker
10. Sir James Parker
21. Mary Rainey
5. Susan Emma Parker
22. Thomas Babington of Rothley Temple
11. Mary Babington
23. Jean Macaulay
1. Michael Babington Smith
24. Thomas Bruce, 7th Earl of Elgin
12. James Bruce, 8th Earl of Elgin
25. Elizabeth Oswald
6. Victor Bruce, 9th Earl of Elgin
26. John Lambton, 1st Earl of Durham
13. Lady Mary Louisa Lambton
27. Lady Louisa Grey
3. Lady Elisabeth Mary Bruce
28. Sir James Carnegie, 5th Baronet
14. James Carnegie, 9th Earl of Southesk
29. Charlotte Lysons
7. Lady Constance Mary Carnegie
30. Charles Noel, 1st Earl of Gainsborough
15. Lady Catherine Hamilton Noel
31. Arabella Hamlyn-Williams

Honorary titles
| Preceded by Sir George Bolton | High Sheriff of the County of London; 1953–1954 | Succeeded by Geoffrey Eley |
| Preceded by Sir George Bolton | High Sheriff of the County of London; 1962–1963 | Succeeded by Sir Cyril Hawker |
