= Cyril Hawker =

English cricketer and banker

Sir (Frank) Cyril Hawker (21 July 1900 – 22 February 1991) was an English banker and cricketer.

Hawker was born in Epping in 1900, the son of Frank Charles Hawker. He was educated at the City of London School between 1913 and 1919.

== Finance ==
Hawker joined the Bank of England in 1920. Appointed Chief Accountant in 1948, he was given the major task of administering the Bank's major responsibilities in connection with the Government's nationalisation programme. After a period as Adviser to the Governors, he was appointed Executive Director and Member of the Court in 1954. He played a large role in the establishment of the central banks of the newly independent Commonwealth countries.

Hawker left the Bank in 1962 to become Chairman of The Standard Bank Ltd. He was also Chairman of The Bank of West Africa (1965-1973), Union Zaïroise de Banques (1969-1974), The Chartered Bank (1973-1974). After orchestrating its merger in 1969, he then became first chairman of the Standard Chartered Banking Group until 1974.

Amongst his many other roles, he was Deputy Chairman of Midland and International Banks.

== Cricket & Football ==
Hawker was a right-handed batsman who played first-class cricket for Essex. He made a single appearance for Essex during the 1937 season, playing against Lancashire in an innings defeat highlighted by a double-century from Eddie Paynter. Hawker made just 26 runs in the two innings, and was never selected to play for the team again. He had first played cricket for the City of London School XI and was active in club cricket for various sides including Southgate, Old Citizens, the Free Foresters and the Frogs.

He was heavily involved in the running and administration of the game as well, serving as chairman of the Minor Counties Cricket Association before becoming President of Marylebone Cricket Club (MCC) in 1970–1971. The announcement of Hawker's MCC appointment in May 1970 came amid discussion over apartheid South Africa's tour of England in 1970, 'Stop the Seventy Tour' protestors considered it a provocative move by the MCC given Hawker strong links to South Africa through Standard Chartered. He presided over the creation of the Limited Overs International format, which first took place in Melbourne in 1971 during his presidency.

Hawker was a sporting all rounder and was also chairman of the Amateur Football Association (AFA) in 1971. He was Vice-President of the National Playing Fields Association from 1976 until his death, and Hon. Vice-President of the Football Association in 1970.

== Personal life ==
Hawker married Marjorie Ann Pearce (sister of Tom Pearce, cricketer and President of Essex County Cricket Club) in 1931, and had three daughters. He was created a Knight Bachelor in the 1958 New Years Honours List. He was a Member of the Court of the Worshipful Company of Mercers. He was also High Sheriff of the County of London, 1963–1964. He was a member of the Athenaeum Club, London.

Honorary titles
Preceded by Michael Smith	High Sheriff of the County of London; 1963–1964	Succeeded by John Stevens
