= Scio House Hospital =

Coordinates: 51.4472°N 0.2322°W

Scio House Hospital for Officers was a hospital catering for military officers in Putney, London.

== History ==
Scio House was the last villa on Portsmouth Road abutting the heath. It was built and owned by Eustratios Stephanos Ralli, a founder of the Baltic Exchange and a member of the most successful Greek émigré merchant families, the Ralli Brothers of the mid-19th century. Their firm employed more than 40,000 people. They were quick to seize new opportunities created by wars, political events, and the opening of new markets, such as corn, cotton, silk, opium and fruit. Scio House was named after the family's birthplace, the Greek city and island of Chios. Mary Ann Chadwell describes driving "with Mrs Peter Ralli's children to Putney to see the grounds of Mrs E. Ralli. Beautiful views over Wimbledon Common." The mansion eventually became a hospital and was known as Scio House Hospital for Officers, Putney and in 1919 a Colonel Hargreaves was residing in Scio. By 1926 it was known as the British Red Cross Hospital, where serviceman injured in World War I still remained. Former British governor to Singapore Sir John Fearns Nicoll died at Scio in 1981. In the mid-1980s the site was controversially redeveloped as Lynden Gate, a gated community of 70 neo-Georgian homes divided between two streets. Opposition to the planned demolition of Scio House was raised in the House of Lords in 1982 by Lord Jenkins, but the building was ultimately torn down that year. The lily-filled Scio pond remains to this day, south of the Lynden Gate development, near where the now disused portion of the old Portsmouth Road veers towards Roehampton Lane and the A3 junction.
