= Wimbledon Common =

Open space in Wimbledon, London, England

Coordinates: 51°25′47″N 0°14′18″W

- Site of Special Scientific Interest
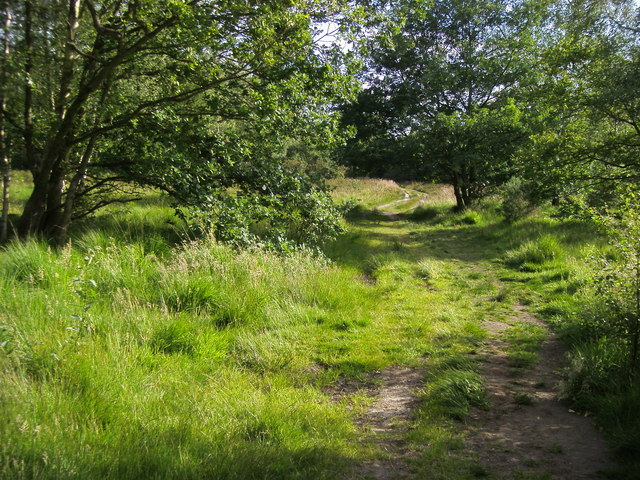
- Location of Wimbledon Common.
- Area of search: Greater London
- Grid reference: TQ227720
- Interest: Biological
- Area: 346.5 ha (856 acres)
- Notification date: 1986
- Location map: Magic Map

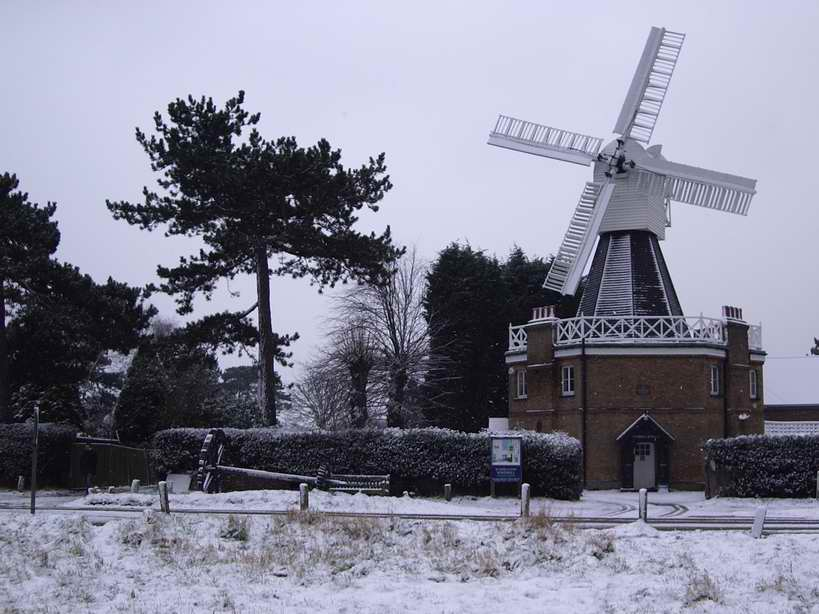
The windmill in February 2005

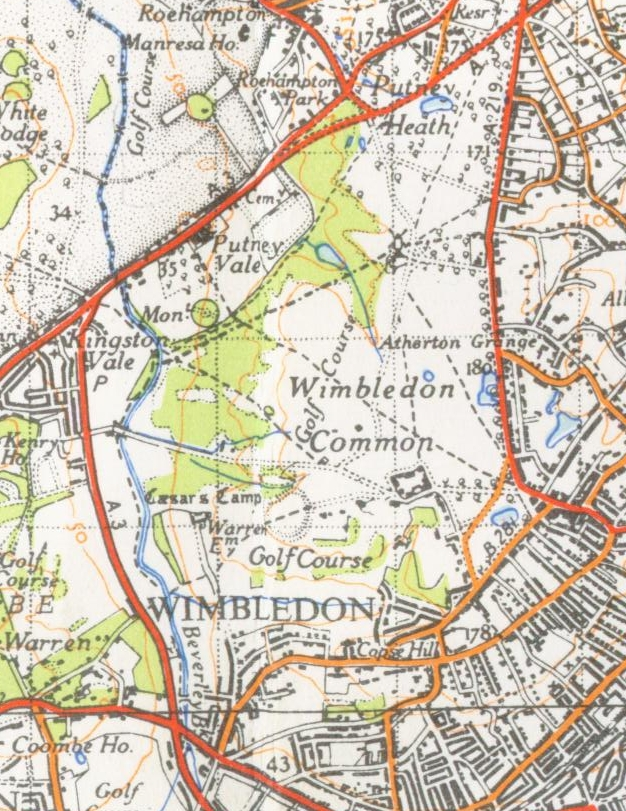
A map from 1944

Wimbledon Common is a large open space in Wimbledon, southwest London. There are three named areas: Wimbledon Common, Putney Heath, and Putney Lower Common, which together are managed under the name Wimbledon and Putney Commons totalling 460 hectares (1,140 acres). Putney Lower Common is set apart from the rest of the Common by a minimum of 1 mile (1.6 kilometres) of the built-up western end of Putney.

== Wimbledon and Putney Commons ==
Wimbledon Common, together with Putney Heath and Putney Lower Common, is protected by the Wimbledon and Putney Commons Act 1871 (34 & 35 Vict. c. cciv) from being enclosed or built upon. The common is for the benefit of the general public for informal recreation, and for the preservation of natural flora and fauna. It is the largest expanse of heathland in London, with an area of bog with a flora that is rare in the region. The western slopes, which lie on London Clay, support mature mixed woodland. The Commons are also an important site for the stag beetle.

Most of the Common is a Site of Special Scientific Interest, and a Special Area of Conservation under the EC Habitats Directive. English Nature works with the Conservators on the management plan for the area. Wimbledon Common and Putney Heath are also a Site of Metropolitan Importance for Nature Conservation.

The Commons are administered by eight Conservators. Five of them are elected triennially and the remaining three are appointed by three government departments: the Department of the Environment, Ministry of Defence and Home Office. The Commons are managed by the Clerk and Ranger, supported by a Deputy, a Wildlife & Conservation Officer and a personal assistant. There are seven Mounted Keepers (who deal with public safety and security), two groundsmen (for the playing fields), six maintenance workers and one property maintenance worker – some 23 employees in total. There are at least four horses which are used by the Keepers on mounted patrol.

The Conservators are responsible for the annual budget of around £1m. Most of the revenue comes from an annual levy on houses within 3/4 mile (1.2 kilometres) of the Commons. The levy payers are entitled to vote for the five elected Conservators. The levy payers fall within three London boroughs: Merton, Wandsworth (which includes Putney) and Kingston.

In 1864, the lord of the manor, Earl Spencer, who owned Wimbledon manor, attempted to pass a private parliamentary bill to enclose the Common for the creation of a new park with a house and gardens and to sell part for building. In a landmark decision for English common land, and following an enquiry, permission was refused and a board of conservators was established in 1871 to take ownership of the common and preserve it in its natural condition.

The windmill stands near the centre of Wimbledon Common as usually understood; in fact the unmarked parish boundary with Putney Common runs right past it (line marked --- on the map). Here Robert Baden-Powell wrote parts of Scouting for Boys, which was published in 1908.

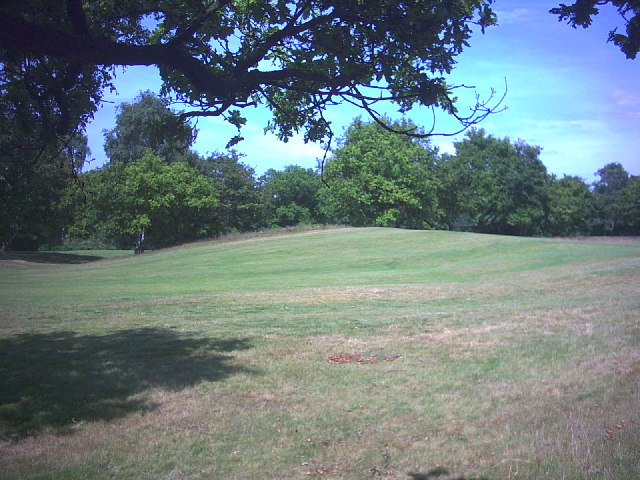
Remains of the ditch between the two main ramparts of the Iron Age hill fort

In the 19th century the windmill was the headquarters of the National Rifle Association and drew large crowds each July for the Imperial Meeting - the Association's National Championship. "These annual gatherings are attended by the élite of fashion, and always include a large number of ladies, who generally evince the greatest interest in the target practice of the various competitors, whether it be for the honour of carrying off the Elcho Shield, the Queen's or the Prince of Wales's Prize, or the shield shot for by our great Public Schools, or the Annual Rifle Match between the Houses of Lords and Commons." The Association left Wimbledon in 1889 as the Meeting outgrew the ranges there, relocating for the 1890 Meeting at a new complex near Bisley, Surrey.

Two broad, shallow pools, Kingsmere and Rushmere, lie near roads on the higher parts of Wimbledon Common and seem to be the result of gravel extraction. The more remote Queensmere is somewhat deeper, being impounded in a small valley. These were often referred to as "Pen Ponds".

Beverley Brook runs along the western edge of Wimbledon Common. The watercourse was the historic south west London boundary, and is paralleled by the Beverley Brook Walk.

Near Beverley Brook and Warren Farm are two Local Nature Reserves managed by the London Wildlife Trust: Farm Bog and Fishpond Wood and Beverley Meads.

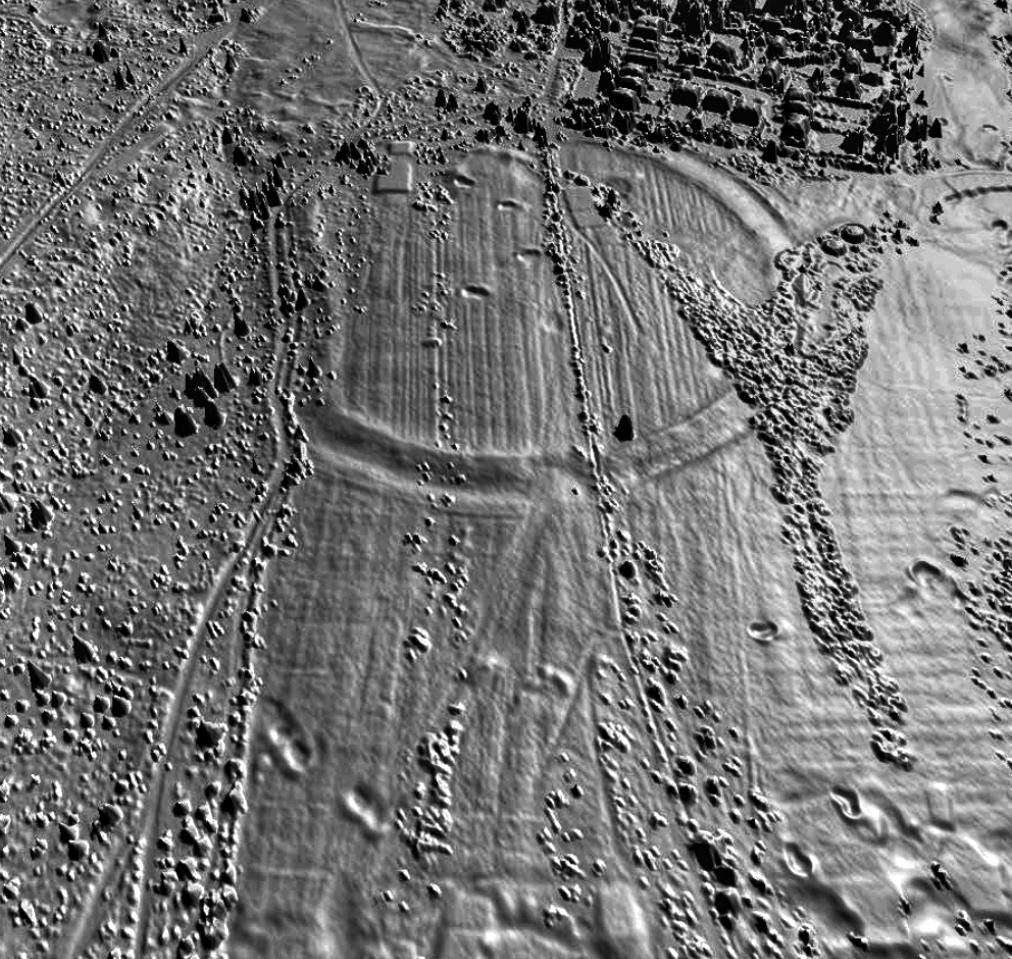
An oblique lidar view of Caesar's Camp hillfort

At the southern end of the common on the part used by the Royal Wimbledon Golf Club, but with a public footpath running through the middle, are the remains of an Iron Age hill fort known (in fact only since the 19th century) as Caesar's Camp. Though the main period of use as an oppidum seems to have been the 6th to 4th centuries BC, there is some evidence that it was indeed stormed by the Romans, probably in the Invasion of Britain by Claudius. It may have been taken by the Legio II Augusta under Vespasian in their push westwards in AD 44. It is possible the site was settled as far back as the Bronze Age, but it and the surrounding barrows were deliberately destroyed by John Erle-Drax in 1875.

During World War One, an area of the common known as The Plain was used as one of ten air bases protecting London. In 1914 and before, model aircraft were flown here.

== Putney Heath ==
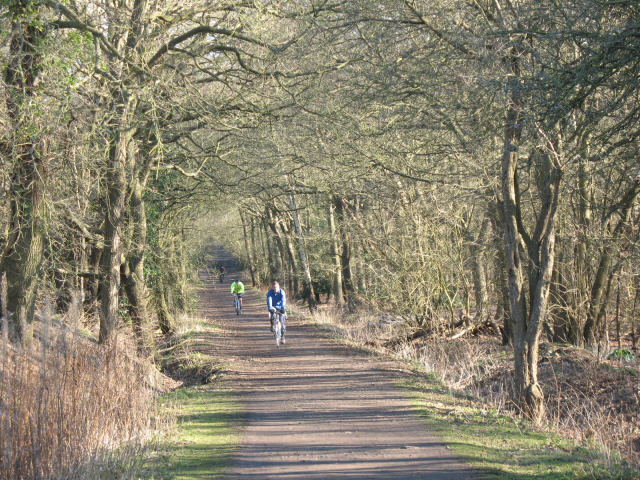
The Horse Ride is a tree tunnel (route overhung by trees) on the western side of Wimbledon Common

Charles II reviewed his forces on Putney Heath in 1684; in May 1767, George III reviewed the Guards, and the Surrey Volunteers at the same spot in 1799. The 300th anniversary of the Queen's Royal Surrey Regiment was marked in 1961 when a tercentenary monument was unveiled and blessed on the heath. According to Samuel Pepys, Charles II and his brother, the Duke of York used to run horses on the heath.

A stone and brick obelisk was erected on Putney Heath in 1770, marking the 110th anniversary of the Great Fire of London, to coincide with the invention of the Hartley fire plates by David Hartley, near a spot where his fireproof house was built. The obelisk, with the ornately detailed foundation stone, is still standing and can be accessed via the car park adjacent to The Telegraph public house, off Wildcroft Road, SW15. The lower part of this house was repeatedly set on fire in the presence, among others, of George III and Queen Charlotte, the members of Parliament, the Lord Mayor, and the Aldermen. Since 1955 the obelisk has been a Grade II listed building. The adjacent Wildcroft Manor was formerly in the ownership of publishing magnate George Newnes, builder of Putney Library. In 1895 he was created a baronet "of Wildcroft, in the parish of Putney, in the county of London".

Many duels were fought on Putney Heath. In May 1652, a duel between George, the third Lord Chandos, and Colonel Henry Compton ended with Compton being killed. On a Sunday afternoon in May 1798 William Pitt, the then Prime Minister, who lived in Bowling-Green House on the heath, fought a bloodless battle with William Tierney, MP. The house derived its name from the bowling-green formerly attached to it, and for more than sixty years (1690–1750) was the most famous green in the neighbourhood of London. "In the early days of George III's reign it was celebrated for its public breakfasts and evening assemblies during the summer season. It was occupied for some time by Archbishop Cornwallis previous to Pitt taking up his residence there. During Pitt's ownership the house had large rooms for public breakfasts and assemblies, was a fashionable place of entertainment". Nearly a century earlier the property was noted for "deep play". Pitt died in the house in 1806 from typhus. It was later owned by Henry Lewis Doulton, son of Henry Doulton of pottery fame. It was demolished and an art deco style residence rebuilt on the site in 1933. Nearby stands Bristol House, which owes its name to the Bristol family. James Macpherson, the translator and author of the Ossian's Poems, had a villa on Putney Heath. The heath near the Telegraph pub was also the venue for the September 1809 duel between Cabinet ministers George Canning and Lord Castlereagh.

Scio House was the last villa on Portsmouth Road abutting the heath: it eventually became a hospital and was known as Scio House Hospital for Officers, Putney. It has since been redeveloped as a gated community of 70 neo-Georgian homes divided into two streets.

Putney Heath is around 160 hectares (400 acres) in size and sits at approximately 45 metres (148 feet) above sea level. Because of its elevation, from 1796 to 1816 Putney Heath hosted a station in the shutter telegraph chain, which connected the Admiralty in London to its naval ships in Portsmouth. This was replaced by a semaphore station, which was part of a semaphore line that operated between 1822 and 1847.

Thomas Cromwell, 1st Earl of Essex, was born on the north side of the heath circa 1485. He became a statesman who served as chief minister of Henry VIII and an agent of Cardinal Wolsey. In the 19th century his birthplace was still a place of note. "The site of Cromwell's birthplace is still pointed out by tradition, and is in some measure confirmed by the survey of Wimbledon Manor... for it describes on that spot 'an ancient cottage called the smith's shop, lying west of the highway from Richmond to Wandsworth, being the sign of the Anchor.' The plot of ground here referred to is now covered by the Green Man public house."

The wilderness was for many years a noted rendezvous for highwaymen. In 1795, the notorious highwayman Jeremiah Abershaw – also known as Jerry Avershaw – was caught in the pub (now owned by Wandsworth brewery Young's,) on the north side of the heath where Putney Hill meets Tibbet's Ride. After Abershaw's execution at Kennington, his body was hung in a chain gibbet on the heath, as a warning to others. The location on the heath is known as Jerry's Hill. It is viewable from the A3 near Putney Vale, slightly uphill from Putney Vale Cemetery where a number of famous people have since been buried or cremated. Abershaw frequented the Bald Face Stag Inn. The inn was later knocked down and became the KLG factory, founded by Kenelm Lee Guinness, part of the famous brewing dynasty and a noted early motor racer before developing highly reliable auto and aero spark plugs. The factory site is now occupied by an Asda supermarket.

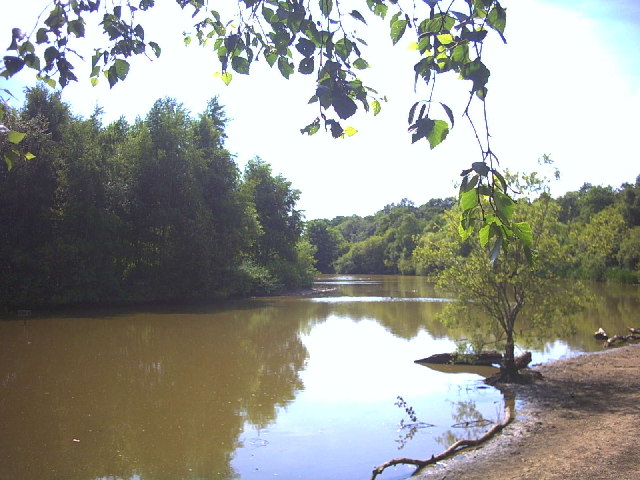
Kingsmere

Above the hill peak of the A3 at Tibbet's Corner – on the A219 towards Putney – stands an ancient wood fence cattle pound opposite the Green Man, adjacent to two huge plane trees near the bus terminus. This simple wood fence structure, used historically to contain lost livestock, has been listed as a Grade II listed structure since 1983. A number of fine homes lined Putney Hill and the north face of the heath, west of the Green Man. All had semi-circular carriageway entrances and exits. These included Grantham House, the residence of Lady Grantham; Ripon House; Ashburton House; and Exeter House, occupied by the second Marquis of Exeter. Grantham House had a large fountain in its grounds between road and residence, while across the road on the heath was a large, shallow rectangular pond used for ice skating. Grantham House stood east of both Exeter and Ashburton houses, on the site of the present-day Hayward Gardens. The skating pond was filled in post-WWII. George Cokayne, author of peerage and baronetage publications, died at Exeter House in 1911. Nearby Gifford House was owned by J. D. Charrington of brewing fame; and Dover House was the seat originally of Lord Dover, afterwards of Lord Clifden.

With the development of transport routes for the growing financial sector, Putney Heath became highly desirable for City gentlemen in the 1890s, and they were initially known as "outsiders". Dover House was owned at the turn of the 20th century by the famous US financier J. P. Morgan. Social researcher Charles Booth classified the whole area of Putney Hill and West Hill, leading into Putney Heath, as wealthy or well-to-do. Despite a full array of places of worship, he said the area was noted for low church attendance with all denominations "struggling for the souls of pleasure-seeking Putney ... the middle class here are as indifferent as the poor elsewhere."

At the top of Putney Hill, the road taking that name veers off Tibbet's Ride at Putney Heath Lane (which was formerly known as Cut-Through Lane). Seven grand homes once lined the east side of this part of Putney Hill. It is now a no-through-road leading to Tibbet's Corner. Several of the mansions remain. The most southern of the homes was named Bath House, which included a keeper's lodge and large grounds. In 1926 it was opened as the Ross Institute and Hospital for Tropical Diseases by the then Prince of Wales, the future Edward VIII. The hospital was founded by malariologist Ronald Ross, who discovered that malaria was transmitted by mosquitoes. He won the 1902 Nobel Prize for his discovery. After his death and burial at nearby Putney Vale Cemetery in 1932, the financially strapped hospital was incorporated into the London School of Hygiene & Tropical Medicine in Keppel Street, central London. Bath House was later demolished and mansion flats built on the property. In memory of its history the block was named Ross Court. Within the grounds remains an older dwelling named Ross Cottage.

The village green at the corner of Wildcroft and Telegraph roads is still used by Roehampton Cricket Club, established in 1842. The club has played there continuously since 1859 when the lord of the manor, Earl Spencer, suggested it as a new site. It has two teams in the highly competitive Fullers Surrey County League and a Sunday side that plays on a more social level. In 1900, a decade after the death of his multimillionaire father Junius Morgan, J. P. Morgan had already gained a fondness for the sport and was made an honorary member. Antarctic explorer Sir Ernest Shackleton, who presided at the club dinner in 1910, allowed his two young children – Raymond and Cecily – to play cowboys and Indians on the cricket green during the week. This groundkeeper's transgression was later believed to have been a privilege of him being an honorary member.

The Chelsea Water Company originally owned the reservoir site and allowed construction of the club pavilion on its property. The covered reservoir is now owned by Thames Water. Cricket matches continued during the war although some games started late or were drawn due to late starts or air raid sirens. Four German V-1 flying bombs struck the area in World War II. One destroyed the club's pavilion, opposite the Telegraph pub, in July 1944, near the reservoir. Wildcroft Road, turning into Portsmouth Road and further along into the future A3, was the main thoroughfare into SW London and became a stop-off point for American serviceman who alighted from their jeeps to "taste this crazy cricket game".

On the south side of the reservoir, in the triangle of land between Wildcroft Road, Tibbet's Ride and the Green Man, is a large clearing of land. A funfair is set up on the grounds each October, lasting for one week. Ground rent is paid by the touring company to the Wimbledon and Putney Commons Conservators, as part of the income of the charity.

== Sports and recreation ==
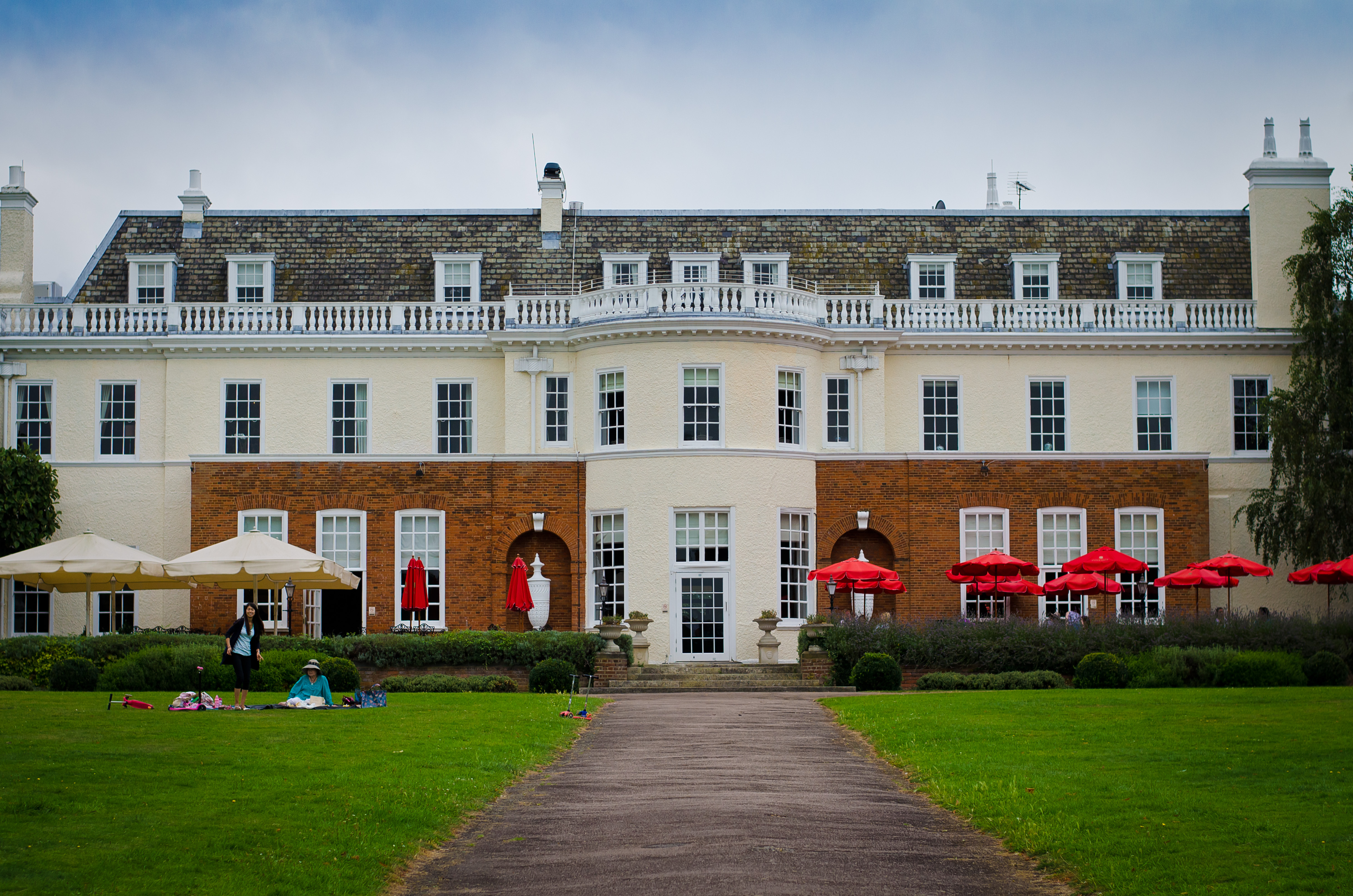
Cannizaro House, now a hotel opposite Wimbledon Common

In August 1730 a cricket match between Putney and Fulham was played, reportedly for "50 guineas per side". It is the only known instance of a team called Putney and of a match at this venue.

Old Central School, situated in the south west of Wimbledon Common, provided a former pupils football team in the late 19th century which played on the common and used the "Fox and Grapes" public house as a changing room. At first called "The Old Centrals", this club later became Wimbledon F.C.

Putney Lower Common hosted Fulham F.C.'s home games in the 1885–1886 season.

The Richardson Evans Memorial Playing Fields, which form part of the Commons and are situated in Kingston Vale, provide football and rugby pitches for local schools and clubs. The grounds are currently home to London Cornish RFC, and was the training ground for Harlequins RL. It also hosts the annual National Schools Sevens rugby tournament. The grounds can also accommodate many different sports such as Australian rules football and Ultimate Frisbee.

Hampton and Richmond Borough Juniors FC (Colts section of Hampton & Richmond Borough of the Conference South League) play their home matches at the Richmond Park entrance/Robin Hood roundabout corner of the common on Sunday mornings.

A Parkrun is held on the common every Saturday morning which usually sees in excess of 300 runners complete 5 kilometres. The course starts and finishes at the Windmill.

Today, as well as being a popular place for cycling, jogging and walking, the Common is home to The Wimbledon Common Golf Club and London Scottish Golf Club. The first University Golf Match was played on Wimbledon Common in 1878, courtesy of the LSGC. It also is the base for Thames Hare and Hounds, the oldest cross country running club in the world. Annually Thames Hare and Hounds host the 1st team (Blues) Varsity cross-country match between Oxford and Cambridge Universities.

The Commons also provide some 16 miles of horse rides.

== Legal disputes ==
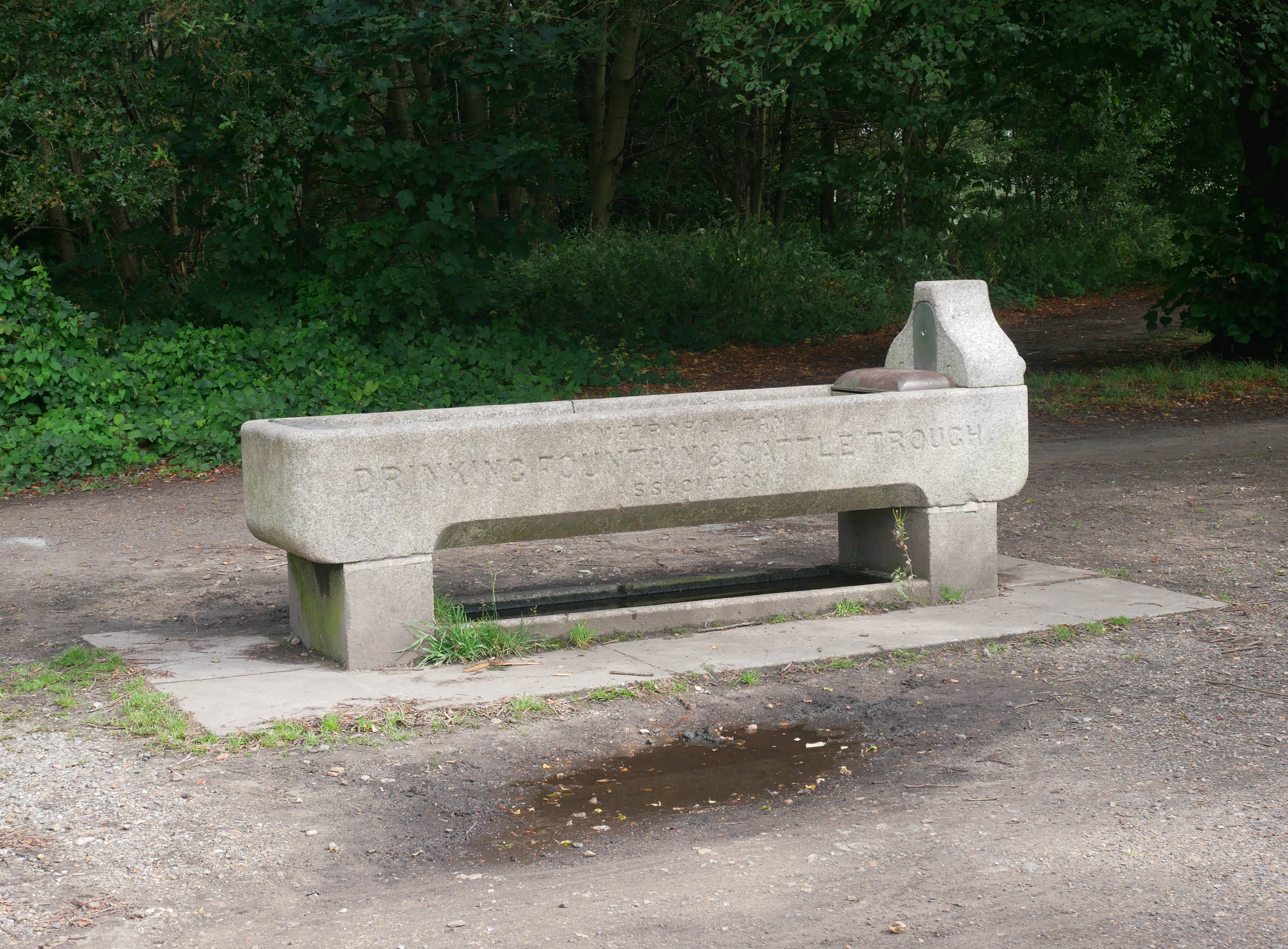
The Metropolitan Drinking Fountain and Cattle Trough Association trough on Wimbledon Common, now Grade II listed

In early 2012 the Wimbledon and Putney Commons Conservators agreed to sell the access rights across Putney Common to Wandsworth Council, having been threatened with a Compulsory Purchase Order if they refused. Without public consultation the Conservators entered into legal agreements, in return for a payment of £350,000. Some local residents who objected to the sale of the access and loss of common to facilitate what they saw as an unattractive and over-intensive development challenged the sale in the High Court, which ruled that the Conservators had not acted beyond their powers.

Some local residents also objected to Wandsworth's planning permissions for the site (where Wandsworth were both the applicant and planning authority), and two permissions were quashed by the High Court in early 2013 over technicalities. The technicalities were corrected and the planning permission subsequently re-obtained. The residents made a public appeal to fund their legal challenge, raising £25,000 from a few dozen donors. The Wimbledon and Putney Commons Conservators joined forces legally with Wandsworth, appointing Wandsworth to build the roads.

The land sold by the Conservators to the council will be tarmacked for some 110 metres (120 yards), and lined with bollards, in addition to street lighting, tarmacked footpaths and electronic barriers, which objectors say will suburbanise and alter the natural state of the Common. The Conservators refused the sustainable transport charity Sustrans permission to upgrade an adjacent path to a cycle path on the grounds that it would "alter the natural state of the commons". The Open Spaces Society gave financial support to the residents in taking the case to the Court of Appeal, saying in December 2013: "This is a unique green lung, which the society helped to save back in the 1870s. We are not prepared to stand by and see it destroyed now."

In August 2016 the Charity Commission announced a Statutory Inquiry into the potential loss due to granting of an easement for access rights to Putney Lower Common.

In July 2020, nearly four years after the Inquiry commenced, the Charity Commission published the results of their Statutory Inquiry, concluding that the easement may have been transferred at an undervalue. Charity Commission Statutory Inquiry Conclusion

On 4 August 2020, The Times newspaper published an article suggesting that the Charity Commission's Statutory Inquiry was a whitewash, as criticism of the deal and trustees was removed when the report was challenged by lawyers acting for Sir Ian Andrews. In the article the Labour MP Dame Margaret Hodge questioned whether the commission was 'fit for purpose', due to the changes. Putney's MP, Fleur Anderson described the report as a 'whitewash'.

== Keepers ==
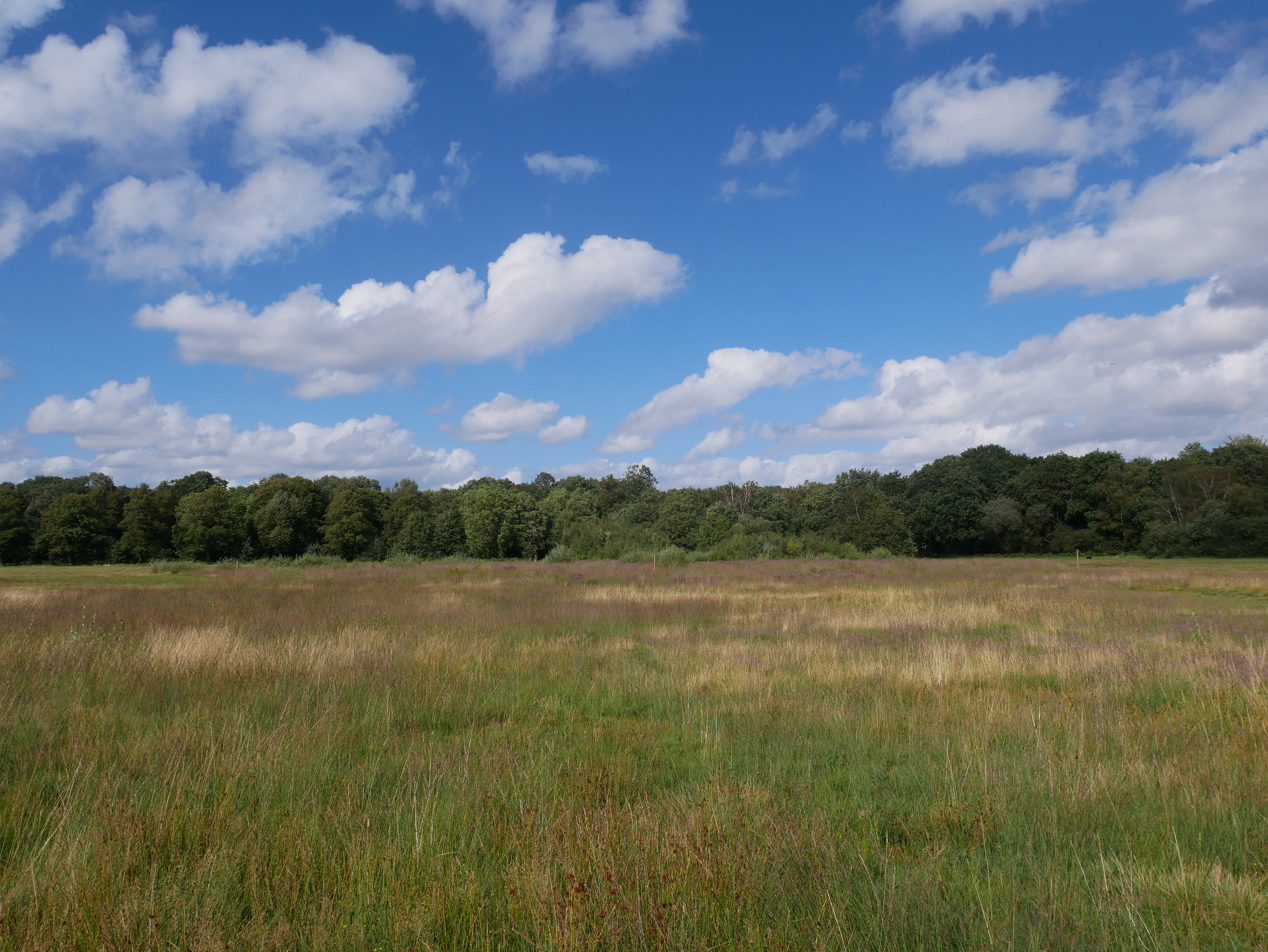
The Plain, an open area on the east side of Wimbledon Common

The Wimbledon and Putney Commons Act 1871 contains a provision to allow the Conservators to have Officers attested as constables for the purposes of enforcing the provisions of the Act and all bylaws made there under.

There was resistance at the time to a similar provision in the draft Bill that preceded the Act, whereby an article in The Spectator in January 1865 objected to the creation of 'Spencerian Police'. The article refers to draft Bill as it was published in draft in 1864, whereby the article suggests that the Bill contained a provision for the appointment of Special Constables with full police powers. It would seem that this provision was removed in favour of the provision that allowed the attestation of constables just for the purposes of enforcing the Act itself and the byelaws made there under.

In addition to the ability to swear in constables, the Act creates a power of arrest for any officer of the Conservators or a constable when the details of a person suspected of committing a byelaws offences cannot be obtained (e.g. details refused or suspected of being false). Whilst it is unlikely that this power would be used by anyone other than a Keeper in modern times, a theoretical power of arrest exists for any staff and for any member or the public that they call upon for assistance.

The historic role of the Keeper was captured in a 1959 British Pathé film, which showed them dressed in bowler hats and tweeds being inspected by the Warden (a former Lieutenant Colonel) before going about their daily routine of tackling summer fires and challenging golfers who were not in appropriate attire.

== Photo gallery ==
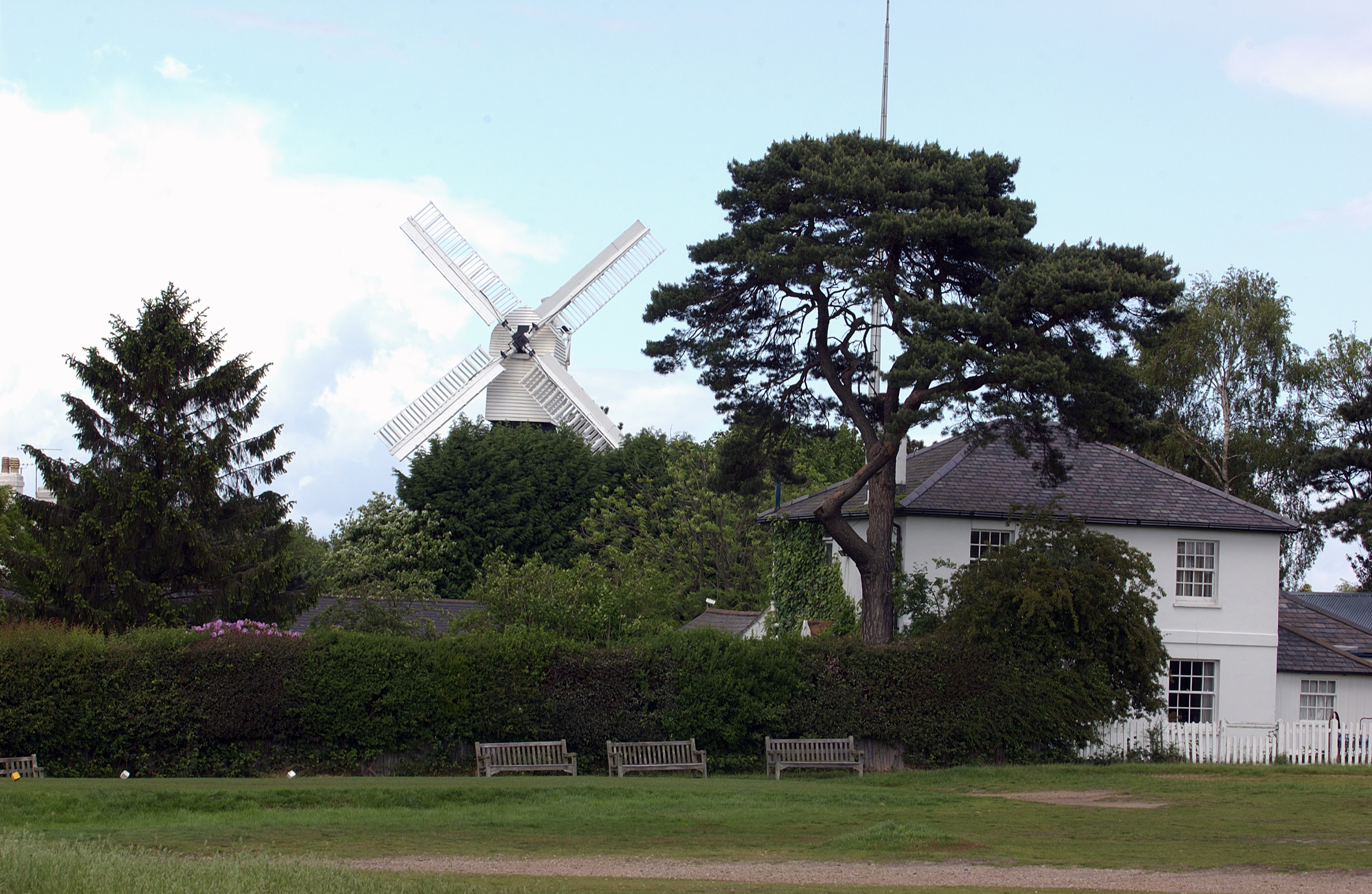
Windmill & Ranger's Office

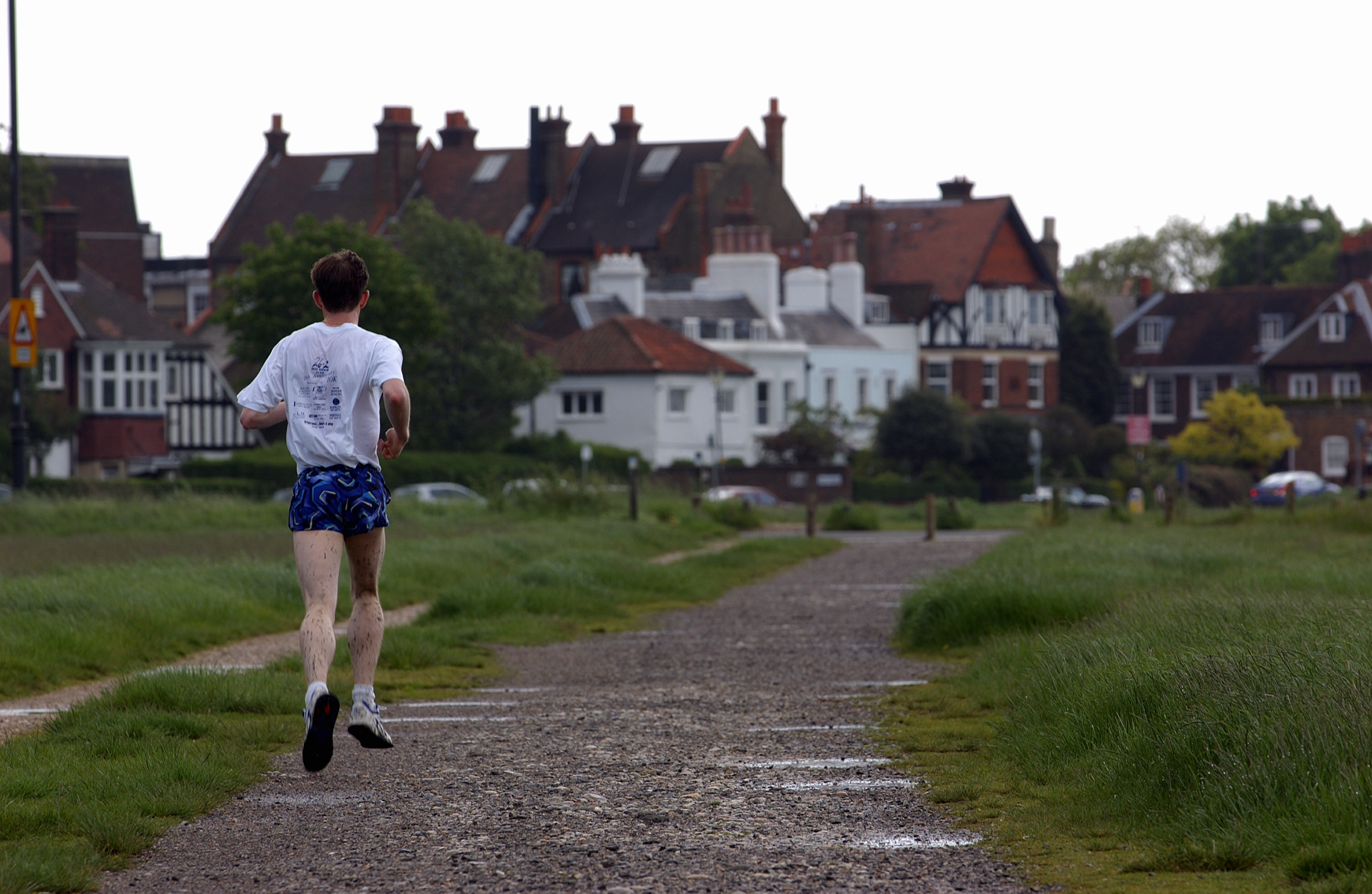
An athlete from Belgrave Harriers trains near Rushmere

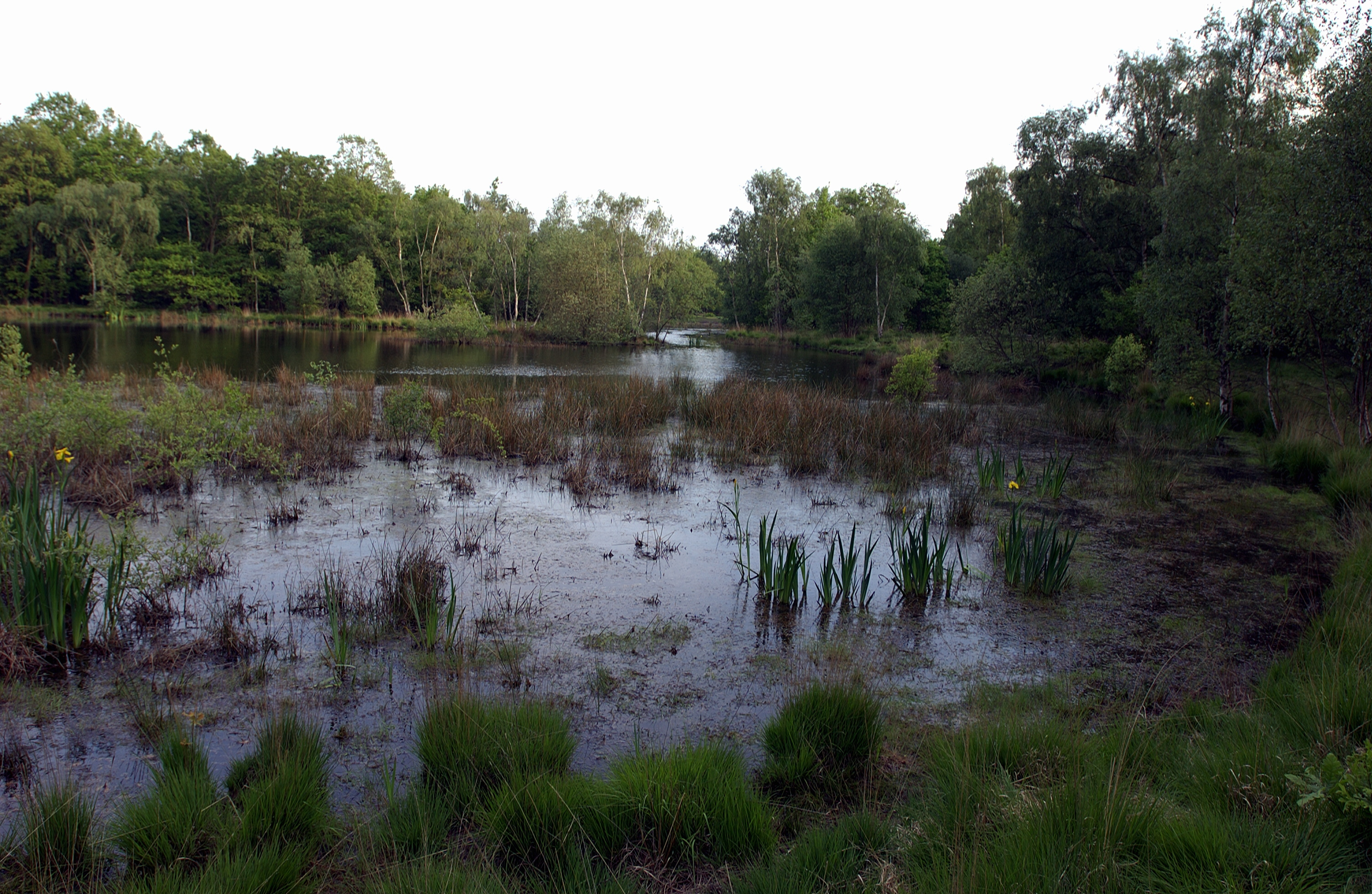
Bluegate Pond

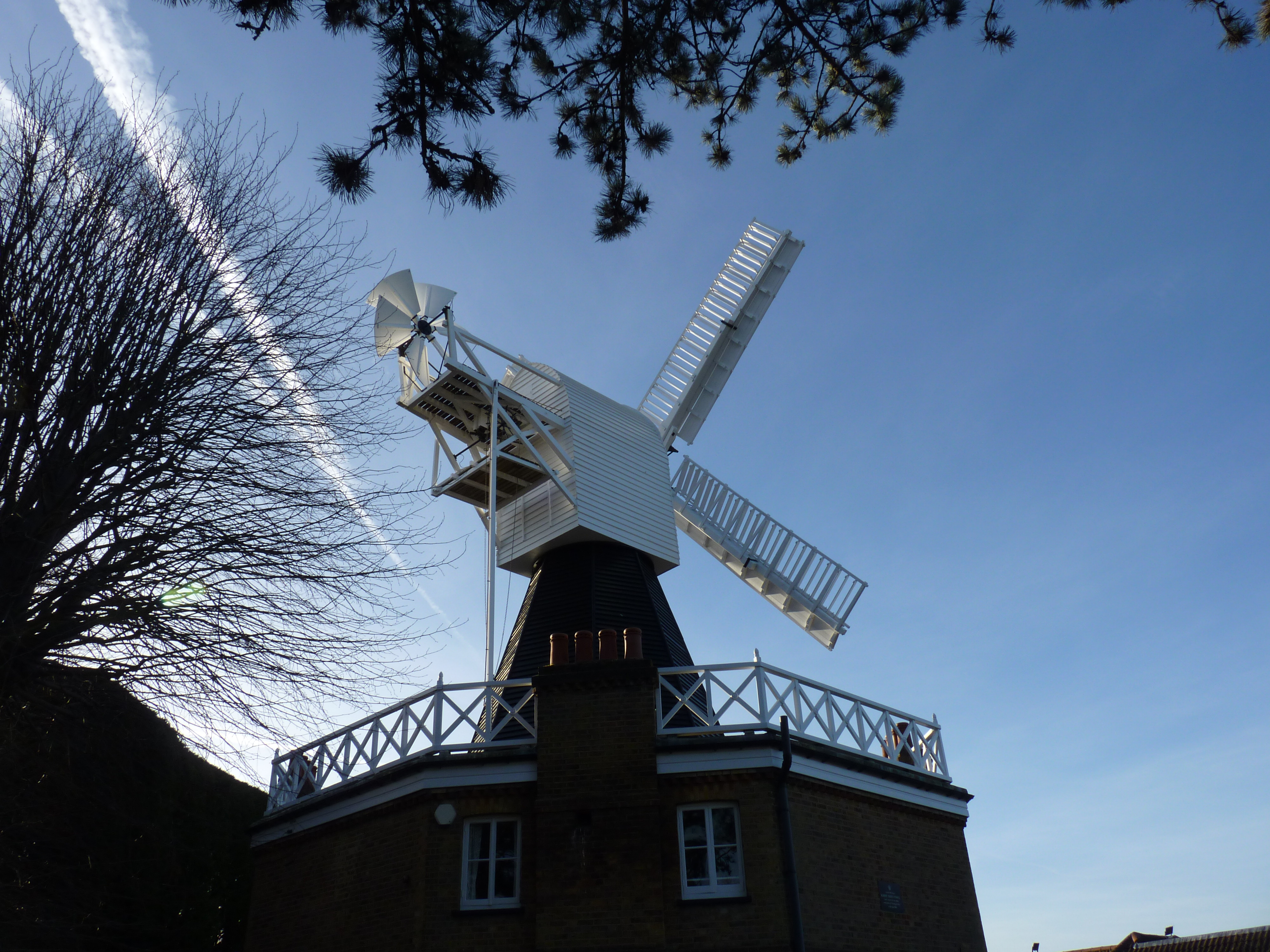
Windmill

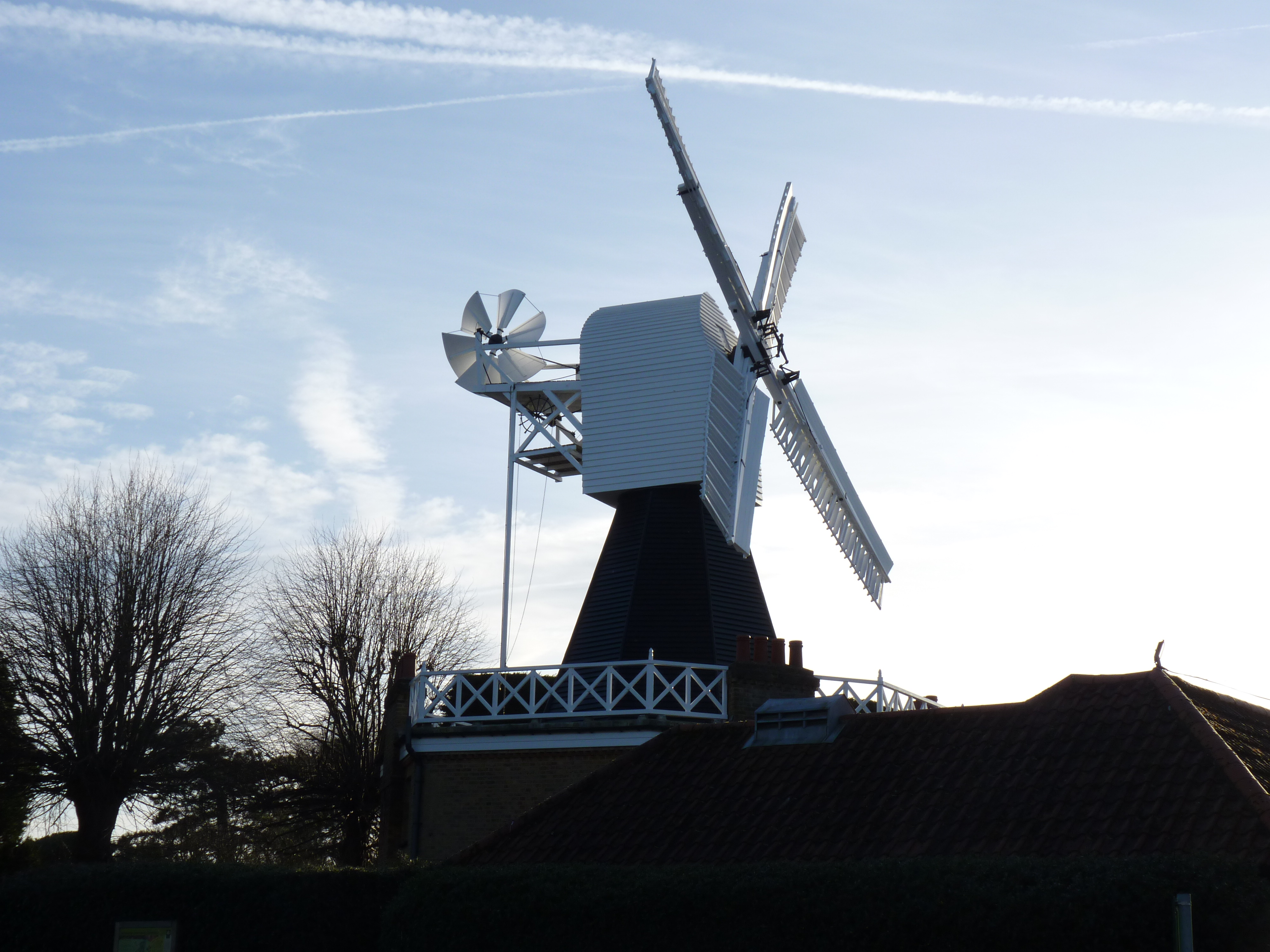
Windmill

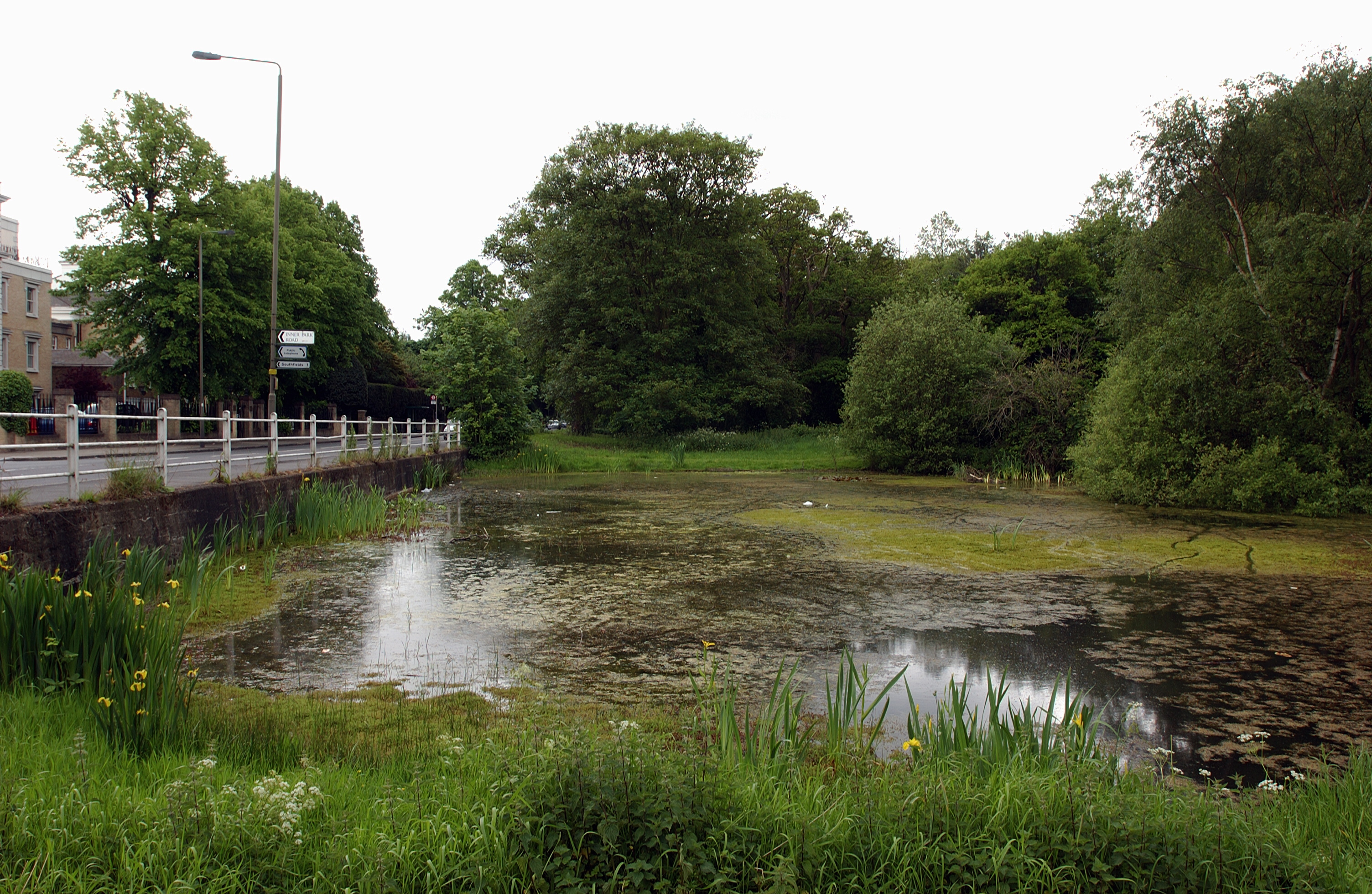
Seven Post Pond

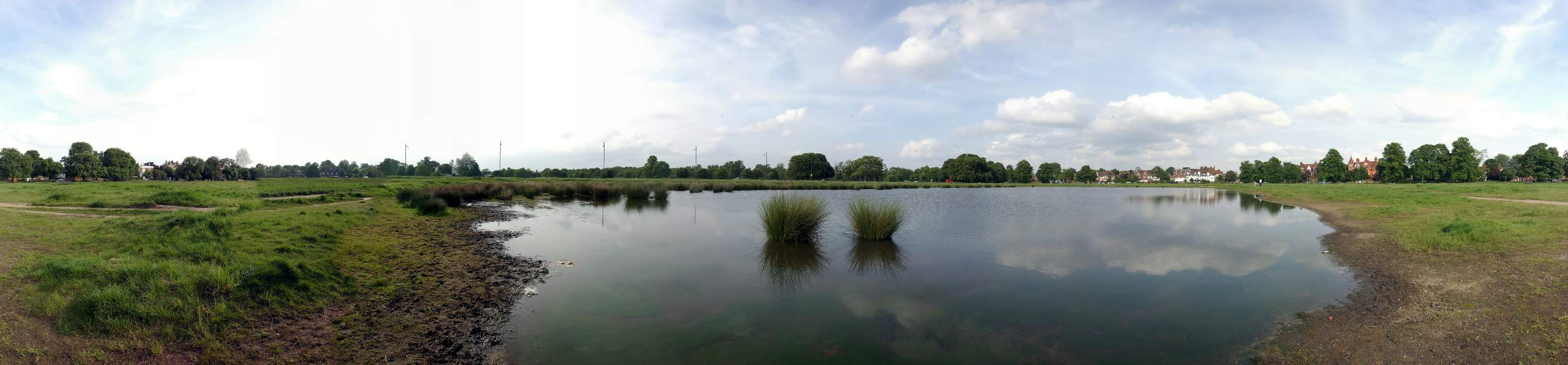
Rushmere Pond

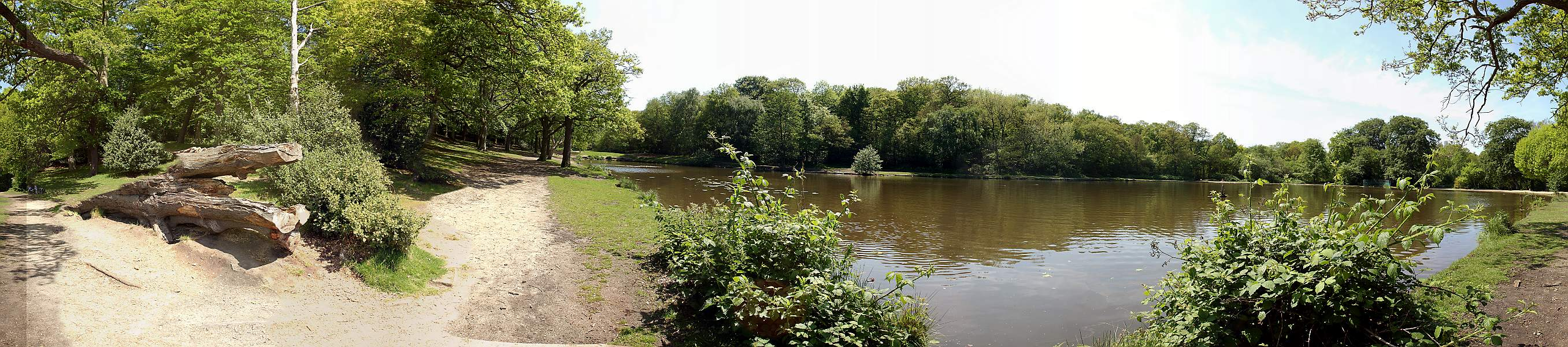
Queensmere

== See also ==
- Wimbledon Manor House
- List of Sites of Special Scientific Interest in Greater London
- The Wombles
- Killing of Rachel Nickell, 1992 sexual assault and murder on Wimbledon Common

Next station upwards	Admiralty Shutter telegraph line 1795	Next station downwards
Chelsea Royal Hospital	Putney Heath	Cabbage Hill

Next station upwards	Admiralty Semaphore line 1822	Next station downwards
Chelsea Royal Hospital	Putney Heath	Coombe Warren
