= Anna Bates =

Anna Bates may refer to:

- Anna Haining Bates (1846–1888), Canadian woman famed for her great height
- Anna Bates (bowls), Zimbabwean lawn bowler
- Anna Bates (Downton Abbey), fictional character

== See also ==
- Ann Bates (c. 1748–c. 1801), loyalist spy during the American Revolution
- Anna Bateson, English suffragist
  - Anna Bateson (botanist), her daughter
