= Clackson =

Clackson is a surname. Notable people with the surname include:

- Chris Clackson (born 1987), American ice hockey player
- James Clackson (born 1966), British linguist
- Colin Clackson (born 1958),

Canadian federal judge

- Kim Clackson (born 1955), Canadian ice hockey player
- Terry Clackson (born 1953),

Canadian federal judge

- Matt Clackson (born 1985), Canadian-born American ice hockey player
- Sarah Clackson (1965–2003), British Coptologist
- William Clackson (c.1799–?), Scottish shoemaker and revolutionary
