= Mary Bateson =

Mary Bateson may refer to:

- Mary Catherine Bateson (1939–2021), American writer and cultural anthropologist
- Mary Bateson (historian) (1865–1906), her great-aunt, British historian and suffrage activist
