= Stanley Stubbs =

Stanley Stubbs may refer to:

- Stanley Stubbs (headmaster)
- Stanley Stubbs (baseball)
