= Michael Ramsey =

Archbishop of Canterbury from 1961 to 1974

The Most Reverend and Right Honourable Lord Ramsey of Canterbury PC
- Archbishop of Canterbury
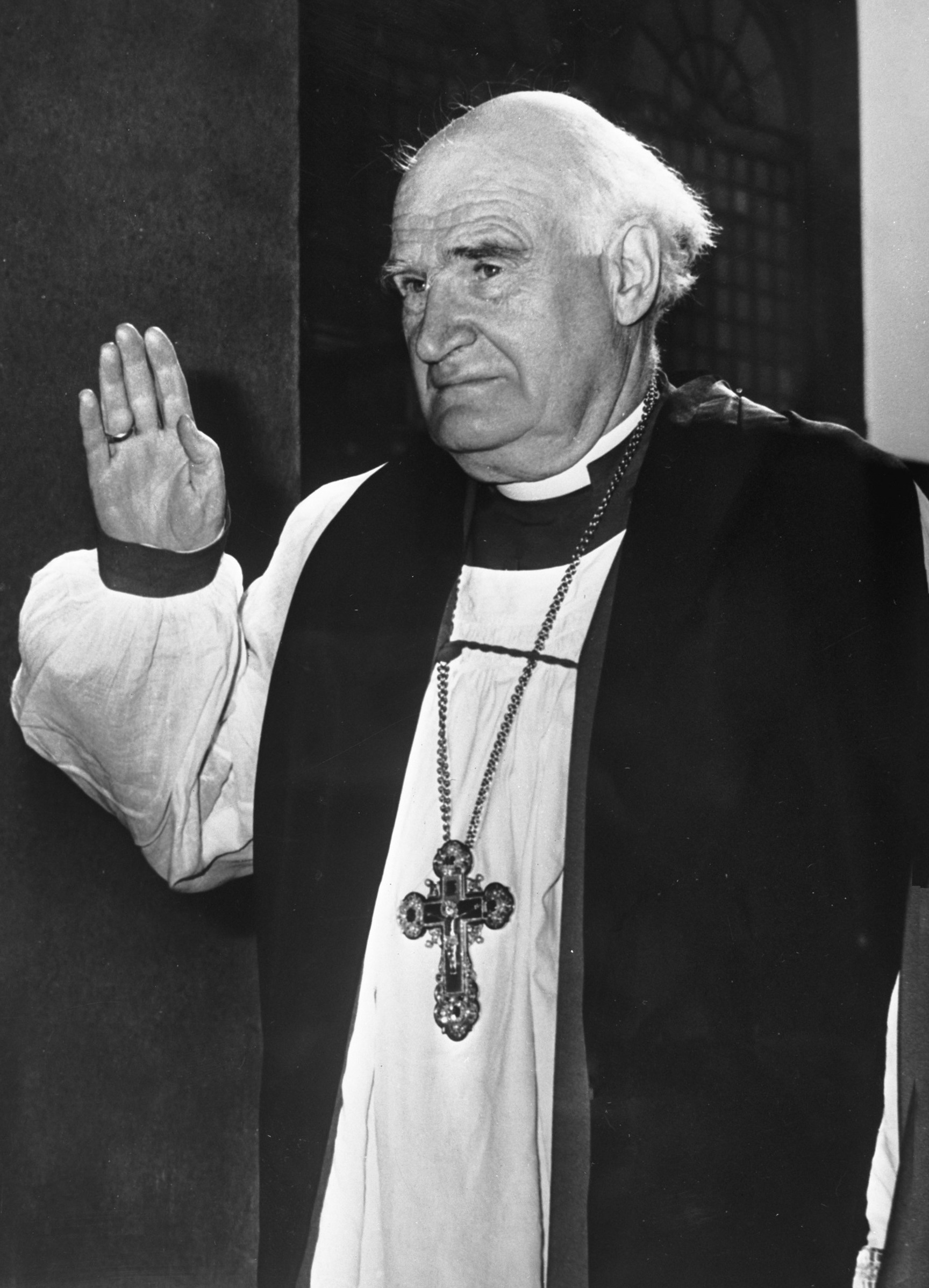
- Ramsey in 1974
- Church: Church of England
- Diocese: Canterbury
- Appointed: 31 May 1961
- In office: 1961–1974
- Predecessor: Geoffrey Fisher
- Successor: Donald Coggan
- Other post: Primate of All England
- Previous posts: Bishop of Durham (1952–1956); Archbishop of York (1956–1961)

Orders
- Ordination: 23 September 1928 (deacon); 22 September 1929 (priest) by Albert David
- Consecration: 29 September 1952 (bishop) by Cyril Garbett

Personal details
- Born: Arthur Michael Ramsey; 14 November 1904 Cambridge, Cambridgeshire, England
- Died: 23 April 1988 (aged 83) Oxford, Oxfordshire, England
- Buried: Canterbury Cathedral
- Denomination: Anglican
- Parents: Arthur Stanley Ramsey
- Spouse: Joan A. C. Hamilton
- Education: Magdalene College, Cambridge
- Signature: Lord Ramsey of Canterbury's signature

Member of the House of Lords
- Lord Temporal
- Life peerage 18 November 1974 – 23 April 1988
- Lord Spiritual
- In office 12 November 1952 – 15 November 1974

Arthur Michael Ramsey, Baron Ramsey of Canterbury (14 November 1904 – 23 April 1988), was a British Anglican bishop and life peer. He served as the 100th Archbishop of Canterbury in the Church of England. He was appointed on 31 May 1961 and held the office until 1974, having previously been appointed Bishop of Durham in 1952 and the Archbishop of York in 1956.

He was known as a theologian, educator, and advocate of Christian unity.

== Early life ==
Ramsey was born in Cambridge, England, in 1904. His parents were Arthur Stanley Ramsey (1867–1954) and Mary Agnes Ramsey née Wilson (1875–1927); his father was a Congregationalist and mathematician and his mother was a socialist and suffragist. He was educated at Sandroyd School, at the time based in the large village of Cobham in Surrey (now near the village of Tollard Royal in Wiltshire), followed by King's College School, Cambridge, Repton School (where the headmaster was a future Archbishop of Canterbury, Geoffrey Francis Fisher) and Magdalene College, Cambridge, where his father was president of the college. At university he was president of the Cambridge Union Society and his support for the Liberal Party won him praise from H. H. Asquith.

Ramsey's elder brother, Frank P. Ramsey (1903–1930), was a mathematician and philosopher (of atheist convictions). He was something of a prodigy who, when only 19, translated Wittgenstein's Tractatus into English.

During his time in Cambridge, Ramsey came under the influence of the Anglo-Catholic dean of Corpus Christi College, Edwyn Clement Hoskyns. On the advice of Eric Milner-White he trained at Cuddesdon, where he became friends with Austin Farrer and was introduced to Orthodox Christian ideas by Derwas Chitty. He graduated in 1927 with a first-class degree in theology.

== Ordained ministry ==
Ramsey was ordained in 1928 and became a curate in Liverpool, where he was influenced by Charles Raven.

After this he became a lecturer to ordination candidates at the Bishop's Hostel in Lincoln. During this time he published a book, The Gospel and the Catholic Church (1936). He then ministered at St Botolph's Church, Boston and at St Bene't's Church, Cambridge, before being offered the Van Mildert Chair of Divinity in the Department of Theology at Durham University, and a canonry at Durham Cathedral. After this, in 1950, he became the Regius Professor of Divinity at Cambridge, but left to become a bishop after only a short time in office.

Ramsey married Joan A. C. Hamilton (1909–1995) at Durham in the early summer of 1942.

=== Episcopal ministry ===
In 1952, he was appointed Bishop of Durham. He was consecrated a bishop by Cyril Garbett, Archbishop of York, at York Minster on Michaelmas (29 September) that year (by which his election to the See of Durham must have already been confirmed). In 1956 he became Archbishop of York and, in 1961, Archbishop of Canterbury. During his time as archbishop he travelled widely and saw the creation of the General Synod. Retirement ages for clergy were cut from 75 to 70.

== Theology and churchmanship ==
Ramsey’s "life was rooted in prayer, worship and a sense of the reality of God, yet this was all tempered with a sense of humour which prevented it from ever degenerating into pomposity or unreal pietism. This spiritual depth was just as important for his leadership in an unsettled time as was his intellectual and theological power."

In a lecture on Ramsey, John Macquarrie asked, "what kind of theologian was he?" and answered that "he was thoroughly Anglican". Macquarrie explained that Ramsey's theology is (1) "based on the scriptures", (2) the church's "tradition", and (3) "reason and conscience". Ramsey held to the Anglo-Catholic tradition, but he appreciated other points of view. This was especially true after he became a bishop who ministered to diverse Anglicans.

As an Anglo-Catholic with a nonconformist background, Ramsey had a broad religious outlook. He had a particular regard for the Eastern Orthodox concept of "glory", and his favourite book he had written was his 1949 work The Transfiguration.

Ramsey's first reaction to J. A. T. Robinson's Honest to God (1963) was hostile. However, he soon published a short response entitled Image Old and New, in which he engaged seriously with Robinson's ideas.

Conscious always of the atheism which his short-lived brother Frank had espoused, he maintained a lifelong respect for honest unbelief, and considered that such unbelief would not automatically be a barrier to salvation. Acting on his respect for beliefs other than his, Ramsey made a barefoot visit to the grave of Mahatma Gandhi.

Although he disagreed with a lot of Karl Barth's thinking, his relations with him were warm.

Following observations of a religious mission at Cambridge, he had an early dislike of evangelists and mass rallies, which he feared relied too much on emotion. This led him to be critical of Billy Graham, although the two later became friends and Ramsey even took to the stage at a Graham rally in Rio de Janeiro. One of his later books, The Charismatic Christ (1973), engaged with the charismatic movement.

Ramsey believed there was no decisive theological argument against women priests, although he was not entirely comfortable with this development. The first women priests in the Anglican Communion were ordained during his time as Archbishop of Canterbury. In retirement he received communion from a woman priest in the United States.

== Ecumenical activities ==
Ramsey was active in the ecumenical movement, and while Archbishop of Canterbury in 1966 he met Pope Paul VI in Rome, where the Pope presented him with the episcopal (bishop's) ring he had worn as Archbishop of Milan. The two prelates issued "The Common Declaration by Pope Paul VI and the Archbishop of Canterbury Dr Michael Ramsey". In it they said that their meeting "marks a new stage in the development of fraternal relations, based upon Christian charity, and of sincere efforts to remove the causes of conflict and to re-establish unity."

Ramsey preached at the Roman Catholic St Patrick's Cathedral in New York City in 1972. It was the first time that a leader of the Anglican Communion had done so. However, while fostering ties with the Roman Catholic Church, Ramsey criticised the Pope's 1968 encyclical Humanae Vitae against birth control.

These warm relations with Rome caused Ramsey to be dogged by protests by fundamentalist Protestants, particularly Ian Paisley.

Ramsey encouraged efforts to promote closer relations between Anglicans and Orthodox. He enjoyed friendship with the Orthodox Patriarch of Constantinople, Athenagoras, and Alexius, Patriarch of Moscow.

As Archbishop of Canterbury, Ramsey served as president of the World Council of Churches (1961–68). However, he opposed the granting of aid money by the World Council of Churches to guerrilla groups.

Ramsey's willingness to talk to officially sanctioned churches in the Eastern Bloc led to criticisms from Richard Wurmbrand.

He also supported efforts to unite the Church of England with the Methodist Church and was disappointed when the plans fell through.

== Politics ==
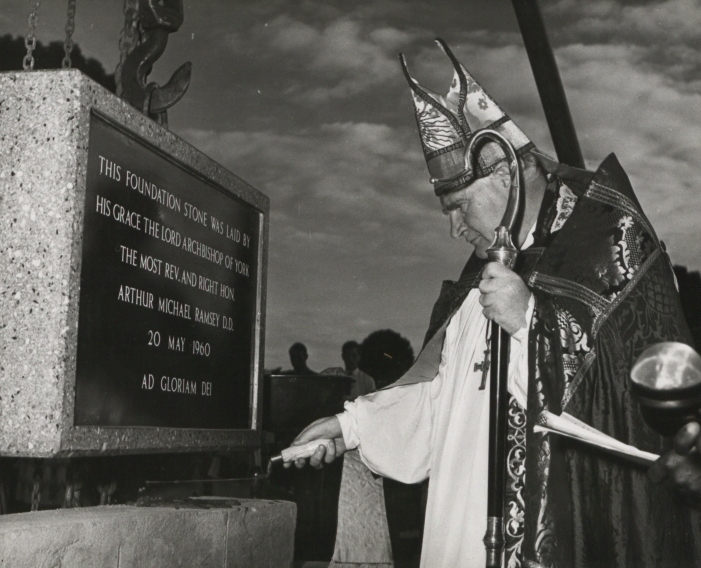
Ramsey laying the foundation stone of the Church of All Saints in Dar es Salaam

Before entering the clergy, Michael Ramsey had participated in the Liberal Party. In 1925, Ramsey travelled with the debate club and spoke at multiple venues in the United States. Upon his return, he heard Lord Hugh Cecil remark that the Church was the place to go for those who wanted to help people, and Ramsey heard that as his vocation from God. He had sympathies with liberal politics for the rest of his life and admired H. H. Asquith. He became close friends with party leader Jeremy Thorpe. Ramsey and his wife Joan were godparents of Thorpe's son Rupert, whom Ramsey baptized in 1969, and Ramsey officiated at Thorpe's second marriage to Marion Stein. Both Ramsey and Thorpe had lost family members to car collisions: Ramsey's mother in 1927 and Thorpe's first wife Caroline in 1970.

Ramsey disliked the power of the government over the church. "Establishment has never been one of my enthusiasms," he said, and "he was not at ease with the royal family." He supported the decriminalisation of homosexuality in the 1960s, which brought him enemies in the House of Lords.

In 1965, "he outraged right-wingers when he declared that under certain circumstances, there would be Christian justice in using British troops to overthrow the white-minority regime [of Ian Smith] in Rhodesia." He also called the Vietnam War a "futility". Regarding Africa, Ramsey opposed curbs on immigration to the UK of Kenyan Asians, which he saw as a betrayal by Britain of a promise. He was against apartheid, and he left an account of a very frosty encounter with John Vorster. In 1970, Ramsey attacked apartheid, saying that it was "being increased by more ruthless actions” and describing it as an "abuse of power at the expense of others". He was also a critic of the Chilean dictator Augusto Pinochet.

== Later life ==
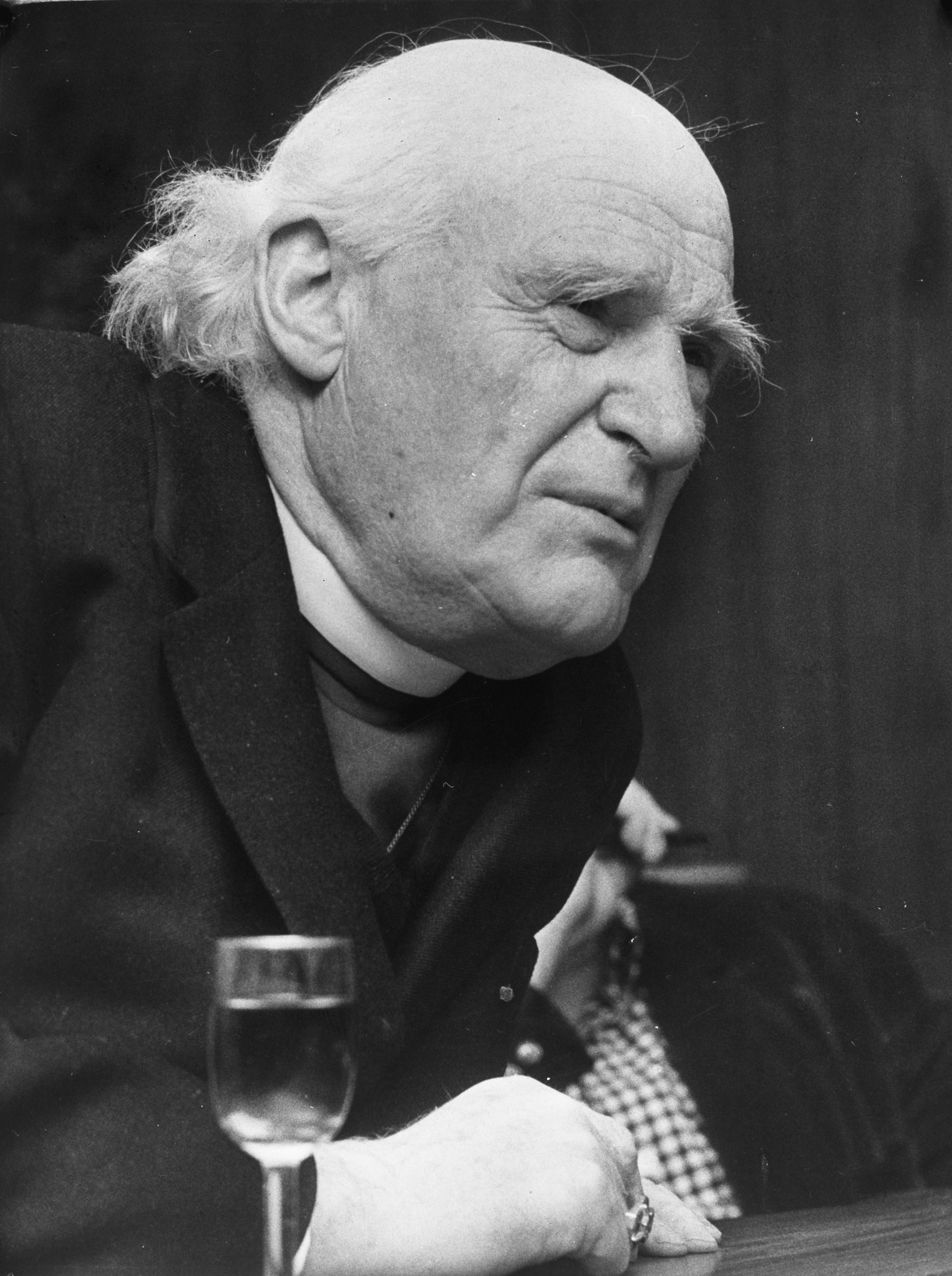
Michael Ramsey in 1974

After retiring as Archbishop of Canterbury on 15 November 1974 he was created a life peer three days later, as Baron Ramsey of Canterbury, of Canterbury in Kent, enabling him to remain in the House of Lords where he had previously sat as one of the Lords Spiritual.

Although retired, Ramsey remained active, "a fact reflected in his writing of four books and numerous additional undertakings".

He went to live first at Cuddesdon, where he did not settle particularly well, and then for a number of years back in Durham, where he was regularly seen slowly making his way through the cathedral, and talking to students. A benevolent and popular figure, he occasionally participated in services there, notably giving an address at the 1984 dedication of the Marks & Spencer financed Daily Bread window, on the topic of St Michael. However, Durham's hills were rather steep for him and he and Lady Ramsey accepted the offer of a flat at Bishopthorpe in York by then archbishop John Habgood. They stayed there just over a year, moving finally to St John's Home, attached to the All Saints' Sisters in Cowley, Oxford, where he died in April 1988.

During his retirement, he also spent several terms at Nashotah House, an Anglo-Catholic seminary of the Episcopal Church in Wisconsin where he was much beloved by students. A first-floor flat was designated "Lambeth West" for his personal use. A stained-glass window in the Chapel, bears his image and the same inscription as is on the memorial near his grave. The window (placed in the chapel by the class of 1976 who were among his first students at Nashotah) also includes a miniature image of the Bishop and his wife Joan. Ramsey Hall at Nashotah House was named in his honor, and is a residence for students and families. The Board of Directors of Nashotah House also presents, from time to time, the Michael Ramsey award for distinguished mission or ecumenical service in the Anglican Communion.

Ramsey's funeral was held in Canterbury Cathedral on 3 May. He was cremated and his ashes buried in the cloister garden at the cathedral, not far from the grave of William Temple. His wife's ashes were also buried there. On the memorial stone are inscribed words from St Irenaeus: "The Glory of God is the living man; And the life of man is the vision of God." A side chapel at Canterbury Cathedral was subsequently dedicated to Ramsey's memory, situated next to a similar memorial chapel to Archbishop Geoffrey Fisher. Ramsey had no children. Lady Ramsey died on 17 February 1995 and was buried alongside her husband.

== Honours ==
Ramsey received numerous honours, he was an honorary fellow of Magdalene College and Selwyn College, Cambridge, and of Merton College, Keble College, and St Cross College, Oxford. He was made an honorary master of the bench, Inner Temple in 1962; was a trustee of the British Museum from 1963 to 1969; and made an honorary Fellow of the British Academy in 1983. He held honorary degrees from Durham, Leeds, Edinburgh, Cambridge, Hull, Manchester, London, Oxford, Kent, and Keele and from a number of overseas universities.”

== Legacy ==
Dr Sam Brewitt-Taylor, a historian at Lincoln College, University of Oxford, holds that “there is much more historical and theoretical work to be done before Ramsey’s legacy can be properly ascertained.”

Ramsey's name has been given to Ramsey House, a residence of St Chad's College, University of Durham. He was a Fellow and Governor of the college (resident for a period) and he regularly worshipped and presided at the college's daily Eucharist. A building is also named after him at Canterbury Christ Church University. A house at Tenison's School is named in his honour. He also gave his name to the former Archbishop Michael Ramsey Technology College (from September 2007 St Michael and All Angels Church of England Academy) in Farmers' Road, Camberwell, South East London.

An annual Michael Ramsey Lecture on an appropriate theological topic is delivered at Little St Mary's, Cambridge in early November.

Michael Ramsey Prize for theological writing launched in 2005 and awarded every three years.

== Items found in River Wear ==
In October 2009 it was reported by Maev Kennedy that two divers had found a number of gold and silver items in the River Wear in Durham which were subsequently discovered to have come from Ramsey's personal collection, including items presented to him from dignitaries around the world while he was Archbishop of Canterbury. It is unclear how they came to be in the river. The divers were licensed by the dean and chapter of the cathedral as the owners of the land around the stretch of the river where the items were found. The current legal ownership of the items is yet to be determined. The cathedral was planning an exhibition relating to Ramsey's life in 2010 and a new stained-glass window dedicated to him by artist Tom Denny.

The two amateur divers, brothers Gary and Trevor Bankhead, found a total of 32 religious artefacts in the River Wear in Durham during a full underwater survey of the area around Prebends Bridge. The underwater survey commenced in April 2007 and took two and half years to complete. The finds were individually handed over to the resident archaeologist from Durham Cathedral to formally record where and when they were found.

== Works ==
Books

- The Gospel and the Catholic Church (1936)
- The Resurrection of Christ (1945)
- The Glory of God and the Transfiguration of Christ (1949)
- F. D. Maurice and the Conflicts of Modern Theology (1951)
- Durham Essays and Addresses (1956)
- From Gore to Temple (1960)
- Introducing the Christian Faith (1961)
- Image Old and New (1963)
- Canterbury Essays and Addresses (1964)
- Sacred and Secular (1965) (Scott Holland Memorial Lectures, 1964)
- God, Christ and the World (1969)
- The Future of the Christian Church with Cardinal Suenens (1971)
- The Christian Priest Today (1972)
- Canterbury Pilgrim (1974)
- Holy Spirit (1977)
- Jesus and the Living Past (1980)
- Be Still and Know (1982)
- The Anglican Spirit, ed. Dale D. Coleman (1991/2004)

Works online

- “Faith and Society: an Address to the Church Union School of Sociology, 1955"
- “Unity, Truth and Holiness” (no date).
- “Constantinople and Canterbury: A Lecture in the University of Athens" (1962)
- “Sermons Preached by the Most Reverend and Right Honorable Arthur Michael Ramsey, Lord Archbishop of Canterbury in New York City, 1962.”
- “Sermon Preached at Canterbury Cathedral” 1968.
- “Address by the Archbishop of Canterbury to the meeting of the Joint Anglican/Orthodox Steering Committee at Lambeth, 1974.”
- “Charles C. Grafton, Bishop and Theologian,” Lecture at Nashotah House Theological Seminary, 1967.

Academic offices
Preceded by Oliver Chase Quick	Van Mildert Professor of Divinity; 1940 – 1950	Succeeded by Stanley Lawrence Greenslade
Preceded by Charles E. Raven	Regius Professor of Divinity at Cambridge; 1950–1952	Succeeded by John Burnaby
Church of England titles
Preceded by Alwyn Williams	Bishop of Durham; 1952–1956	Succeeded by Maurice Harland
Preceded by Cyril Garbett	Archbishop of York; 1956–1961	Succeeded by Donald Coggan
Preceded by Geoffrey Fisher	Archbishop of Canterbury; 1961–1974	Succeeded by Donald Coggan
