= Anna Aikin =

Anna Aikin may refer to:

- Anna Bateson (c. 1830–1918), née Aikin; suffragist
- Anna Laetitia Barbauld (1743–1825), née Aikin; writer
