= Arthur Beer =

German astronomer

Arthur Beer (28 June 1900 – 20 October 1980) was a German astronomer who worked at Cambridge University

== Biography ==
He was born in Reichenberg, Bohemia, the only son of Professor Johan Beer, a secondary teacher of arts and crafts, and Olga née Pollak. Arthur completed his secondary education in 1918 in Reichenberg after returning from military service in World War I. His university studies were postponed after he contracted polio in 1924; he later received a necessary operation to enable him to walk.

He married Charlotte Vera Popielarski in 1925 and received his Ph.D. in 1927 with the dissertation "Zur Charakterisierung der spektroskopischen Doppelsterne" ("On the characterization of spectroscopic binaries"). Beer then worked as a secondary assistant on radiation of planets and on star observation reductions for the second catalogue of the Astronomische Gesellschaft, at the Breslau University Observatory through 1928. In 1929 he worked in Hamburg, Germany at the Deutsche Seewarte (German Maritime Observatory) as a tide astronomer and produced a program for the North German Radio Station called Aus Natur und Technik ("News from Nature and Technology"), among the first scientific radio program series ever aired. In the spring of 1930 he left the Maritime Observatory. He next participated in the installation of the 'Modern Times' section of a permanent exhibition in the new Hamburg Planetarium under art historian Fritz Saxl, Director of the Kulturwissenschaftliche Bibliothek Warburg (Warburg Cultural Library). Beer gave frequent lectures at the planetarium, was a columnist for various newspapers both within Germany and abroad, and continued producing his radio programs, eventually aired in Germany, Austria and Switzerland. He also supplemented his income with lectures in Germany and in Czechoslovakia. The Warburg Cultural Library eventually had to be relocated, under the disparagement of Nazism, to London, in 1933, where it became known as the Warburg Institute.

== Cambridge ==
Due to persecution of Jewish scientists in Nazi Germany, Arthur emigrated to Cambridge in 1934, with the help of associations with Albert Einstein, Erwin Finlay-Freundlich, and Fritz Saxl of the Warburg Institute. Einstein's letter of recommendation to Mrs. Clara Stern, dated June 11, 1933, included the following information...

He is an astronomer of 33 years, held in high esteem by all specialists, a Bohemian Jew who... has worked exclusively in Germany at the largest institutes with very good success. This man has now lost, with brutal consequence, all possibilities, even the smallest ones, to earn his living, so now he has become without subsistence, and is literally forced to be a beggar. I have a handful of brilliant testimonies of him and his work. He has a wife and a child [Peter Beer]. ...he can be reached via Dr. Freundlich, Potsdam Astrophysical Observatory.

Beer carried out astrophysical research under F.J.M. Stratton at the Cambridge Solar Physics Observatory from 1934 to 1937. He was a seismologist at the Kew (meteorological-seismological) Observatory from 1941 to 1945. From 1946 until his retirement in 1967 he was senior assistant observer at Cambridge Observatories. He also traveled to work at the Dominion Astrophysical Observatory, Canada, and to the U.S. as a visiting professor at Swarthmore College during this period. In the early 1950s Arthur committed himself to a voluminous and thorough survey of current astronomy. Ultimately, 215 scientists, mathematicians and historians contributed to what was to become the multi-volume Vistas of Astronomy, covering both historical and current topics, for which he was a writer and editor-in-chief (1955–1956) for the first two volumes. The series outlived Beer, Volume 42 appearing in 1998, before its functions were taken over by the New Astronomy Reviews and the Journal of Astronomical History and Heritage.

Beer was a member of the Royal Astronomical Society and the International Astronomical Union. He continued a lifetime of scientific and popular contributions to newspapers and journals as well as translating several scientific works. In addition, he was awarded an honorary doctorate for his work in the history of astronomy. He is buried in the Ascension Parish Burial Ground, Cambridge with his wife Charlotte.

Minor astronomy object 1896 Beer is named for him.
