= Ascension Parish Burial Ground =

Cemetery in Cambridge, England

Coordinates: 52.2176°N 0.1001°E

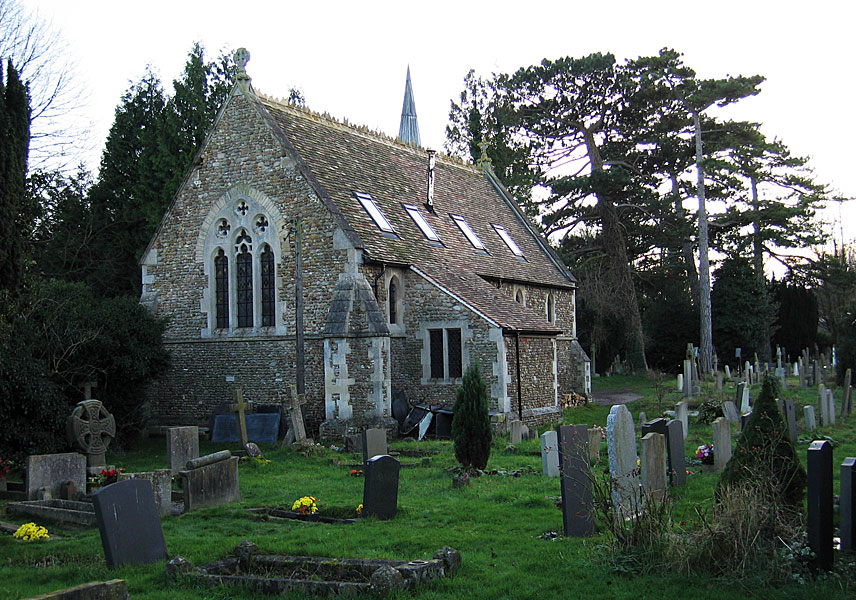
The former chapel of rest at the Ascension Parish Burial Ground

The Ascension Parish Burial Ground, formerly known as the burial ground for the parish of St Giles and St Peter's, is a cemetery off Huntingdon Road in Cambridge, England. Many notable University of Cambridge academics are buried there, including three Nobel Prize winners.

Although a Church of England site, the cemetery includes the graves of many non-conformists, reflecting the demographics of the parish in the 19th and 20th centuries, which covered much of West Cambridge.

It was established in 1857 while the city of Cambridge was undergoing rapid expansion, although the first burial was not until 1869. It covers one and a half acres and contains 1,500 graves with 2,500 burials. Originally surrounded by open fields, it is now bounded by trees and the gardens of detached houses, and is a designated city wildlife site.

In 2020, it was formally closed to new burials by an Order in Council, and responsibility for its upkeep was transferred to Cambridge City Council.

The former chapel of rest is now used as the workshop of letter-carver Eric Marland.

== Graves and memorials of notable individuals ==
=== A ===
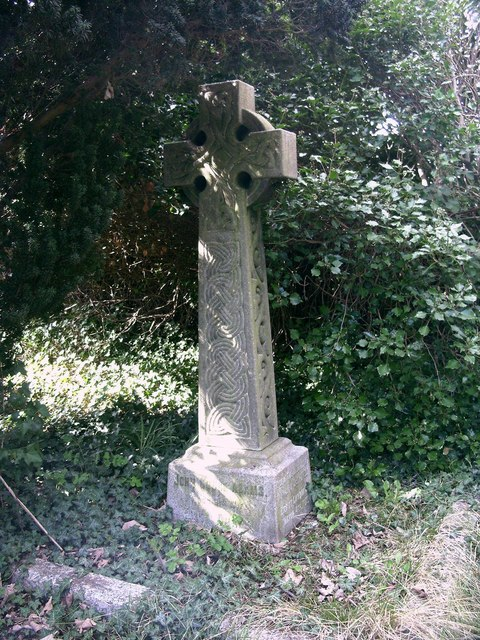
Grave of astronomer John Couch Adams and wife Eliza Adams

- John Couch Adams, astronomer, discoverer of Neptune, Lowndean Professor. He is unique in also having a commemorative memorial in Westminster Abbey
- Hugh Kerr Anderson, physiologist, Master Gonville and Caius College.
- Elizabeth Anscombe, Fellow of Newnham College, Philosopher, Professor of Philosophy. her husband Peter Geach is buried with her.
- Richard Appleton, Master Selwyn College, Vicar of St. George's, Camberwell, Vicar of Ware.
- Arthur John Arberry orientalist, Professor of Arabic, Fellow of Pembroke College, Cambridge.

=== B ===
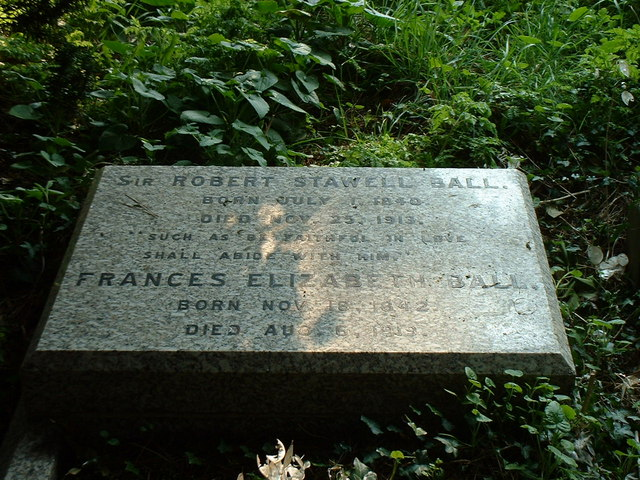
Grave of Sir Robert Stawell Ball and wife Lady Frances Elizabeth Ball.

- Sir Robert Stawell Ball, astronomer, Lowndean Professor of Astronomy and Geometry, founded the screw theory.
- Arthur Beer, astronomer, member of Caius College.
- Cecil Bendall Professor of Sanskrit, University of Cambridge; Honorary Fellow of Gonville and Caius College.
- Edwin Keppel Bennett, noms de plume: Francis Bennett, Francis Keppel, Fellow and President of Gonville and Caius College.
- Jack A. W. Bennett, New Zealand born literary scholar, a member of the informal Oxford literary group, the Inklings, Fellow of Magdalen College.
- Arthur Christopher Benson, 28th Master of Magdalene College, Cambridge noted for writing the words of the song "Land of Hope and Glory".
- William Henry Besant FRS, Fellow of St John's, mathematician
- James Bethune-Baker, theologian, Lady Margaret's Professor of Divinity and Dean of Pembroke College.
- Frederick Blackman FRS, plant physiologist, Fellow of St John's.
- Joan Boulind CBE, fellow and tutor at Hughes Hall, Cambridge.
- John Buckley Bradbury, Downing Professor of Medicine.
- Charles Oscar Brink, classicist, Fellow of Gonville and Caius College, Cambridge (cremated remains).
- Denis William Brogan, historian, Political Scientist.
- Zachary Nugent Brooke, historian, Professor of Medieval History.
- William Warwick Buckland, Professor of Law, President of Gonville and Caius College, Regius Professor of Civil Law.
- Robert Burn, Fellow of Trinity College, Cambridge, and wife Augusta Sophia, née Prescott (a descendant of Oliver Cromwell)
- John Burnaby, Dean of Trinity College, Cambridge, Regius Professor of Divinity, and wife Dorothy Burnaby, née Lock; also her brother Robert Heath Lock is buried in the same grave
- Geoffrey Bushnell, archaeologist and ethnologist, Fellow of Corpus Christi College, Cambridge.

=== C ===
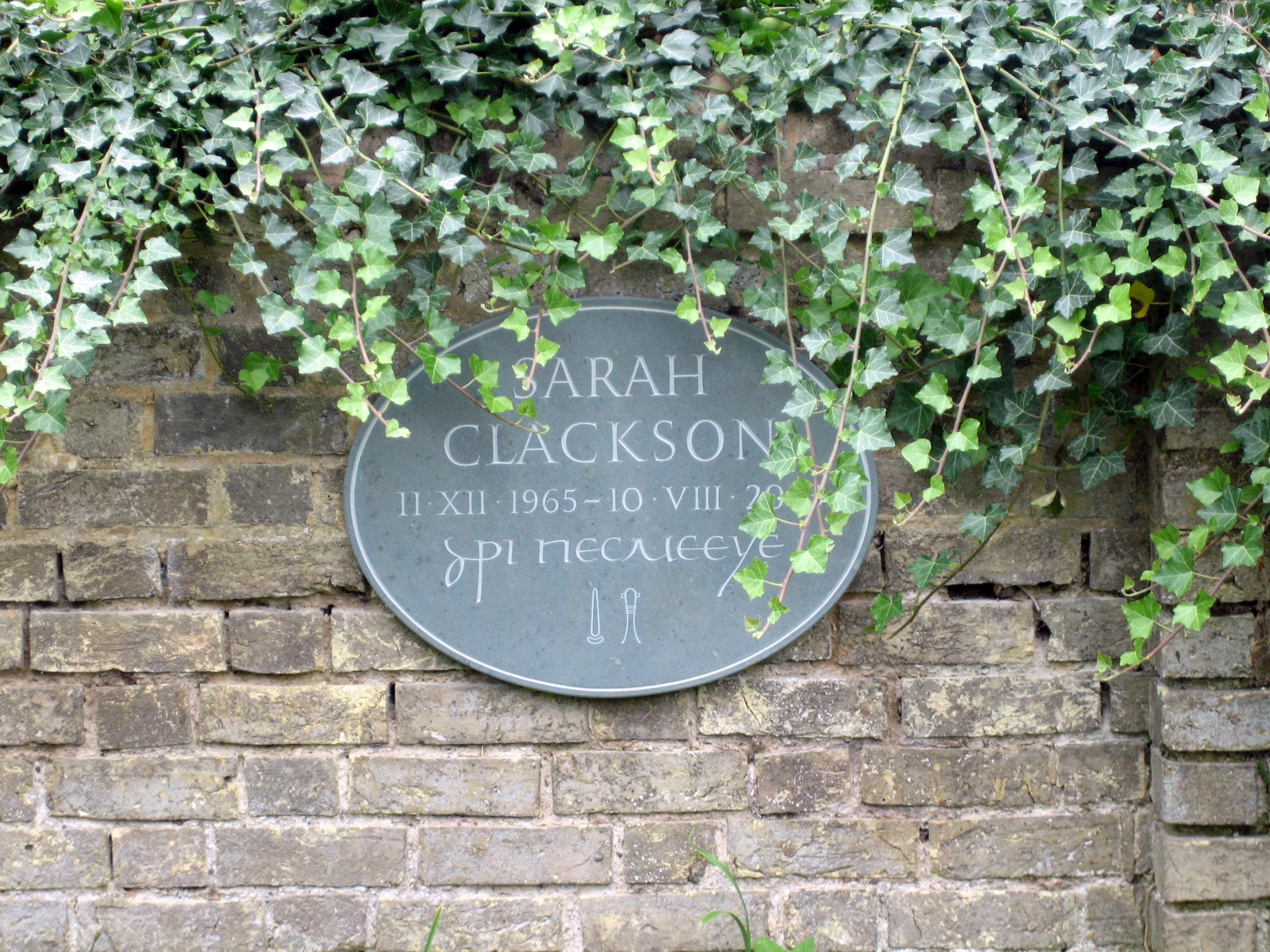
Memorial to Sarah Clackson

- James Cable, diplomat, naval strategist, and his wife Lady Cable, Viveca Hollmerus
- John Walton Capstick Bursar and Fellow of Trinity College, Cambridge physicist, musician
- Neville Chittick, scholar, archaeologist
- Richard Chorley, quantitative geographer, Vice-Master, Sidney Sussex College
- Sir Derman Christopherson FRS, engineering scientist, Master Magdalene College (1978–1985) and his wife Frances, Lady Christopherson
- Sarah Clackson Coptologist; first wife of James Clackson, Secretary of Friends of Ascension Parish Burial Ground.
- Sir William Henry Clark, civil servant.
- John Cockcroft, physicist, Nobel Prize winner, instrumental in the development of nuclear power, first Master of Churchill College.
- Agnes Bell Collier, Vice Principal of Newnham College, passed Maths Tripos in 1883.
- Frances Cornford, poet, interred in grave of her father Sir Francis Darwin; and his wife.

=== D ===
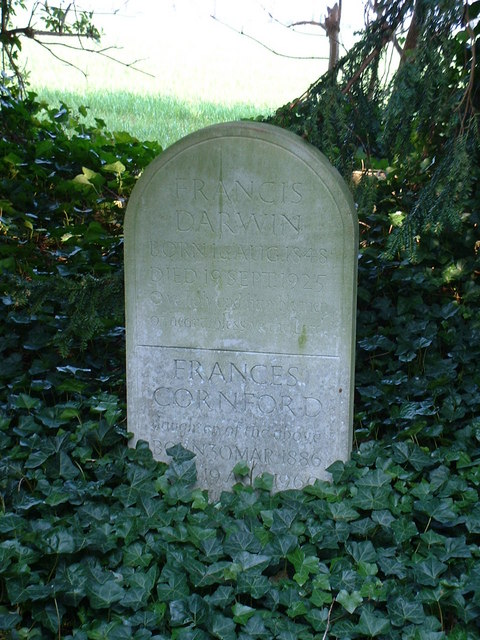
Gravestone of Sir Francis Darwin, FRS and his daughter Frances Cornford

- Francis Darwin, Botanist, biographer, buried with his daughter the poet Frances Cornford.
- Florence, Lady Darwin, third wife of Sir Francis Darwin.
- Sir Horace Darwin, Fellow of Trinity College, Cambridge, Scientific instrument maker and wife Lady Ida Darwin.

=== E ===
- Arthur Eddington, Astrophysicist, Plumian Professor of Astronomy and Experimental Philosophy (cremated remains interred in the grave of his mother Sarah Eddington.).
- Sir James Ewing FRS, Professor of Mechanism and Applied Mechanics, Professorial Fellowship at King's.

=== F ===
- Michael James Farrell, Economist, recovered from polio after being in an iron lung.
- Thomas Cecil Fitzpatrick, Vice-Chancellor and Master of Queens' College, Cambridge.
- Sir James Frazer, Anthropologist, Fellow of Trinity College, Cambridge.

=== G ===
- Peter Geach, Philosopher, buried with his late wife Elizabeth Anscombe.
- Roberto Gerhard Composer, Musical Scholar.
- Jean Grove, Glaciologist, Fellow of Girton College, Cambridge. Older sister of the historian Margaret Spufford. Buried beside her mother Mary Clark, her niece Bridget Spufford, and her son Richard Grove.
- Richard Grove, Environmental historian. Buried beside his mother Jean Grove, and together with his grandmother Mary Clark and cousin Bridget Spufford
- Henry Melvill Gwatkin, Dixie Professor of Ecclesiastical History, Historian, theologian, conchologist.

=== H ===
- Reginald Hackforth Laurence Professor of Ancient Philosophy, Classical Scholar, Fellow of Sidney Sussex College.
- Basil Hammond, Historian.
- William Emerton Heitland Classicist, Fellow of Emmanuel.
- Margaret Heitland journalist and suffragette.
- Robert Drew Hicks Fellow of Trinity College, Cambridge, classicist, blind for 30 years.
- Paul Hirsch assembled one of the largest private music libraries in Europe, now in the British Library
- Ernest William Hobson Mathematician, Sadleirian Professor, Fellow of Christ's College, Cambridge.
- Frederick Gowland Hopkins, Biochemist, Nobel Prize winner for discovery of vitamins.
- Bertram Hopkinson, Patent Lawyer, Engineer, Professor of Mechanism and Applied Mechanics.
- Tristram Frederick Croft Huddleston, Classicist and Censor of Fitzwilliam House 1890–1907.
- Arthur Hutchinson, Mineralogist and Master Pembroke College.

=== J ===
- Henry Jackson, Regius Professor of Greek (Cambridge), Classicist, Member of the Cambridge Apostles.
- Sir Richard Jebb, Regius Professor of Greek (Cambridge), Classicist, Member of the Cambridge Apostles.
- Caroline Jebb, American intellectual and socialite, wife of Richard Jebb.

=== K ===
- Courtney Stanhope Kenny, Legal scholar, Liberal politician, Downing Professor of the Laws of England.

=== L ===
- Horace Lamb, Mathematician and physicist.
- Guy Lee, Cambridge professor, classicist, translator of Ovid, Horace and Catullus, Fellow of St John's College, Cambridge.
- Edward Hubert Linfoot Mathematician, Fellow of Wolfson College
- George Downing Liveing FRS, Professor of Chemistry, Fellow and President of St John's College, Cambridge and his wife Catharine
- John Bascombe Lock, Bursar of Gonville and Caius College, author of books on trigonometry, Chair of Addenbrooke's Hospital.
- Robert Heath Lock, botanist and geneticist, wrote the first English textbook on genetics.
- Henry Richards Luard Fellow of Trinity College, Cambridge, mathematician and clergyman

=== M ===
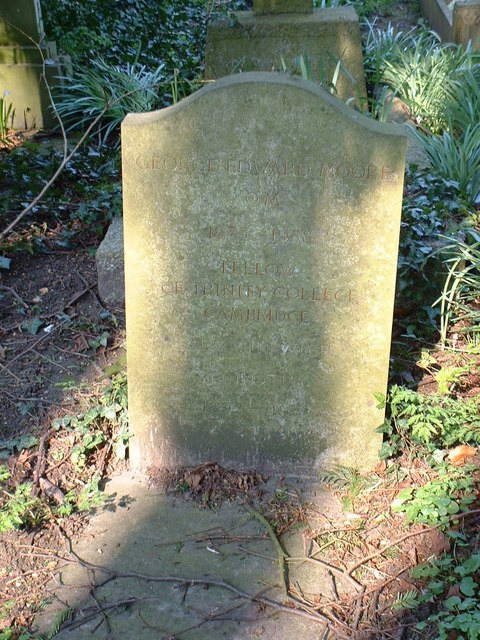
Gravestone of philosopher G. E. Moore OM and wife Dorothy Moore

- Alexander Macalister, Professor of Anatomy, Cambridge University, Egyptologist, Fellow of St John's College, Cambridge.
- R. A. Stewart Macalister, archaeologist, son of Alexander Macalister.
- Sir Donald MacAlister, Physician, Vice-Chancellor Glasgow, Member of the Cambridge Apostles.
- Sir Desmond MacCarthy, Literary and drama critic, Member of the Cambridge Apostles.
- Norman McLean, Orientalist and Member of the Cambridge Apostles, Master Christ's College, Cambridge.
- Alfred Marshall, Professor of Political Economy one of the founders of Neoclassical economics, married to Mary Paley, co-founder of Newnham College.
- Sir Charles James Martin FRS, Scientist, Fellow of King's College, London.
- Brigadier Arthur Gordon Matthew
- Jeremy Maule, English scholar and teacher; Fellow and Lecturer in English, Trinity College.
- Edwin Arthur Maxwell, Mathematician; Director of Studies in Mathematics, University of Cambridge, Honorary Fellow of Queens' College, Cambridge.
- John Eyton Bickersteth Mayor, Professor of Latin, Antiquarian, early vegetarian and President of St John's College, Cambridge.
- Robert Williams Michell Surgeon.
- Sir Geoffrey Fitzhervey de Montmorency Indian Civil Service
- William Loudon Mollison, Master of Clare College, Cambridge
- G. E. Moore, philosopher, Fellow of Trinity College, Cambridge, Member of the Cambridge Apostles, the intellectual secret society.
- Andrew Munro, bursar and mathematician of Queens' College, Cambridge.

=== N ===
- Hugh Frank Newall, Professor of Astrophysics, Fellow of Trinity College, Cambridge.
- George Ernest Newsom Master Selwyn College: 1934 to 1946
- Alfred Newton, Professor of Comparative Anatomy, Fellow of Magdalene College, Ornithologist.

=== P ===
- Conrad Pepler Priest, Writer, Editor, Publisher
- Max Perutz, OM, FRS, Molecular Biologist, Nobel Prize winner, Fellow of Peterhouse, and wife Gisela Perutz; their cremated remains are buried together with his parents Hugo and Dely Perutz.

=== R ===
- Sir Leon Radzinowicz FBA, Criminologist, Fellow of Trinity College, Cambridge.
- Arthur Stanley Ramsey Mathematician and philosopher, President of Magdalene College.
- Frank P. Ramsey Philosopher and mathematician, Member of the Cambridge Apostles, the intellectual secret society, buried in same grave as his parents: Arthur Stanley Ramsey and Mary Agnes Ramsey.
- William Luard Raynes OBE, solicitor, twice Mayor of Cambridge.
- William Halse Rivers Rivers FRS, Fellow of St John's College, Cambridge, Anthropologist, Neurologist, Ethnologist, Psychologist
- David Roberts, architect and fellow of Magdalene College.
- Walter William Rouse Ball, Mathematician, author on the History of Mathematics, endowed professorships.

=== S ===
- John Edwin Sandys, Classicist and Public Orator of Cambridge University.
- Sir Charles Henry Sargant, Lord Justice of Appeal, Privy Counsellor
- Charlotte Scott, mathematician, first unofficial wrangler, buried in the grave of cousin Eliza Nevin.
- Isabel May Griffiths Seltman, wife of Charles Seltman, art historian, fellow of Queens' College, Cambridge and a University Lecturer in Classics.
- Gerald Shove, economist and Member of the Cambridge Apostles, the intellectual secret society, and Fredegond Shove, poet, step-daughter of Sir Francis Darwin; her mother was Lady Darwin, formerly Florence Maitland;
- Walter William Skeat, Philologist, Elrington and Bosworth Professor of Anglo-Saxon.
- Lucy Joan Slater, Mathematician and Recorder of Ascension Parish Burial Ground, buried in her mother's grave (Lucy Slater, Classicist)
- George Smee, solicitor, and wife Eliza Smee; monument designed by Jacob Epstein.
- Bridget Spufford, after whom "Bridget's Hostel", Cambridge was named; daughter of Professors Peter Spufford and the late Margaret Spufford, sister of Francis Spufford. She is buried with her grandmother, Mary Clark, née Johnson.
- Vincent Henry Stanton, Regius Professor of Divinity, Member of the Cambridge Apostles, the intellectual society at Cambridge University.
- Joseph Peter Stern, Germanist, Fellow of St John's College, Cambridge, (cremated remains).
- Stanley Stubbs Headmaster of Perse School.

=== T ===
- Joseph Robson Tanner, Bursar of St John's, Samuel Pepys expert.
- Charles Taylor Vice-Chancellor and Master St. John's College: 1881 to 1908, Fellow of St John's College, Cambridge, mathematician and Hebrew scholar
- Harold McCarter Taylor Mathematician, Barrister, a Fellow of Clare College, (cremated remains)
- Henry Martyn Taylor, Mathematician, braille expert.
- Sir Alfred St Valery Tebbitt, managing director of Kirby, Beard & Co. and British Chamber of Commerce, Paris, and of the Hertford British Hospital, Paris, and wife Lady Gladys St. Valery Tebbitt, née Pendrell Smith.

=== V ===
- Augustus Arthur Vansittart, Fellow of Trinity College, Cambridge, classical scholar.
- Arthur Woollgar Verrall, Classicist, Member of the Cambridge Apostles, King Edward VII Professor of English Literature.
- Margaret Verrall, parapsychology researcher and lecturer in classics at Newnham College.

=== W ===
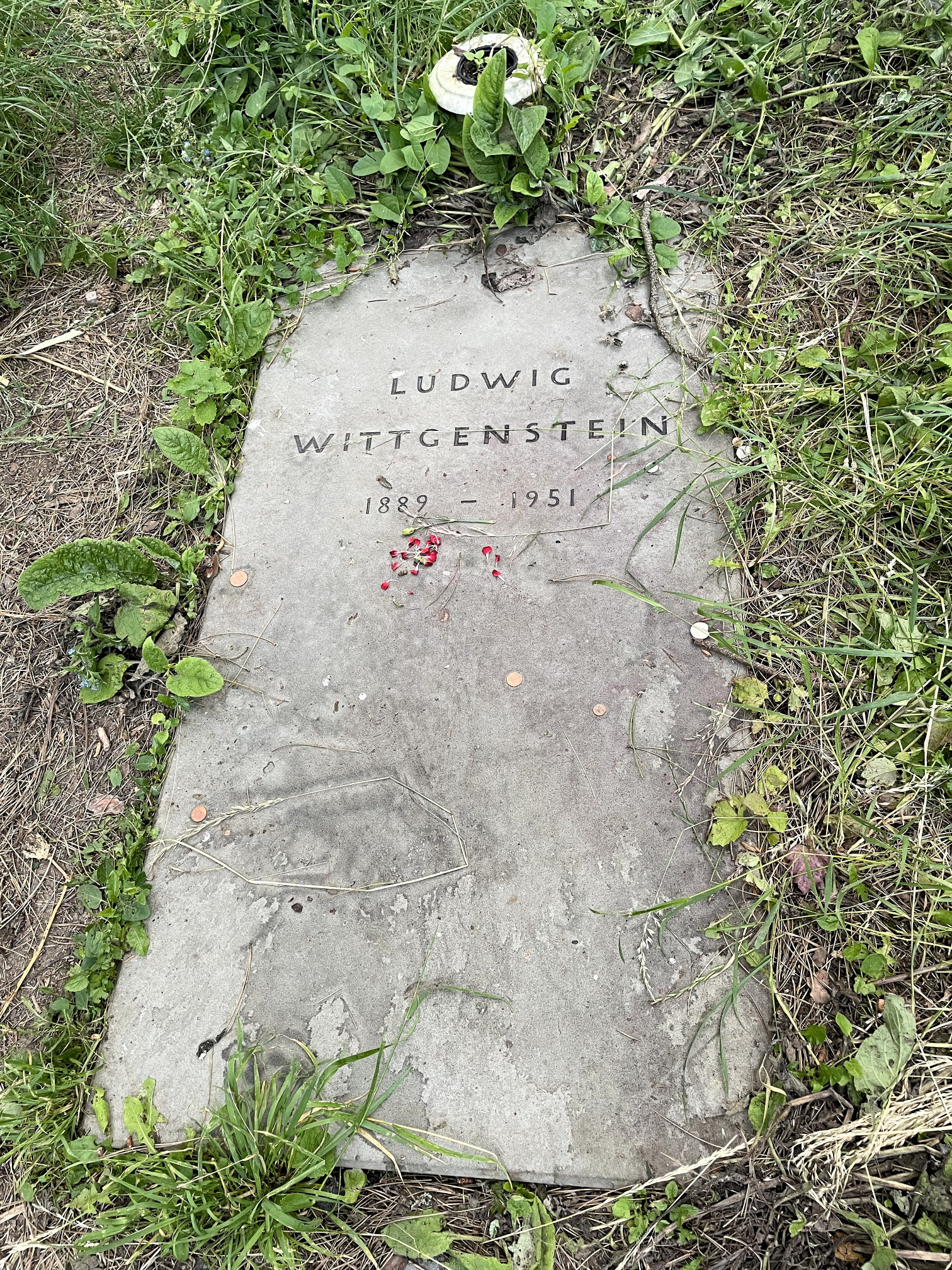
Wittgenstein's gravestone in 2021

- Harry Marshall Ward, colleague of Sir Francis Darwin.
- Sir Percy Henry Winfield FBA, Rouse Ball Professor of English Law, Fellow of St John's College, Cambridge, author of The Law of Torts and his wife Lady Helena Winfield, née Scruby
- Denys Winstanley, Vice Master Trinity College, Cambridge.
- John Wisdom (cremated), Professor of Philosophy, Fellow of Trinity College, Cambridge, philosopher, and Honorary Fellow of Fitzwilliam College.
- Ludwig Wittgenstein, philosopher, Professor of Philosophy, Fellow of Trinity College, Cambridge, Member of the Cambridge Apostles.
- Charles Wood, Professor of Music, Fellow of Gonville and Caius College, composer.
- William Aldis Wright, Shakespearean and Biblical scholar, Vice-Master Trinity College, Cambridge.

== Darwin family ==
Five members of the family of Charles Darwin are interred here: two sons: Sir Francis Darwin and Sir Horace Darwin, two daughters-in-law: Lady Florence Darwin (third wife of Francis) and Lady Ida Darwin (wife of Horace), and a granddaughter: Frances Cornford, the daughter of Francis Darwin by his second wife, Ellen Wordsworth Darwin, née Crofts.

Charles Darwin himself is buried in Westminster Abbey.
