= William Emerton Heitland =

British classical scholar (1847–1935)

William Emerton Heitland (21 December 1847 – 23 June 1935) was an English classicist at Cambridge University who was described as having a passionate desire to attain the truth.

== Life ==
Heitland's father, Arthur Allan Heitland (Note: Heitland was a godson of the Duke of Wellington.), youngest child of Major William Peter Heitland of the Madras Pioneers, was a farmer and his mother, Mary Browne of Colkirk House (Note: Colkirk House was built for William Rowland Sandiford (Mary Heitland née Browne's stepfather), Sandiford wiped out the Browne's fortune.), Lady of Nowers Manor in Hindringham, was the daughter of Riches Repps Browne (1791-1823) more commonly known as Repps Browne, (Note: Browne was tenant of Ellem Lodge in Longformacus, Berwickshire, Scotland and son and heir of Daniel Browne, a woolen draper based in King's Lynn.) a Norfolk gentleman by his wife Mary Jex (Note: A Mary Jex of the same family married Joseph Godwin, one of the brothers of philosopher and novelist, William Godwin at Fulmodeston on 11 December 1776.) (1800-1839) of Fulmodeston in Norfolk. Heitland was admitted a pensioner of St. John's College, Cambridge, in 1867, a Craven scholar, 1869, B.A (Senior Classic (Note: Senior Classic at Cambridge is of the same rank in regard to classical achievement as that of Senior Wrangler is to achievement in mathematics.)), 1871, M.A, 1874, Fellow, 1871-1935 and Tutor, 1883-93. He married Margaret Bateson at Marylebone in 1901, she was the daughter of William Henry Bateson, master of St John's College in 1901; she lived between 1860 and 1938.

He is buried in the Ascension Parish Burial Ground, Cambridge. with his wife Margaret Heitland, a journalist and stalwart of the suffragette movement.

At the time of his death, his estate was valued at £26519 4s. 4d. One third of the residue of Heitland estate help establishing a fund named after him.

== Published works ==
- A Letter to a Lady; or, A Word with the Female Anti-Suffragists. Cambridge: Elijah Johnson, 1908.
- The Roman Republic, 3 vols. Cambridge: Cambridge University Press, 1909.
- A Short History of the Roman Republic. Cambridge: Cambridge University Press, 1911.
- “Democratic”: a Discursive Study. Cambridge: Bowes & Bowes, 1915.
- If We Win: a Search for a Path to Stable Peace. Cambridge: Elijah Johnson, 1915.
- Agricola: a Study of Agriculture and Rustic Life in the Greco-Roman World from the Point of View of Labour. Cambridge: Cambridge University Press, 1921.
- The Roman Fate: an Essay in Interpretation. Cambridge: Cambridge University Press, 1922.
- Iterum; or, A Further Discussion of the Roman Fate. Cambridge: Cambridge University Press, 1925.
- After Many Years: a Tale of Experiences and Impressions Gathered in the Course of an Obscure Life. Cambridge: Cambridge University Press, 1926.
- Last Words on the Roman Municipalities. Cambridge: Cambridge University Press, 1928.
- Repetita: an Unwilling Restatement of Views on the Subject of the Roman Municipalities. Cambridge: Cambridge University Press, 1930.

== Relatives ==
British engraver John Browne (1742-1801).

American born illustrator and watercolor artist Wilmot Emerton Heitland, N.A. (1893-1969) was his nephew, some of his paintings are on display at the Art Institute of Chicago, the Brooklyn Museum and the Philadelphia Museum School of Art.

== Legacy ==
The Heitland Fund, capital and income at the disposal of the Fitzwilliam Museum.
