= W. H. Besant =

British mathematician

William Henry Besant
- Born: 1 November 1828
- Died: 2 June 1917 (aged 88)
- Known for: Senior Wrangler; Tripos coach Besant-Rayleigh–Plesset equation
- Scientific career
- Fields: Mathematics; Fluid dynamics

William Henry Besant FRS (1 November 1828 – 2 June 1917) was a British mathematician, brother of novelist Walter Besant. Another brother, Frank, was the husband of Annie Besant.

== Parentage ==
William was born in Portsea, Portsmouth on 1 November 1828. According to William's brother Walter, their father "tried many things. For some time he was in very low water; then he got up again and settled in a quiet office. He was not a pushing man, nor did he know how to catch at opportunities. Mostly he waited. Meanwhile, he was a studious man, whose chief delight was in reading... He was never in the least degree moved by the Calvinistic fanaticism of the time... Although regular in attendance at Church, he never ventured to present himself at Holy Communion."

Walter also wrote that their mother "was a New Forest girl, born and brought up in a village called Dibden near Hythe and Beaulieu (Bewlay). The church stands actually in a forest... My mother was the youngest of a large family. During her childhood she ran about on the outskirts of the Forest, catching and riding bareback ponies, and drinking in the folklore and old-wife wisdom of that sequestered district...Her father was by trade a builder, contractor, and architect...My mother was the cleverest woman I have ever known: the quickest witted; the surest and safest in her judgements; the most prophetic for those she loved; the most far-seeing…The comfort of the house, the well-being of the children, were alike due to my mother’s genius for administration. Imagine, if you can, her pride and joy when her eldest child, her eldest son, took prizes and scholarships at Cambridge."

The boys attended Saint Paul's Grammar School. "My brother, the best man that ever came out of the school, was the captain in 1846, going to Cambridge in October of the year."

== Cambridge ==
In a competition, William won a scholarship to Corpus Christi College, Cambridge in 1844. He took part in Cambridge Mathematical Tripos in 1850, gaining the title of Senior Wrangler. He was also winner of Smith's Prize. But then, as Walter explained, he needed a rest:

Two or three years after [William Henry became Senior Wrangler], he had a long and serious illness. At the same time my youngest sister – a child of six or so – was threatened with Saint Vitus' Dance. A change of air was wanted for both, lodgings were taken at Freshwater Bay, in the Isle of Wight. I went with the two patients, and it was a delightful holiday. The sick people were convalescent. My brother talked to me all day long about Cambridge, and what he thought I ought to do. My imagination was fired. It seemed to me – it seems to me still – the most splendid thing in the world for a young fellow to go to the University; there to contend with young giants; and, if he can, to keep his field and be victorious.

In 1853 William became a Fellow of Saint John's College, Cambridge where he was a lecturer in mathematics until 1889. His pupils included William Burnside, A. W. Flux and G. B. Mathews. Besant served as an examiner for Tripos in 1856, 1857, and 1885. He was also an examiner for University of London from 1859 to 1864. Besant was also a coach for students taking the Tripos; twenty-one of his students placed in the ranks of top ten wranglers. According to Mathews, "he had the great advantage (for a coach) of being equally good in geometry, analysis, and dynamics."

In 1859 Besant vacated his Fellowship with Saint John's college to marry Margaret Elizabeth Willis, daughter of Rev. Robert Willis, a professor of natural philosophy at Cambridge. They had two sons and a daughter. In 1863 Besant published Elementary Hydrostatics, a textbook on fluid statics containing mathematical exercises such as students might face in examination. The book was reprinted several times, and revised in 1892. He also wrote Treatise on Hydromechanics (1867) covering fluid mechanics. His book Elementary Conics came out in 1901.

Besant was a Fellow of the Royal Astronomical Society from 10 February 1854. He became a Fellow of the Royal Society in 1871. In 1883 Cambridge University bestowed upon him, and Edward Routh, the degree Sc.D. He died on 2 June 1917 and is buried at the Parish of the Ascension Burial Ground in Cambridge.

== Publications ==
=== Papers ===
The following articles by W.H. Besant appeared in The Quarterly Journal of Pure and Applied Mathematics:

- 1861: volume 4, page 12: "The equilibrium of a bent lamina", and page 18: "The equilibrium of a flexible but inextensible and inelastic surface".
- 1864: volume 6, page 140: "On Meunier's theorem and on curvature of curves in space", and page 326: "Mathematical Notes", concerning chords of curvature on a conic and initial tension on a string.
- 1870: volume 10, page 110: "Note on the envelope of the pedal line of a triangle".
- 1871: volume 11, page 38: "Mathematical Notes", concerning dynamics, aberration, glissettes, and pedal lines.

Besant also published in Messenger of Mathematics:

- 1881: volume 11, pages 63,4: "Note on elasticity"

=== Books ===
- 1859: A Treatise on Hydrostatics and Hydrodynamics from Google Books
- 1889: Elementary Hydrostatics, 13th edition, from Internet Archive.
- 1890: Notes on Roulettes and Glissettes
- 1895: Conic sections treated Geometrically from Cornell University Historical Math Monographs.
- 1913: (with A. S. Ramsey) A Treatise on Hydromechanics from Google Books.
