= Arthur Gordon Matthew =

British Army officer

- Born: 22 December 1898; Cambridge, England
- Died: 6 October 1947 (aged 48); Delfzijl, Netherlands
- Military career
- Allegiance: United Kingdom
- Branch: British Army
- Service years: 1917–1947
- Rank: Brigadier
- Nickname: "Hammer"
- Service number: 13038
- Unit: Royal Horse Artillery
- Commands: Kiel Brigade Area (1946); Royal Artillery, VIII Corps (1943–46); Royal Artillery, 8th Armoured Division (1942–43); 104th (Essex Yeomanry) Regiment, Royal Horse Artillery (1941–42); 51st (Westmorland and Cumberland) Field Regiment, Royal Artillery (1941); 1st Regiment Royal Horse Artillery (1940–41)
- Conflicts: First World War; Second World War
- Awards: Commander of the Order of the British Empire; Distinguished Service Order; Mentioned in Despatches (5)

Brigadier Arthur Gordon Matthew CBE, DSO (22 December 1898 – 6 October 1947) was a British Royal Artillery officer who served in the First World War and the Second World War.

== Military career ==
Matthew (who was known as "Hammer") served in the First World War and in North Africa during the Second World War, including during the Siege of Tobruk and the Second Battle of El Alamein. After the Normandy campaign and the Rhine crossing, he served as commander of the Kiel Brigade area during the post-war occupation of Germany.

Matthew died in 1947 from a heart attack, but is recorded amongst the dead for the 1939–1945 conflict as occupation operations had then not yet normalised to peacetime arrangements. He is buried in the Parish of the Ascension Burial Ground in Cambridge.

He was awarded the Distinguished Service Order in 1941 for distinguished service in the Middle East between December 1940 and February 1941, and was appointed a Commander of the Most Excellent Order of the British Empire in 1945. He was also Mentioned in Despatches five times.
