= Basil Hammond =

English historian

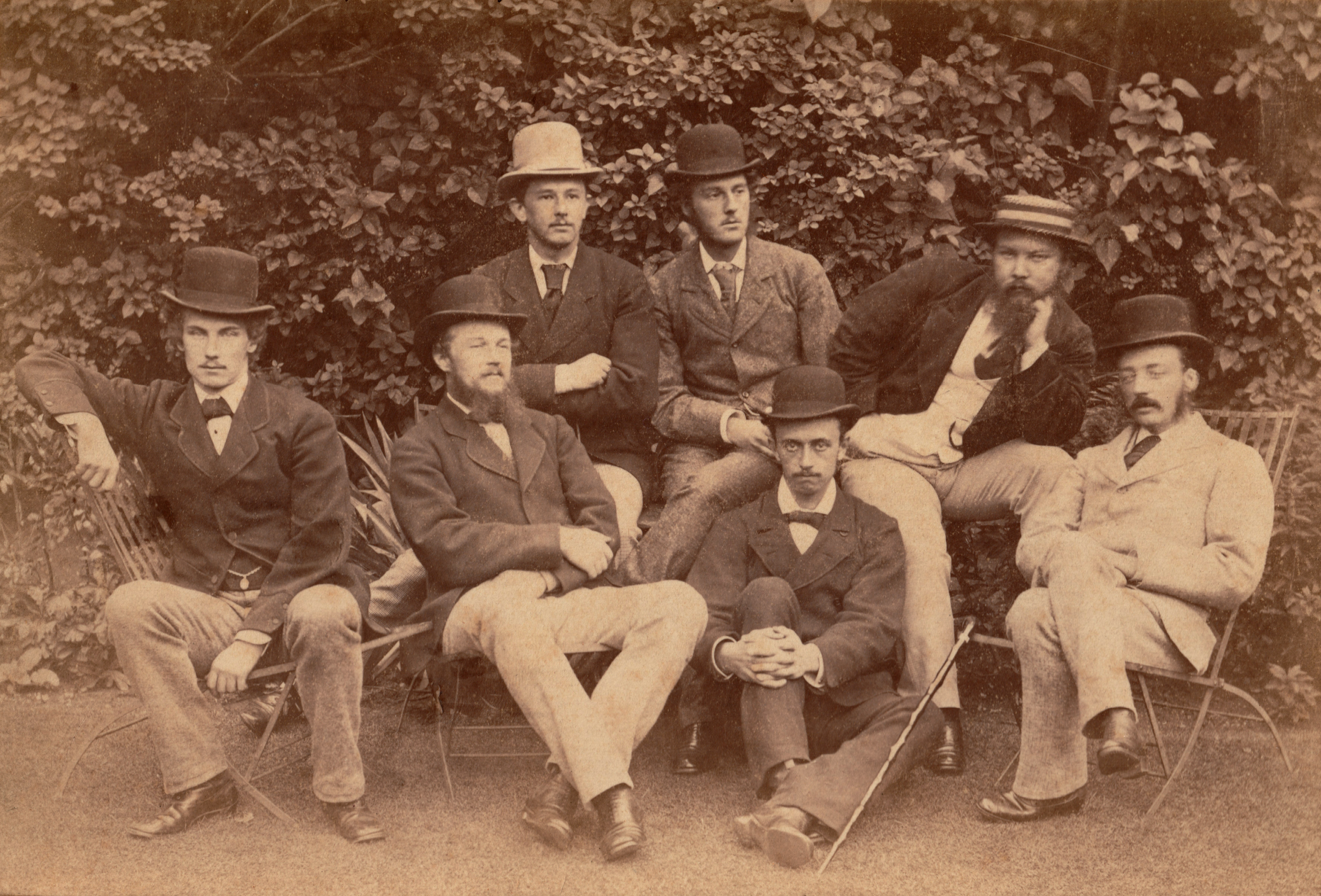
- Hammond in 1873 (second from left), Shakespeare Society, Trinity College, Cambridge
- Born: 10 August 1842
- Died: 6 December 1916 (aged 74)
- Burial place: Ascension Parish Burial Ground, Cambridge, England
- Occupation: historian
- Known for: Fellow of Trinity College, Cambridge
- Spouse: Margaret Slater

Basil Edward Hammond (10 August 1842 – 6 December 1916) was an English historian, Fellow of Trinity College, Cambridge.

He is buried in the Ascension Parish Burial Ground with his wife Margaret, daughter of Rev. Francis & Anne Slater.

== Publications ==
- The Political Institutions of the Ancient Greeks, 1895
- Outlines of Comparative Politics, 1903
- Bodies Politic and their Governments, 1915
