= James Cable =

British diplomat and naval strategic thinker

His Excellency Major Sir James Cable KCVO CMG

United Kingdom Ambassador to Finland
- In office 1975–1980
- Prime Minister: James Callaghan; Margaret Thatcher
- Preceded by: Thomas Elliott
- Succeeded by: Andrew Stuart

Personal details
- Born: 15 November 1920
- Died: 27 September 2001 (aged 80)
- Spouse: Viveca, Lady Cable (m. 1954)
- Education: Corpus Christi College, Cambridge
- Occupation: Thinker, author, diplomat, army officer
- Awards: Knight Commander of the Royal Victorian Order; Companion of the Order of St Michael and St George

Military service
- Allegiance: United Kingdom
- Branch/service: British Army
- Years of service: 1942–1953
- Rank: Major
- Battles/wars: Second World War

Sir James Eric Sydney Skelton Cable KCVO CMG (15 November 1920 – 27 September 2001) was a British diplomat and naval strategic thinker. As an author, he became well known for a series of his works published between 1971 and 1994 about gunboat diplomacy. The Telegraph described him as "one of the most influential naval strategic thinkers of the last half-century". During the Second World War he served as an officer in the British Army.

== Career ==
Born in November 1920, Cable was the son of a member of the Consular Service. He was educated at Stowe School in Stowe, Buckinghamshire. After Stowe, Cable went to Corpus Christi College, Cambridge to read modern languages.

After graduating he was called up to the British Army in 1941 to serve in the Second World War. Following officer training he was commissioned as a second lieutenant in the Royal Corps of Signals on 18 October 1942, and rose to the rank of major before joining the Diplomatic Service in 1947, his appointment was confirmed with effect from 18 November 1948, although he did not relinquish his army commission until 28 October 1953, when he was granted the honorary rank of major.

His position took him to Indonesia during the Independence War. Then, Cable went to Helsinki where he met his wife Viveca Hollmerus (1920–2004). After that, he left Helsinki for Budapest, he was expelled in 1959, as a reprisal for the expulsion of a Hungarian diplomat from London. Cable was then appointed Consul in Quito, Ecuador, on 28 July 1959. He subsequently served in the Middle-East and as head of the Foreign Office South-East Asia Department for two years. In the 1967 New Year Honours he was appointed Companion of the Order of St Michael and St George for his work as Counsellor at the British Embassy in Beirut, Lebanon. In late 1960s, he published his maiden work, British foreign policy and international relations. Then Cable took a year's sabbatical, during which he finished his second work, Gunboat Diplomacy. He also received a doctorate that year. Cable became the head of the FCO's Planning Staff from 1971 to 1975, and was then briefly Assistant Under-Secretary of State, before returning to Helsinki as Ambassador from 1 October 1975 until his retirement in 1980. He was appointed Knight Commander of the Royal Victorian Order on 28 May 1976.

He continued to write after quitting the FCO, and published several works, including The Political Influence of Naval Force in History (1998), The Royal Navy and the Siege of Bilbao (1979), Britain's Naval Future (1983), Diplomacy at Sea (1985) and Navies in Violent Peace (1989). Cable died on 27 September 2001, aged 80. He is buried at the Parish of the Ascension Burial Ground in Cambridge. Cable and his wife, Viveca had a son, Charles.

== Gunboat diplomacy ==
Cable defined gunboat diplomacy as "the use or threat of limited naval force, otherwise than as an act of war, in order to secure advantage or to avert loss, either in the furtherance of an international dispute or else against foreign nationals within the territory or the jurisdiction of their own state". He divided the examples of gunboat diplomacy into four categories: definitive, purposeful, catalytic and expressive. All of them are tools of diplomacy. Cable start a revival of naval strategic thought, and had a great influence on Post-Cold War naval thinking, especially in United Kingdom and United States.

Diplomatic posts
| Preceded by Thomas Elliott | United Kingdom Ambassador to Finland; 1975–1980 | Succeeded by Andrew Stuart |
