= Viveca Hollmerus =

Finnish-Swedish author

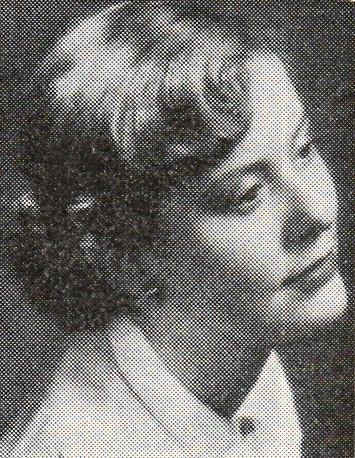
Viveca Hollmerus

Viveca Tulla Hollmerus, Lady Cable (29 March 1920 – 5 November 2004) was a Finland-Swedish author.

Born in Helsinki, Finland, Hollmerus was married with the Finnish industrialist Eric Bargum from 1938 till 1954; they had three children, among them the author Johan Bargum. In 1954 she married the British diplomat Sir James Cable; they had one son.

In 1951 she was awarded the Svenska Dagbladet Literature Prize, shared with Willy Kyrklund, Staffan Larsson and Per Anders Fogelström.

She died in 2004 in Cambridge, England, and is buried in the Ascension Parish Burial Ground, with her husband who died in 2001.

== Bibliography ==
- Nervlänges 1950
- Glasflötet 1951
- Dagblind 1952
- Ingenmanstid 1954
- Då skrek Katharine 1969
