= Arthur Stanley Ramsey =

British mathematician

Arthur Stanley Ramsey (9 September 1867 – 31 December 1954) was a British mathematician and author of mathematics and physics textbooks. He was Fellow of Magdalene College, Cambridge, and its President from 1915–52.

== Biography ==
The son of Rev. Adam Averell Ramsey of Dewsbury, a Congregational minister, and his wife Hephzibah, Ramsey was educated at Batley Grammar School and Magdalene College, Cambridge where he read Mathematics (B.A. (6th Wrangler) 1889; M.A. 1893).

He was Assistant Master at Fettes College from 1890 to 1897, moving into academia as Fellow of Magdalene in 1897. He was Bursar of the college, 1904–13 and University Lecturer in Mathematics, 1926-32. As a tutor, he supervised the maths work of William Empson, who would go on to apply path-breaking tools of analytical logic to the criticism of literature.

In 1902 Ramsey married (Mary) Agnes (1875-1927), daughter of Rev. Plumpton Stravenson Wilson, vicar of Horbling, Lincs. and sister to the footballers Charles and Geoffrey Plumpton Wilson. Mary herself was academically accomplished, having earned a Class II Honours Certificate in Modern History from St Hugh's College, Oxford. In April 1913, Mary stood for election to the Cambridge Board of Guardians in Bridge Ward, and was elected with 321 votes.

Ramsey and his wife had two daughters, Bridget and Margaret, and two sons, philosopher and mathematician Frank Plumpton Ramsey (1903–1930) and Michael Ramsey (1904–1988) who was the Archbishop of Canterbury for thirteen years. Mary Agnes was killed in 1927 in a road traffic accident.

He is buried in the Ascension Parish Burial Ground in Cambridge; his son Frank and wife Mary are buried in the same plot. His home, Howfield, Buckingham Road, is now part of Cambridge Blackfriars.

== Publications ==
- 1913: (with W. H. Besant) A Treatise on Hydromechanics from Google Books.
- 1956: An Introduction to the Theory of Newtonian Attraction, Cambridge University Press
