= Norman McLean =

British Semitic and Biblical scholar (1865–1947)

Norman McLean FBA (2 October 1865 – 20 August 1947) was a Scottish Semitic and Biblical scholar. He was born on 2 October 1865 at Lanark, the son of the Rev. Daniel McLean (1826–28), missionary to Jamaica and later minister of the UP church at Lanark, and Grace Whyte Millar of Loanhead (1831–1923). He was educated at the Royal High School and the University of Edinburgh, graduating MA in 1885. He entered Christ's College, Cambridge, taking a First Class Honours degree in Classics (1889) and in the Semitic Languages Tripos (1893). He took the Prize in Biblical Hebrew. In 1894, he became a Fellow and lecturer of Hebrew in Christ's and then a university lecturer in Aramaic (1903–31). He was a Tutor from 1911, and then a Master of Christ's from 1927 to 1936. Ill-health forced him to turn down the Vice-Chancellor's post. Responsible for a number of academic works, he spent forty years working on an edition of the Septuagint.

His life work lay within a field that philologically-equipped theologians had pursued relentlessly since the seventeenth century: the establishment of a complete variorum edition of the scriptural texts. McLean, whose background was devoutly Presbyterian, spent forty years working on an edition of the Septuagint. He was elected FBA in 1934. He was a member of the Cambridge Apostles, a secret society, from 1888.

In 1896 he married Grace Luce in Malmesbury; there were no children.

McLean is buried in the Parish of the Ascension Burial Ground in Cambridge, with his wife Mary, née Luce, who died in 1905.
