= Margaret Heitland =

British journalist and suffragist

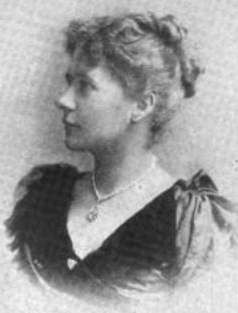
- In The Sketch, 8 April 1896
- Born: Margaret Bateson; 27 February 1860; Cambridge, England
- Died: 31 May 1938 (aged 78); Cambridge, England
- Burial place: Ascension Parish Burial Ground
- Occupations: Journalist, activist
- Spouse: William Emerton Heitland (m. 1901; died 1935)
- Parents: William Henry Bateson (father); Anna Bateson (mother)
- Relatives: William Bateson (brother); Anna Bateson (botanist) (sister); Mary Bateson (sister); Gregory Bateson (nephew); Mary Catherine Bateson (grandniece)

Margaret Heitland (née Bateson; 27 February 1860 – 31 May 1938) was a British journalist and social activist (suffragette).

== Biography ==
She was born in Cambridge on 27 February 1860, the daughter of William Henry Bateson, master of St John's College, and Anna Bateson. In 1901 she married William Emerton Heitland, classicist and fellow of St John's.

She was sister of the geneticist William Bateson, whose son was the anthropologist and cyberneticist Gregory Bateson, and sister of the historian Mary Bateson and botanist Anna Bateson.

She died at her home in Cambridge on 31 May 1938, and is buried in the Ascension Parish Burial Ground, Cambridge.

== Career ==
Margaret, her two sisters, Anna and Mary Bateson, and their mother Anna Aitkin were involved with the women's suffrage movement. Margaret was interested in journalism which she began pursuing in 1886. She then began working for The Queen where she stayed for the majority of her career. In 1888, she organized a campaign of meetings for the Women's Suffrage Society and in 1895 she published Professional Women upon their Professions: Conversations. In 1913 she became president of the Cambridge Women's Suffrage Association, a member of the National Union of Women's Suffrage Societies Executive committee and vice president of the Central Bureau for the Employment of Women. In 1912, as a member of the National Union of Women's Suffrage Societies, she wrote a letter to Maud Arncliffe Sennett stating that both men and women should have the opportunity to live in better conditions than they did. In 1920, she was a member of the standing committee of the Cambridge Branch of the National Union of Societies for Equal Citizenship still in hopes of political equality.
