= James Clackson =

British Indo-Europeanist (born 1966)

- Born: 13 September 1966 (age 60); Gloucester, England
- Occupations: Philologist, Indo-Europeanist

Academic background
- Education: Loughborough Grammar School; Trinity College, Cambridge

James Peter Timothy Clackson (born 13 September 1966) is a British linguist and Indo-Europeanist. He is a professor of Comparative Philology at the Faculty of Classics, University of Cambridge, and a Fellow and Director of Studies at Jesus College, Cambridge.

== Biography ==
Clackson was born on 13 September 1966 in Gloucester. His father is Andrew Peter Clackson and his mother is Anne Claire Clackson (née Bramley). He attended Loughborough Grammar School and then Trinity College, Cambridge, where he received his BA in 1988, his MA, and his PhD in 1992. While at the University of Cambridge, Clackson studied under Robert Coleman. His Ph.D. thesis served as a basis for his 1994 book The Linguistic Relationship between Armenian and Greek. His research interests include ancient languages of the Italian peninsula (Latin, Sabellian, Etruscan), Indo-European linguistics, Latin linguistics, Greek linguistics and Armenian.

He was a junior research fellow at Trinity College, Cambridge from 1991 to 1995, a lecturer in classics at the University of Cambridge from 1997 to 2012, and a reader in Comparative Philology from 2012 to 2016. Since 1998, he has been a fellow of Jesus College, Cambridge. He was awarded a Philip Leverhulme Prize in 2001. He is currently the editor of the Transactions of the Philological Society, the oldest scholarly journal devoted to the study of language that has an unbroken tradition.

Clackson is the current Secretary of the Friends of the Parish of the Ascension Burial Ground, where there is a memorial to his first wife, Sarah Clackson, who died in 2003. He has been married to the sociologist Veronique Mottier since 2005.

== Publications ==
Books

- The Linguistic Relationship between Armenian and Greek (Oxford, 1994)
- Indo-European Word Formation (co-edited with Birgit Anette Olsen, Copenhagen, 2004)
- The Blackwell History of the Latin Language (with Geoff Horrocks, Oxford, 2007)
- Indo-European Linguistics: An Introduction (Cambridge, 2007)
- A Companion to the Latin Language (editor, Malden MA, 2011)
- Language and Society in the Greek and Roman Worlds (Cambridge, 2015)

Others

- Clackson, J. and Meißner, T. eds, (2002) Nominal Composition in Indo-European Languages. Transactions of the Philological Society, Vol. 100, issues 2–3.
- Clackson, J. with A. Boud'hors, C. Louis, and P. Sijpesteijn eds, (2009) Monastic Estates in Late Antique and Early Islamic Egypt, Durham: American Society of Papyrologists.
- Clackson, J., (2013) 'The Origin of the Indic Languages: The Indo-European Model' in Angela Marcantonio and Girish Nath Jha (eds.) Perspectives on the origin of Indian civilization, New Delhi, 259–287. Published by Center for Indic Studies and D.K. Printworld (P) Ltd.
