= John Burnaby (priest) =

The Reverend John Burnaby
- Born: 28 July 1891
- Died: 6 March 1978 (aged 86)
- Spouse: Dorothy Helen Burnaby

Ecclesiastical career
- Church: Church of England
- Ordained: 1942 (priest)

Academic background
- Education: Trinity College, Cambridge

Academic work
- Discipline: Theology
- Institutions: Trinity College, Cambridge

John Burnaby (28 July 1891 – 6 March 1978) was an Anglican priest and Regius Professor of Divinity at the University of Cambridge.

Burnaby was educated at Haileybury College and Trinity College, Cambridge, where he graduated in classics and won the Chancellor's Classical Medal in 1914. He was married to Dorothy Helen Burnaby, née Lock, the sister of Robert Heath Lock. He is buried with his wife in the Parish of the Ascension Burial Ground in Cambridge.

At one point Burnaby was appointed as one of Ludwig Wittgenstein's literary executors but he was later replaced.
