= William Henry Bateson =

English academic (1812–1881)

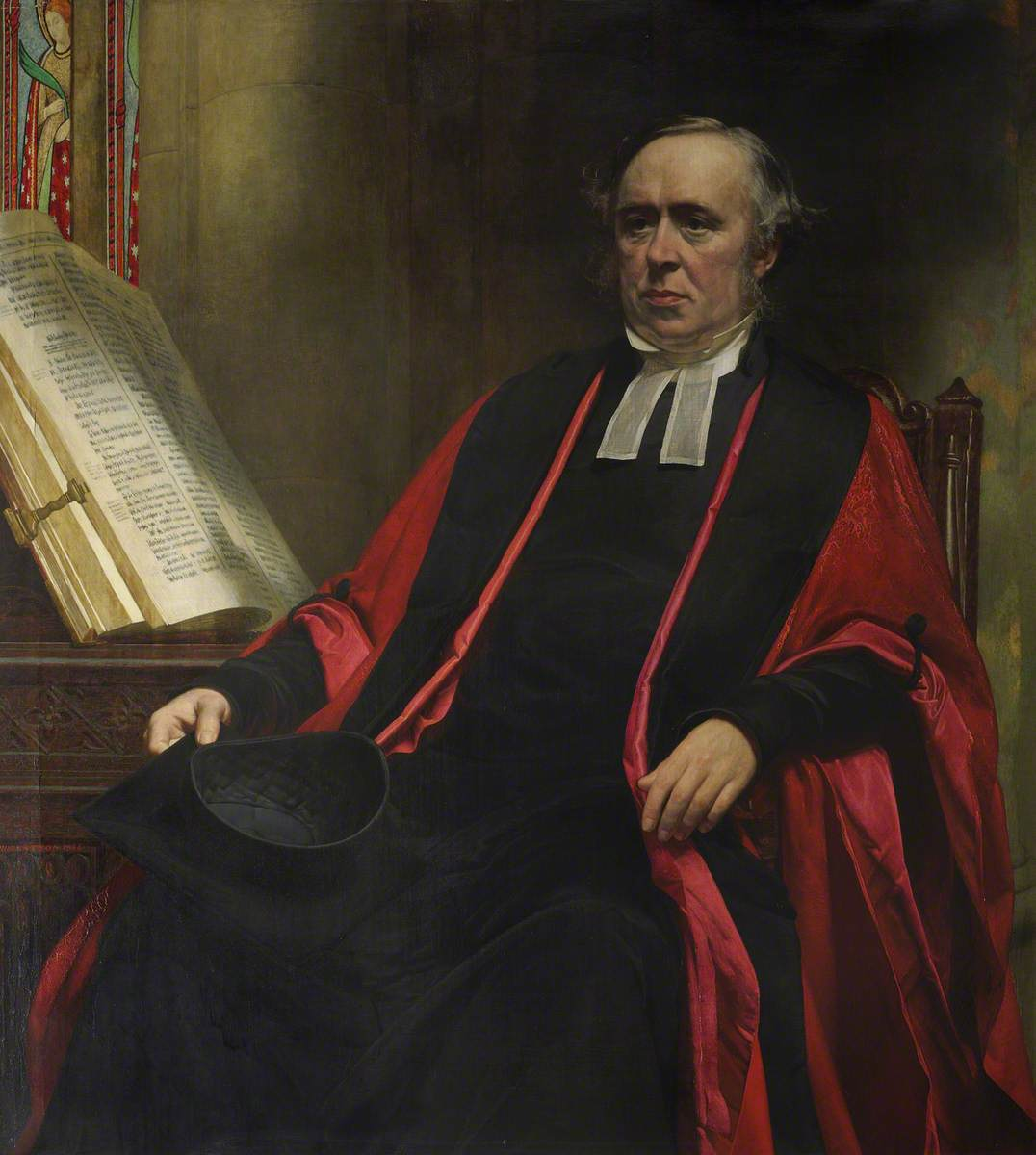
William Henry Bateson

William Henry Bateson (3 June 1812, Liverpool – 27 March 1881, Cambridge) was a British academic, who served as Master of St John's College, Cambridge.

== Life ==
The son of Richard Bateson, a Liverpool merchant, Bateson was educated at Shrewsbury School under Samuel Butler, and at St John's College, Cambridge, being admitted in 1829, matriculating in 1831, graduating B.A. (3rd classic) 1836, M.A. 1839, B.D. 1846, D.D. (per lit. reg.) 1857.

He trained as a lawyer, teacher, and clergyman: he was admitted to Lincoln's Inn in 1836, was second master at the Proprietary School in Leicester in 1837, and was ordained deacon in 1839 and priest in 1840. He was chaplain at Horningsea (1840–43) and Vicar of Madingley (1843–47).

He gained a Fellowship at St John's in 1837, and served as Rede Lecturer (1841), Senior Bursar (1846–57), and Public Orator (1848–57). He was appointed Master of St John's in 1857, continuing as Master until his death in 1881. In 1858–59 he was Vice-Chancellor of the University of Cambridge.

Bateson was a governor of Rugby School, Shrewsbury School and The Perse School, and actively promoted the higher education of women.

== Family ==
His wife Anna Bateson, née Aikin, was a founding member of the Cambridge Women's Suffrage Association and encouraged St John's College to give land for the foundation of Newnham College, Cambridge.

He was the father of the geneticist William Bateson, the journalist and suffragist Margaret Heitland, the historian Mary Bateson and the botanist and gardener Anna Bateson, and the grandfather of cyberneticist Gregory Bateson.

Academic offices
Preceded by Ralph Tatham	Master of St John's College, Cambridge; 1857–1881	Succeeded by Charles Taylor
Preceded by Henry Philpott	Vice-Chancellor of the University of Cambridge; 1858–1859	Succeeded by Latimer Neville
