= Anna Bateson =

English suffragist (c.1830–1918)

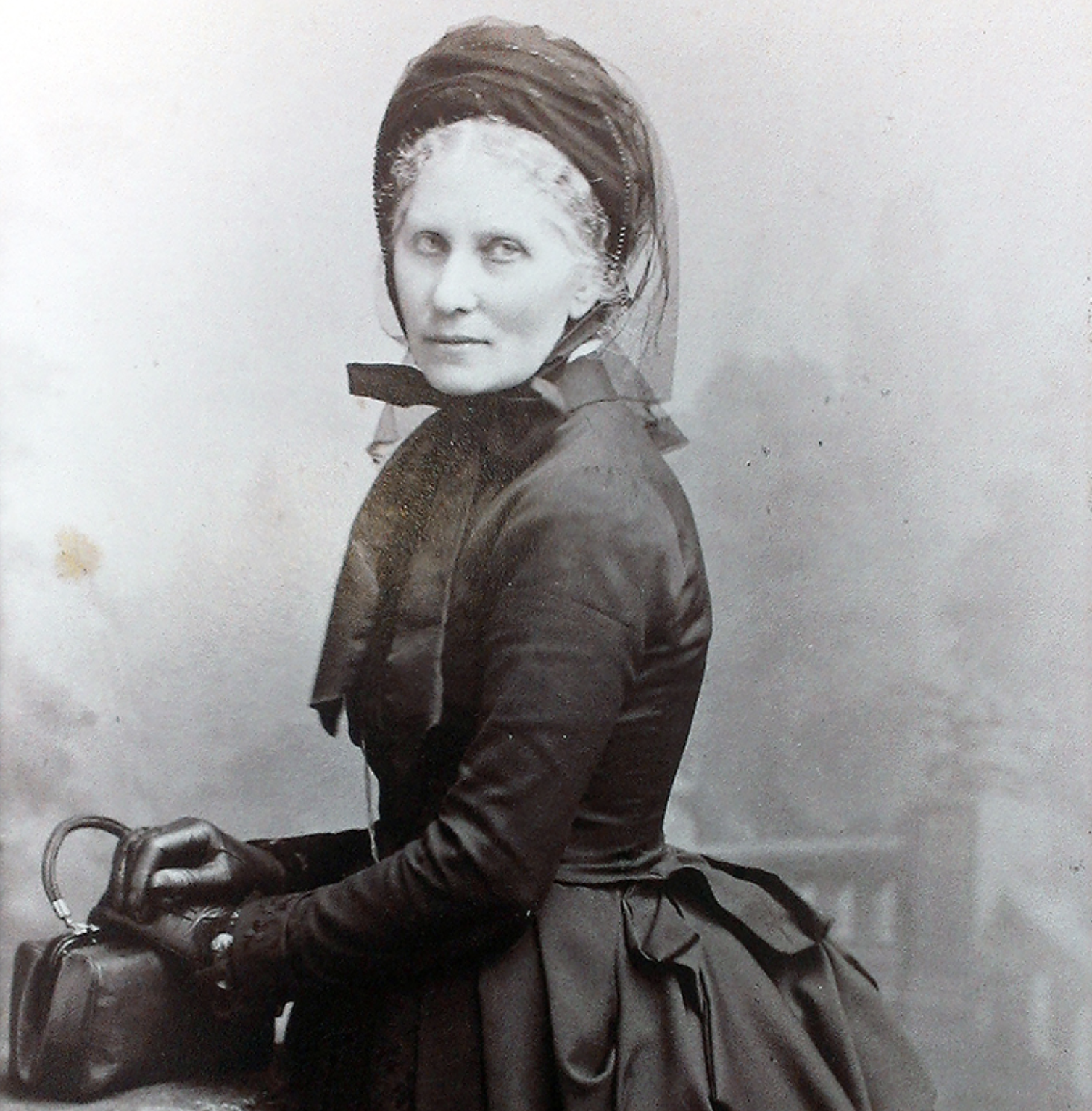
- Anna Bateson in 1875
- Born: Anna Aikin or Aiken c. 1830
- Died: 1918
- Occupations: Suffragist and women's activist
- Spouse: William Henry Bateson
- Children: Margaret Heitland; William Bateson; Anna Bateson (botanist); Mary Bateson
- Father: James Aikin
- Relatives: William Emerton Heitland (son-in-law); Gregory Bateson (grandson); Margaret Mead (granddaughter-in-law); Mary Catherine Bateson (great-granddaughter)

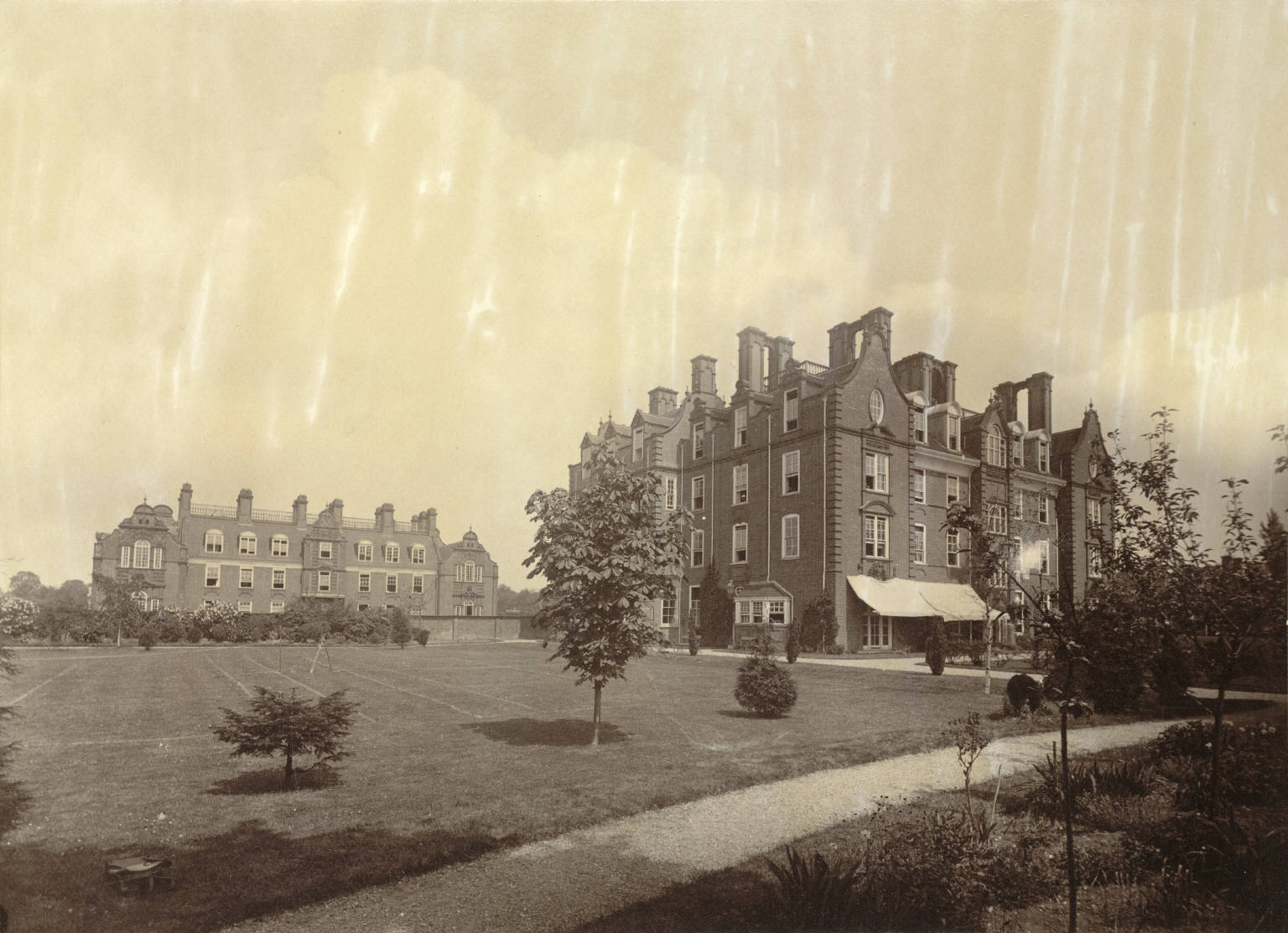
Newnham College's first building was on its Sidgwick Avenue Site in 1875, which is still the main premises of the college today.

Anna Bateson (née Aikin or Aiken, c. 1830 – 1918) was an English suffragist who aided with the foundation of Newnham College, Cambridge.

== Early life and family ==
Born about 1830 to James Aikin of Liverpool, she married William Henry Bateson, Master of St John's College, Cambridge. Four of her children – botanist Anna Bateson, geneticist William Bateson, journalist Margaret Heitland, and historian Mary Bateson – were all active in the women's suffrage movement.

== Newnham College ==
In 1875, Anna encouraged St John's College to lend land for the first building of Newnham College. She served on the first governing body of the college from 1880 to 1885.

== Suffragist and liberal activism ==
In 1884, along with Millicent Fawcett, Kathleen Lyttelton, and her daughter Anna Bateson, she founded the Cambridge Women's Suffrage Association. She was its secretary until 1890 and also sat on the executive committee of the Central National Society.

She was president of the Cambridge Women's Liberal Society and an active speaker for the Women's Liberal Federation, where she served as vice-president.

== Death and legacy ==
She died in 1918.

Newnham College has an Anna Bateson Room.
