= Sarah Clackson =

British coptologist (1965–2003)

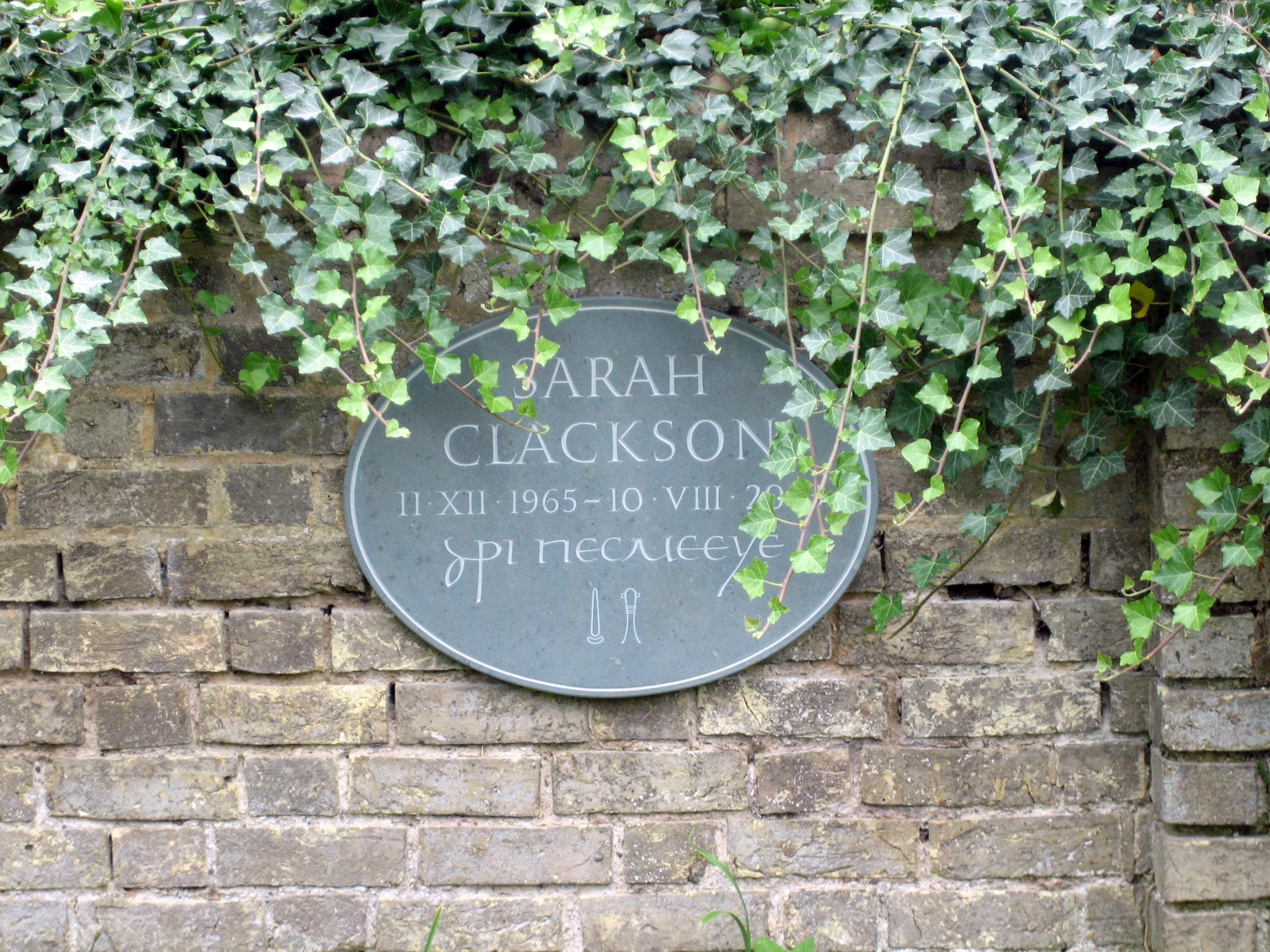
Memorial to Sarah Clackson in Ascension Parish Burial Ground, Cambridge.

Sarah Joanne Clackson (née Quinn) (11 December 1965 – 10 August 2003) was a British Coptologist.

Born in Leicester, she was educated at Loughborough High School and St John's College, Cambridge where she studied classics and Egyptology. She obtained a PhD from University College London in 1996. This resulted in her first major book, Coptic and Greek texts Relating to the Hermopolite Monastery of Apa Apollo (2000). At the same time, she was working as Project Officer for the Manichaean Documentation Centre based first at the Institute of Classical Studies, London, and then at Warwick University.

== Publications ==
The Elephantine Papyri in English (1996) bears her name among its authors, as does The Dictionary of Manichaean Texts, volume i, Texts from the Roman Empire (1998). After Coptic and Greek Texts in 2000, she published Our Father who writes: orders from the Monastery of Apollo at Bawit, was published in 2008. Papyrus grecs et coptes de Baouît conserves au Musée du Louvre was published in 2014 (jointly edited with Alain Delattre). A memorial volume, Monastic Estates in Late Antique and Early Islamic Egypt. Ostraca, Papyri, and Essays in Memory of Sarah Clackson (P. Clackson), edited by Anne Boud’hors, James Clackson, Catherine Louis, and Petra Sijpesteijn, was published in 2009.

She held the Eugénie Strong Fellowship in Arts at Girton College (1996–98) and the Lady Wallis Budge Fellowship in Egyptology at Christ's College (from 1998).

Her papers are held at the Griffith Institute in Oxford.

== Family ==
She married fellow Old Loughburian and Cambridge academic James Clackson in 1991.

== Death and legacy ==
She was diagnosed with cancer in 1998 and died on 10 August 2003. Her funeral took place at the West Chapel, Cambridge Crematorium on 19 August 2003.

Her memorial is at the Ascension Parish Burial Ground in Cambridge.

A fund in her name, Sarah (J.) Clackson Coptic Fund, enables scholars to access her papers, which are held in the Archive of the Griffith Institute, Oxford, and to further her work in Coptic and papyrology.
