= Anna Bateson (botanist) =

English botanist and suffragist (1863–1928)

- Born: 1863
- Died: 1928 (aged 64–65)
- Education: Newnham College, Cambridge
- Known for: Co-founder of Cambridge Women's Suffrage Association; One of Britain's first women commercial gardeners
- Parents: William Henry Bateson (father); Anna Bateson (mother)
- Relatives: Margaret Heitland (sister); William Bateson (brother); Mary Bateson (sister); Gregory Bateson (nephew); Mary Catherine Bateson (grandniece)
- Awards: Bathurst studentship
- Scientific career
- Fields: Botany
- Workplaces: Balfour Biological Laboratory for Women
- Academic advisors: Francis Darwin

Anna Bateson (1863 – 1928) was an English botanist, market gardener, and suffragist. After working as an assistant in botany at Newnham College, Cambridge, where she and her mother (also named Anna Bateson) campaigned for women's suffrage, she moved to New Milton, Hampshire and set up a pioneering market gardening business.

== Early life and family ==
Bateson was born in 1863, the eldest of seven children of William Henry Bateson, Master of St John’s College, Cambridge, and his wife Anna, née Aikin. Her siblings included geneticist William Bateson and fellow suffragists Mary Bateson and Margaret Heitland. She was educated at home and at a day school in Cambridge, apart from a year spent in Karlsruhe, Germany.

== Botany ==
From 1884–6 Anna studied natural sciences at Newnham College, Cambridge. The following year, she was appointed an assistant in botany at the newly established Balfour Biological Laboratory for Women, and served as research assistant to Francis Darwin in the University Botany Laboratory, 1886–90. She held a Bathurst studentship and worked as an assistant demonstrator at the College. She published papers on turgescent pith and on geotropism, both solo and as co-author with Francis Darwin and with her brother.

=== Solo publications ===
- 'The effect of cross-fertilisation on inconspicuous flowers', Ann. Bot. 1 (1888), 255-61
- 'On the change of shape exhibited by turgescent pith in water', Ann. Bot. 4 (1889), 117-25

=== With Francis Darwin ===
- 'The effect of stimulation on turgescent vegetable tissues', Linnean Society Journal 24 (1888), 1-27
- 'On a method of studying geotropism', Ann. Bot. 2 (1888) 65-8
- 'On the change of shape in turgescent pith', Cambridge Phil. Soc. Proceedings 6 (1889), 358-9

=== With William Bateson ===
- 'On variations in the floral symmetry of certain plants having irregular corollas', Linnean Society Journal 28 (1891), 386-424

== Suffragism ==
In 1884, Bateson was a co-founder, with her mother and with Millicent Fawcett and Kathleen Lyttelton, of the Cambridge Women’s Suffrage Association. She spent five years on its executive committee, representing it at a meeting of the Central Committee of the National Society for Women's Suffrage in 1888.

After moving to New Milton, Hampshire in 1890, she became secretary of the New Forest Women's Suffrage Society.

== Gardening ==
In Hampshire, despite describing herself as 'town-bred' and 'entirely without knowledge of the horticultural trade', she became an apprentice market gardener for two years with a family in South Wales, and then set up her own nursery garden in New Milton in 1892, which she ran for the remaining thirty-six years of her life. She was noted as an early woman professional in the field of market gardening, with some sources stating that she was Britain's first.

== Civic and personal life ==
Bateson was active in civic life. During World War I she served on the local Military Service Tribunal. She served as a Poor Law guardian, a school manager, a member of Lymington District Council, and as president of the local Women's Institute and district Nursing Association.

She died on 27 May 1928.
