= Stanley Stubbs (headmaster) =

Stanley Stubbs (19 February 1906 – 25 October 1976) was an English educationalist.

He was housemaster of day boys at Gresham's School from 1934 to 1939; headmaster of Soham Grammar School from 1940 to 1945, and of The Perse School, Cambridge from 1945 until 1969.

He is buried at the Parish of the Ascension Burial Ground in Cambridge, with his wife Margaret Eleanor Stubbs.
