= John Locke (disambiguation) =

John Locke (1632–1704) was an English philosopher.

John Locke or John Lock may also refer to:

- John Locke (author) (born 1951), American e-book writer of crime fiction and Westerns
- John Locke (Canadian politician) (1825–1873), Nova Scotia Senator, 1867–1873
- John Locke (Massachusetts politician) (1764–1855), member of the U.S. House of Representatives, 1823–1829
- John Locke (MP) (1805–1880), British member of parliament for Southwark, 1857–1880
- John Locke (musician) (1943–2006), former member of the jazz-hard rock band Spirit
- John Locke (naturalist) (1792–1856), American naturalist, professor, photographer, and publisher
- John Locke (poet) (1847–1889), Irish poet, novelist and journalist
- John A. Locke (born 1962), member of the Massachusetts House of Representatives from 1995 to 2003
- John Howard Locke (1923–1998), British civil servant
- John L. Locke, American biolinguist, psycholinguist, child phonologist
- John Locke (Lost), fictional character on the American television show Lost
- John Bascombe Lock (1849–1921), bursar of Gonville and Caius College, Cambridge

== See also ==
- Johnlock
- Locke (surname)
- Lock (surname)
