= Lock (surname) =

Lock is a surname, and may refer to:

- Bob Lock (born 1949), Welsh science fiction and fantasy writer
- Charles Lock (1770–1804), British consul-general in Naples who quarrelled with Admiral Horatio Nelson regarding the latter's military actions
- Charlie Lock (born 1962), Zimbabwean cricketer
- C. N. H. Lock (1894–1949), English aerodynamicist
- David Lock (born 1960), barrister and Labour Party politician in the United Kingdom
- Don Lock (1936–2017), Major League Baseball outfielder
- Drew Lock (born 1996), American football quarterback
- Édouard Lock (born 1954), Canadian dance choreographer
- Emily Lock (born 2007), British gymnast
- Eric Lock (1919–1941), British Royal Air Force fighter ace of the Second World War
- Herbert Lock (1887–1957), English goalkeeper who played for Southampton and Rangers
- James Lock (sound engineer) (1939–2009), English two-time Grammy Award winner in the area of classical music
- James Lock, an early owner (from 1759) and head of James Lock & Co., hatters in London
- John Bascombe Lock (1849–1921), bursar of Gonville and Caius College, Cambridge
- Matthias Lock, English 18th-century furniture designer and cabinetmaker
- Mi Kwan Lock, French actress
- Patti Frazer Lock (born 1953), American mathematician and statistician
- Ray Lock, a Royal Air Force air vice-marshal
- Robert Heath Lock (1879–1915), English geneticist
- Sean Lock (1963–2021), English comedy writer, comedian and actor
- Tony Lock (1929–1995), English Test cricketer
- Trevor Lock (born 1973), English comedian, actor and playwright
- Ulla Lock (1934–2012), Danish film actress

== See also ==
- Locke (surname)
- George Locks (1889–1965), English cricketer
