= Joseph Locke (disambiguation) =

Joseph Locke (1805–1860) was a British civil engineer particularly associated with railway projects.

Joseph Locke may also refer to:

- Joe Locke (born 2003; Joseph William Locke), a Manx actor
- Joe Locke (musician) (born 1959; Joseph Paul Locke), an American jazz vibraphonist and composer
- Josef Locke (1917–1999; born Joseph McLaughlin), an Irish popular singer of the 1940s and 1950s
- Joseph Locke, penname of Ray Garton (1962–2024), an American author

== See also ==
- Joey Locke, a fictional character from Cleaner (2025 film)
- All pages with titles containing "Joseph" and "Locke"
- Joseph (given name)
- Joseph (disambiguation)
- Locke (surname)
- Locke (disambiguation)
