= Phase lag (rotorcraft) =

In the aerodynamics of rotorcraft like helicopters, phase lag refers to the angular difference between the point at which a control input to a rotor blade occurs and the point of maximum displacement of the blade in response to that control input. This displacement occurs in the direction of rotor rotation. Phase lag may vary depending on rotor tilt rate, ratio of aerodynamic damping to blade inertial forces (Lock number), offset of flapping hinge from axis of rotation (e/R ratio), and coupling of blade flap, drag, and feather motions, and often results in cross-coupling between the aircraft control axes. Phase lag is a property of all rotating systems acted upon by a periodic force.

Because of phase lag, rolling a rotorcraft to the left or right would theoretically require a forward or backward cyclic if there were no mechanical correction. The rotor control system is angularly shifted as much as necessary to compensate for phase-lag and provide helicopter response that matches movement of the cyclic stick.

Phase lag is not caused by gyroscopic precession, which always has a lag of 90°. Rather, the amount of phase lag depends on the distance of the flapping hinge from the rotor hub. In two-blade teetering rotors, phase lag is exactly 90° because the blades flap about a point that always stays at or near the rotor mast. In fully-articulated rotors with mechanical hinges, where the hinges are offset from the rotor mast, phase lag will be 80–90°. Hingeless and bearingless rotors will typically have phase lag of 75–80°.

The transverse flow effect results in a roll due to phase lag.

Phase lag is not to be confused with advance angle, which refers to the mechanically fixed angle between the pitch link attachments at the blade and the swashplate. Advance angle is fixed and cannot vary.

== See also ==
- Helicopter rotor
- Helicopter flight controls
- Unequal rotor lift distribution
