= Pitch-up =

Uncommanded nose-upwards rotation of an aircraft

In aerodynamics, pitch-up is an uncommanded nose-upwards rotation of an aircraft. It is an undesirable characteristic that has been observed mostly in experimental swept-wing aircraft at high subsonic Mach numbers or high angle of attack.

== History ==
Pitch-up problems were first noticed on high-speed test aircraft with swept wings. It was a common problem on the Douglas Skyrocket, which was used extensively to test the problem.

Before the pitch-up phenomenon was well understood, it plagued all early swept-wing aircraft. In the F-100 Super Sabre it even got its own name, the Sabre dance. In aircraft with high-mounted tailplanes, like the F-101 Voodoo, recovery was especially difficult because the tailplane was placed directly in the wing wake during the pitch-up, causing deep stall (although the T-tail was meant to prevent pitch-up from starting in the first place). Deployment of the braking parachute and a considerable height above the ground were essential for a chance at recovery.

== Description ==
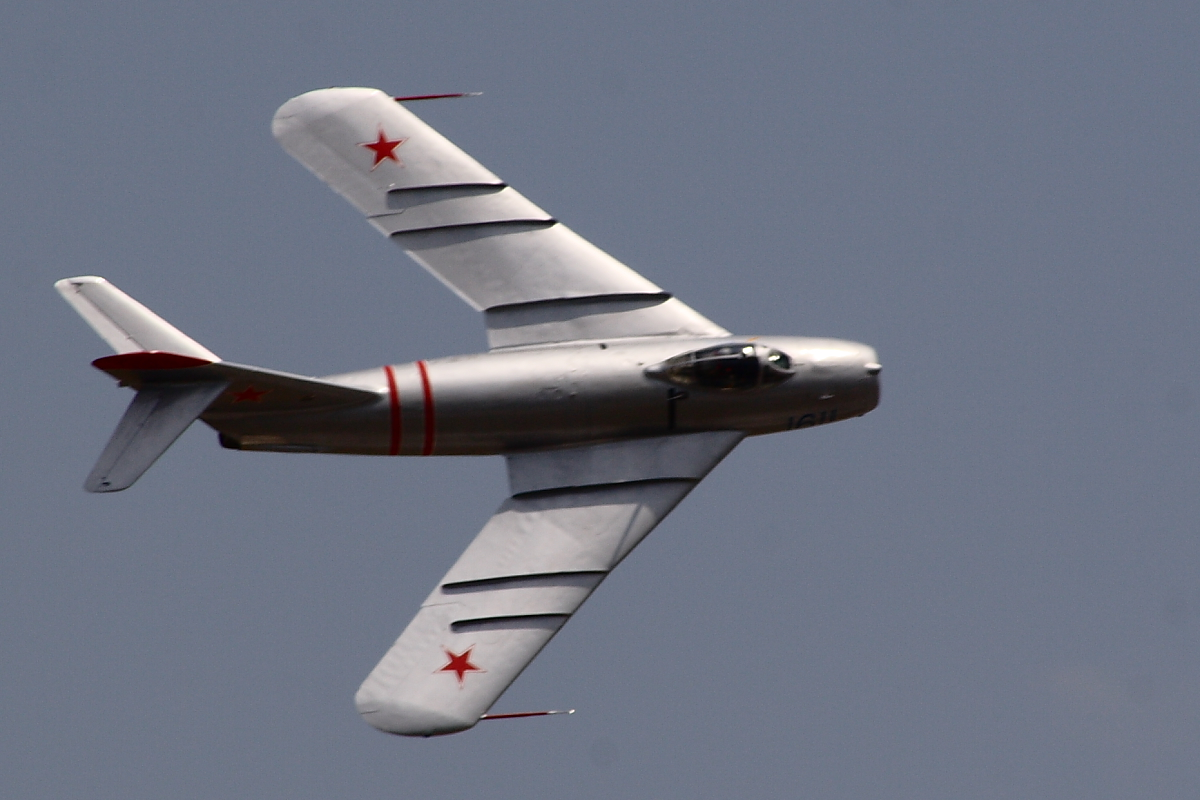
The MiG-17 mounts its wing forward in order to place the center of pressure near the balance point of the aircraft. To control span wise flow, it included prominent wing fences.

Wings generate pressure distributions on their upper and lower surfaces which produce a single force acting at a point known as the "center of pressure", or CoP, which is normally located between ⅓ and ½ of the way back from the leading edge. This upward and rearward leaning force is replaced by an equivalent pair of forces called lift and drag. The longitudinal position at which these forces act and the magnitude of the forces change with angle of attack. In addition a varying pitching moment exists for any force location other than the CoP. These changes lead to a requirement to trim aircraft as they change their speed or power settings.

Another major consideration for aircraft design is a vector addition of all of the weight terms of the parts of the aircraft, including the wing. This too can be reduced to a single weight term acting at some point along the longitudinal axis of the aircraft, the "center of gravity", or CoG. If the wing is positioned so its CoP lies near CoG for the aircraft, in level flight the wing will lift the aircraft straight up. This reduces any net forces pitching the aircraft up or down, but for a number of reasons the two points are normally slightly separated and a small amount of force from the flight control surfaces is used to balance this out.

The same basic layout is desirable for an aircraft with a swept wing as well. On a conventional rectangular wing, the CoP meets the aircraft at the point on the chord running directly out from the root. While the same analysis will reveal a center of pressure point for a swept wing, its location may be considerably behind the leading edge measured at the root of the wing. For highly swept planforms, the CoP may lie behind the trailing edge of the wing root, requiring the wing to meet the aircraft at a seemingly far-forward location.

In this case of a swept wing, changes to the CoP with angle of attack may be magnified.

The introduction of swept wings took place during a move to more highly tapered designs as well. Although it had long been known that an elliptical planform is "perfect" from an induced drag standpoint, it was also noticed that a linear taper of the wing had much the same effect, while being lighter. Research during the war led to widespread use of taper, especially in the post-war era. However, it had been noticed early on that such designs had unfavourable stall characteristics; as the tips were more highly loaded in high angles of attack, they operated closer to their stall point.

Although this effect was unfavourable in a conventional straight wing aircraft, on a swept-wing design it had unexpected and dangerous results. When the tips stall on a swept wing, the center of pressure, the average lift point for the wing as a whole, moves forward. This is because the section still generating considerable lift is further forward. This causes further nose-up force, increasing the angle of attack and causing more of the tip area to stall. This may lead to a chain reaction that causes violent nose-up pitching of the aircraft.

This effect first noticed in the Douglas D-558-2 Skyrocket in August 1949, when a 0.6 G turn suddenly increased out of control to 6 G. This was not entirely surprising; the effect had been seen earlier in wind tunnel simulations. These effects can be seen at any speed; in the Skyrocket they occurred primarily in the transonic (the Weil-Gray criteria) but with more highly swept and tapered planforms, like on the North American F-100 Super Sabre, the effect was common at low speeds as well (the Furlong-McHugh boundary), when the aircraft flew at higher angles of attack in order to maintain lift at low speeds.

In addition, swept wings tend to generate span wise flow of the boundary layer, causing some of the airflow to move "sideways" along the wing. This occurs all along the wing, but as one moves towards the tip the sideways flow increases, as it includes both the contribution of the wing at that point, as well as span wise flow from points closer to the root. This effect takes time to build up, at higher speeds the span wise flow tends to be blown off the back of the wing before it has time to become serious. At lower speeds, however, this can lead to a considerable buildup of the boundary layer at the wing tip, adding to the problems noted above.

Finally, while not directly related to the effects above, it was common during the early jet age to use T-tail designs in order to keep the aerodynamic surfaces well clear of the jet engine area. In this case it is possible for a pitch-up event to cause the turbulent air behind the wing to flow across the horizontal stabilizer, making it difficult or impossible to apply nose-down pressure to counteract the pitch-up. Aircraft with low-mounted tail surfaces did not suffer from this effect, and in fact improved their control authority as the wing's wake cleared the controls surfaces, flowing above it. This was not always enough to correct for the problem, however; the F-86 continued to suffer from pitch-up in spite of increasing nose-down pressure from the tail surfaces.

== Mitigation ==
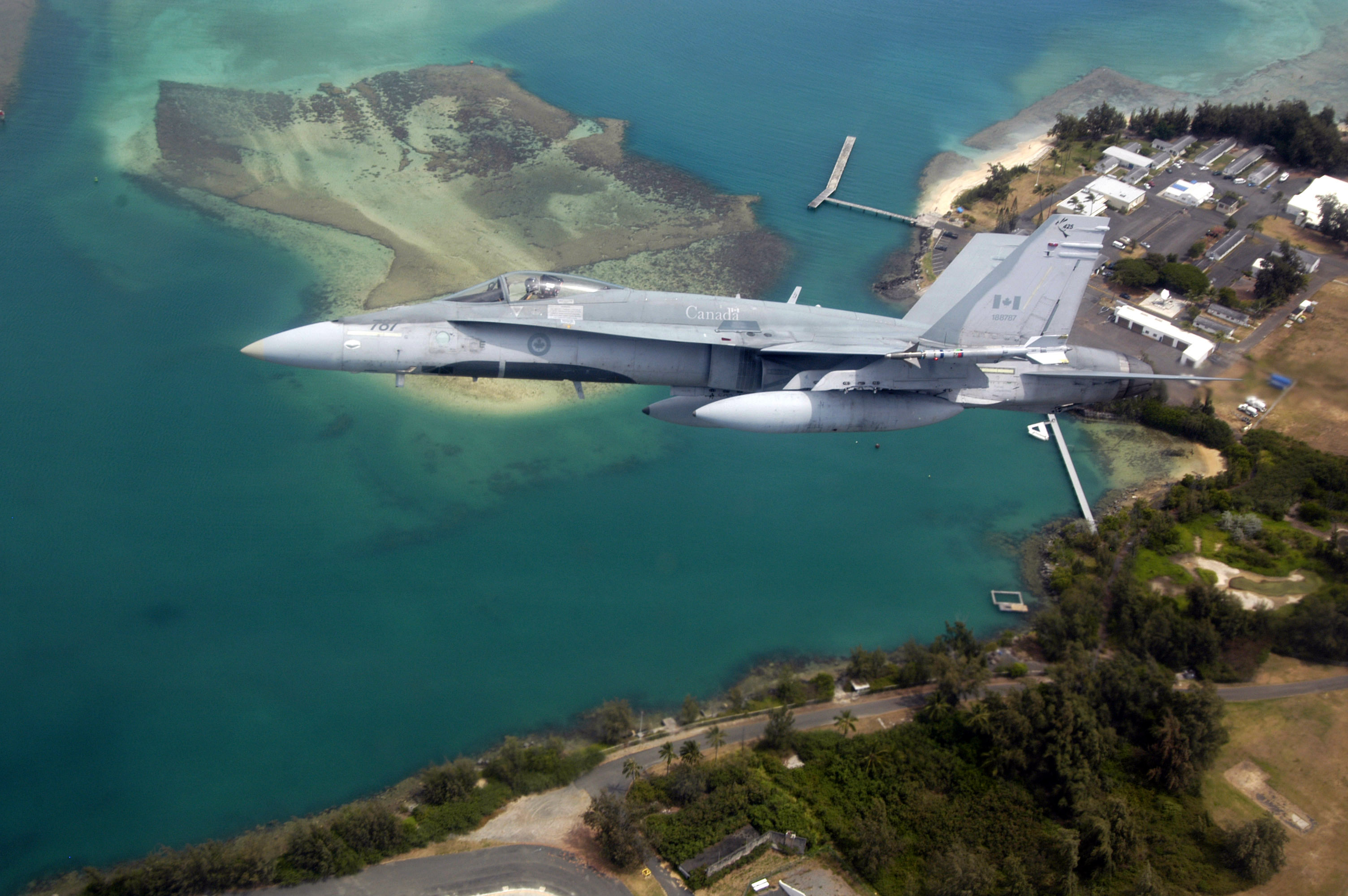
Washout is clearly visible in this image of a CF-18 Hornet. Note the angle of the Sidewinder missile on the wingtip rail as compared to the angle of incidence of the wing where it is attached to the fuselage.

As the primary causes of the pitch-up problem are due to spanwise flow and more loading at the tips, measures to address these issues can eliminate the problem. In early designs these were typically "add-ons" to an otherwise conventional wing planform, but in modern designs this is part of the overall wing design and normally controlled via the existing high-lift devices.

The first known attempt to address these problems took place on the platform where they were first noticed, the Douglas Skyrocket. This took the form of a series of vortex generators added to the outboard portions of the wing, breaking up the boundary layer. However, this was found to have almost no effect in practice. Nevertheless, a similar solution was attempted on the Boeing B-47 Stratojet where it proved considerably more effective. This may have been helped by the presence of the podded engines, whose vertical mountings acted as barriers to span wise flow.

More common solutions to the problem of spanwise flow is the use of a wing fence or the related dogtooth notch on the leading edge of the wing. This disrupts the flow and re-directs it rearward, while also causing the buildup of stagnant air inboard to lower the stall point. This does have an effect on overall airflow on the wing, and is generally not used where the sweep is mild.

To address the problems with spanwise loading, a wider variety of techniques have been used, including dedicated slats or flaps, the use of washout or automated control of the ailerons. An unusual solution tried on the XF-91 Thunderceptor prototype fighter was to give the wingtips a wider chord than the wing roots. The idea was to increase wingtip efficiency and cause the wing roots to stall first.

Angle of attack sensors on the aircraft can also detect when the angle of attack approaches the attitude known to result in pitch-up and activate devices like the stick shaker to warn the pilot, and the stick pusher which overpowers the pilot and forces the nose of the aircraft down to a safer angle of attack. Twist or washout built into the wingtips can also alleviate pitch-up. In effect, the angle of attack at the wingtip becomes smaller than elsewhere on the wing, meaning that the inboard portions of the wing will stall first.

A commonly used solution to pitch-up in modern combat aircraft is to use a control-canard. Another modern solution to pitch-up is the use of slats. When slats are extended they increase wing camber and increase maximum lift coefficient.

Pitch-up is also possible in aircraft with forward-swept wings as used on the Grumman X-29. With forward-swept wings the span wise flow is inboard, causing the wing root to stall before the wingtip. Although at first glance it would appear that this would cause pitch-down problems, the extreme rear mounting of the wing means that when the root stalls the lift moves forward, towards the tips.

== Sabre dance ==
When a swept wing starts to stall, the outermost portions tend to stall first. Since these portions are behind the center of pressure, the overall lift force moves forward, pitching the nose of the aircraft upwards. This leads to a higher angle of attack and causes more of the wing to stall, which exacerbates the problem. The pilot often loses control, with fatal results at low altitude because there was insufficient time for the pilot to regain control or eject before hitting the ground. A large number of aircraft were lost to this phenomenon during landing, which left aircraft tumbling onto the runway, often in flames.

One of the most notorious incidents was the loss of F-100C-20-NA Super Sabre 54-1907 and its pilot during an attempted emergency landing at Edwards AFB, California on January 10, 1956. By chance, this particular incident was recorded in detail on 16 mm film by cameras set up to cover an unrelated test. The pilot fought desperately to regain control due to faulty landing technique, finally rolling and yawing to the right before striking the ground with the fuselage turned approximately 90 degrees to the line of flight. Anderson, 1993 states the F-100 was noticeably underpowered for its day and had very pronounced "backside" tendencies if airspeed was allowed to decay too much.

The brand new F-100C was flown by Lt. Barty R. Brooks, a native of Martha, Oklahoma and a Texas A&M graduate, of the 1708th Ferrying Wing, Detachment 12, Kelly AFB, Texas. The aircraft was one of three being delivered from North American's Palmdale plant to George AFB, California, but the nose gear pivot pin worked loose, allowing the wheel to swivel at random, so he diverted to Edwards, which had a longer runway. On approach, at a high angle of attack, the fighter exceeded its flight envelope, and, too far into stall condition, lost directional control with fatal results. These scenes were inserted in the movie The Hunters, starring Robert Mitchum and Robert Wagner, in the movie X-15 with actor Charles Bronson playing the pilot, and in the made for TV film Red Flag: The Ultimate Game, although in The Hunters and in Red Flag: The Ultimate Game, the aircraft supposedly represented were respectively an F-86 and an F-5E. The incident was also commemorated in the fighter pilot song "Give Me Operations" (set to the tune of the California Gold Rush song "What Was Your Name in the States?"):

"Don't give me a One-Double-Oh
To fight against friendly or foe
That old Sabre Dance
Made me crap in my pants
Don't give me a One-Double-Oh."

== See also ==
- Index of aviation articles
- Mach tuck
- Wing twist

== Bibliography ==
- Loftin, LK Jr. "Quest for performance: The evolution of modern aircraft. NASA SP-468".
