= Gandersheim =

Gandersheim can refer to either:

- Gandersheim Abbey, convent in Lower Saxony (9th century-1810)
- Bad Gandersheim, town in Lower Saxony, called Gandersheim until 1931
