= Locke (surname) =

Locke, sometimes spelled Lock or Lok, is a common Western surname of Germanic origin. It is also a Scottish surname and a romanization of the Chinese surname Luo.

== Origin ==
Locke has multiple origins and meanings, including:

- from Old English, as an occupational surname for locksmiths or lock keepers
- from Old English, Dutch, German, and English, as a toponym for one who had residence near an enclosure, particularly one that could be locked; a barrier, particularly that on a river; or a bridge
- from Old English and Old High German, as a name for one with curly hair.
- from a romanization of "Lok", the Cantonese pronunciation of the Chinese surname Luo 駱/骆.

Locke is also the surname of a Scottish clan, with historic roots and a family seat in Peeblesshire. Variations on this surname include Loch, Lock, Lochlair, and Locklair, among others.

== People with this surname ==
- Alain LeRoy Locke (1885–1954), African American educator, writer, and philosopher
- Alice Locke Pittman (1868-1936), American composer
- Brenda Locke (born 1955), Canadian mayor of Surrey, British Columbia
- David Locke (disambiguation), multiple people
- Dean Jewett Locke (1823–1887), physician, founder of Lockeford, California
- Edwin Locke (born 1938), American psychologist known for the goal-setting theory developed with G. Latham
- Felix Locke (born 1985), German politician
- Gary Locke (disambiguation), multiple people
- Geneva Locke (born 1988), Canadian actress
- George Locke (1870–1937), Canadian librarian
- Greg Locke (born 1976), American pastor, preacher, author, and executive film producer
- Harry M. Locke (1902–1974), American politician
- Harvey Locke (born 1959), Canadian conservationist
- Jeff Locke (disambiguation), multiple people
- Joe Locke (born 2003), a Manx actor
- Joe Locke (musician) (born 1959), an American jazz vibraphonist and composer
- John Locke (disambiguation), multiple people
- Josef Locke (1917–1999), an Irish tenor
- Joseph Locke (1805–1860), English civil engineer, particularly associated with railway projects
- Joseph Locke, penname of Ray Garton, an American author
- Keith Locke (born 1944), New Zealand Member of Parliament for the Green Party of Aotearoa, New Zealand
- Kevin Locke (disambiguation), multiple people
- Kimberley Locke (born 1978), competitor in second season of American Idol
- Les Locke (1934–c. 1996), Scottish footballer with Queens Park Rangers
- Lewis Locke (1835–1920), American Civil War Medal of Honor recipient.
- Matthew Locke (disambiguation), multiple people
- Michael "Pancho" Locke (born 1979), Welsh stunt performer and skateboarder
- Michael K. Locke (1952–2014), American politician
- P. J. Locke (born 1997), American football player
- Powhatan B. Locke (c. 1828–1868), Justice of the Territorial Supreme Court of Nevada
- Richard Adams Locke (1800–1871), 19th-century journalist and creator of the Great Moon Hoax
- Richard M. Locke (born 1959), American political scientist
- Ron Locke (1939–2024), American baseball player
- Roy James "Philip" Locke (1928–2004), English actor
- Sondra Locke (1944–2018), American actress
- Spencer Locke (born 1991), American actress
- William Locke (disambiguation), multiple people

== Fictional characters ==
- Locke, a pseudonym of Peter Wiggin's in novels by Orson Scott Card
- Locke, father of Knuckles the Echidna in the Sonic the Hedgehog comic books
- Locke Cole, a character in the video game Final Fantasy VI (FF3 in North America)
- Adam Locke, Nick "Havoc" Parker's commander in the video game Command & Conquer: Renegade
- Chōjin Locke, the main character of the manga Locke the Superman
- Jameson Locke, a character in the video game Halo 5: Guardians, Fireteam Osiris leader, former ONI operative
- John Locke (Lost), in the television series Lost
- Vernon Locke, supporting character, contractor, and current heist co-ordinator of Payday 2 and Payday 3
- Surname of several characters in the comic book series Locke & Key and the TV series Locke & Key (TV series)

== See also ==
- Lock (surname)
- Locke (disambiguation)
- Lok (disambiguation), which includes a list of people with the surname
