= Chart recorder =

Electromechanical recording device

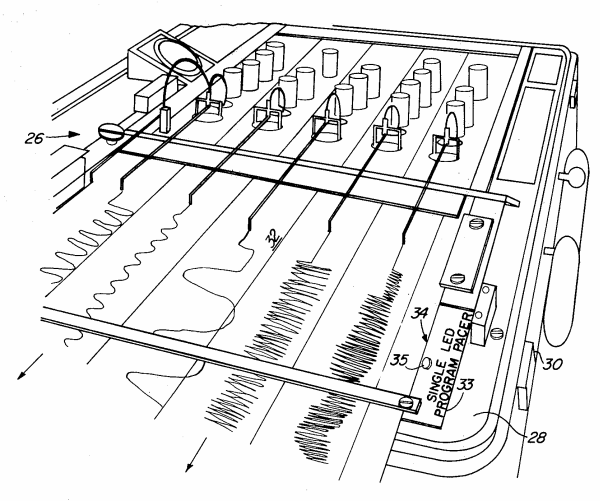
A chart recorder which is part of a polygraph

A circular chart recorder

A chart recorder is an electromechanical device that records an electrical or mechanical input trend onto a piece of paper (the chart). Chart recorders may record several inputs using different color pens and may record onto strip charts or circular charts. Chart recorders may be entirely mechanical with clockwork mechanisms, electro-mechanical with an electrical clockwork mechanism for driving the chart (with mechanical or pressure inputs), or entirely electronic with no mechanical components at all (a virtual chart recorder).

Chart recorders are built in three primary formats. Strip chart recorders have a long strip of paper that is ejected out of the recorder. Circular chart recorders have a rotating disc of paper that must be replaced more often, but are more compact and amenable to being enclosed behind glass. Roll chart recorders are similar to strip chart recorders except that the recorded data is stored on a round roll, and the unit is usually fully enclosed.

Chart recorders pre-dated electronic data loggers which have replaced them in many applications.

== Origins ==
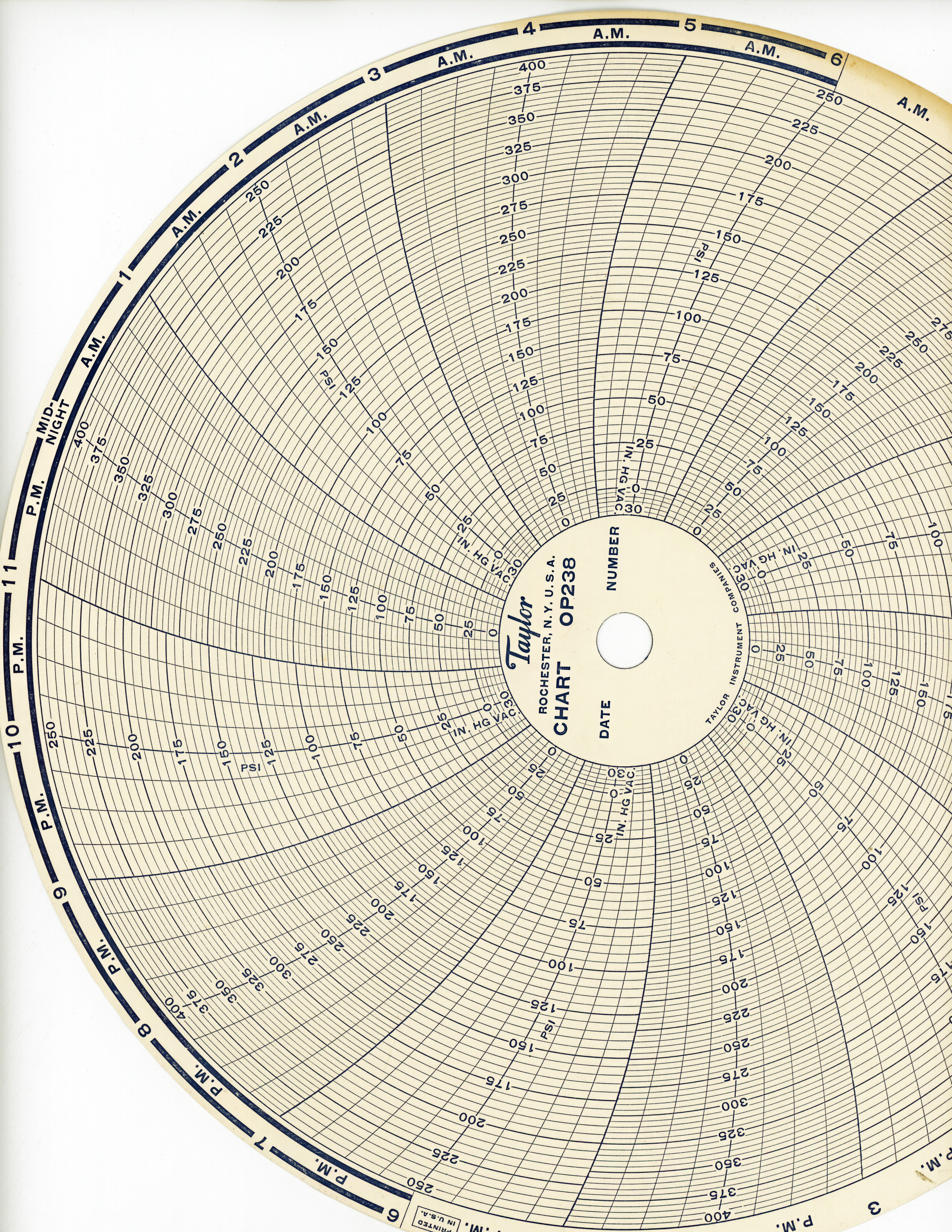
A section of circular chart recorder paper

Charles Babbage incorporated a chart recorder into the dynamometer car that he built in 1838 or 1839. Here is how he described it: "A roll of paper a thousand feet in length was slowly unwinding itself upon the long table ... About a dozen pens connected with a bridge crossing the middle of the table were each marking its own independent curve gradually or by jumps ..." The paper advance was geared to the wheels of the railroad carriage, while pens recorded time, the drawbar pull of the locomotive, and numerous other variables.

Part of Samuel Morse's telegraph system was an automatic recorder of the dots and dashes of the code, inscribed on a paper tape by a pen moved by an electromagnet, with a clockwork mechanism advancing the paper. In 1848-1850 a system of such registers was used by John Locke to improve the precision of astronomical observations of stars, providing timing precision much greater than previous methods. This method was adopted by astronomers in other countries as well. William Thomson, 1st Baron Kelvin's syphon recorder of 1858 was a sensitive instrument that provided a permanent record of telegraph signals through long underwater telegraph cables. These recorders came to be referred to as pen registers, although this term later became part of law enforcement jargon referring to the use of such a register to record dialed telephone numbers.

A patent for a 'Pressure Indicator and Recorder' was issued to William Henry Bristol, on September 18, 1888. Bristol went on to form the Bristol Manufacturing Company in 1889. The Bristol Company was acquired by Emerson Electric Company in March 2006, and continues to manufacture a number of different electro-mechanical chart recorders, as well as other instrumentation, measurement, and control products.

The first chart recorder for environmental monitoring was designed by American inventor J.C. Stevens while working for Leupold & Stevens in Portland, Oregon and was issued a patent for this design in 1915. Chart recorders are still used in applications where instant visual feedback is required or where users do not have the need, opportunity or technical ability to download and view data on a computer or where no electrical power is available (such as in hazardous zones on an oil rig or in remote ecological studies). However, dataloggers' decreasing cost and power requirements allow them to increasingly replace chart recorders, even in situations where battery power is the only option.

== Chart drive ==
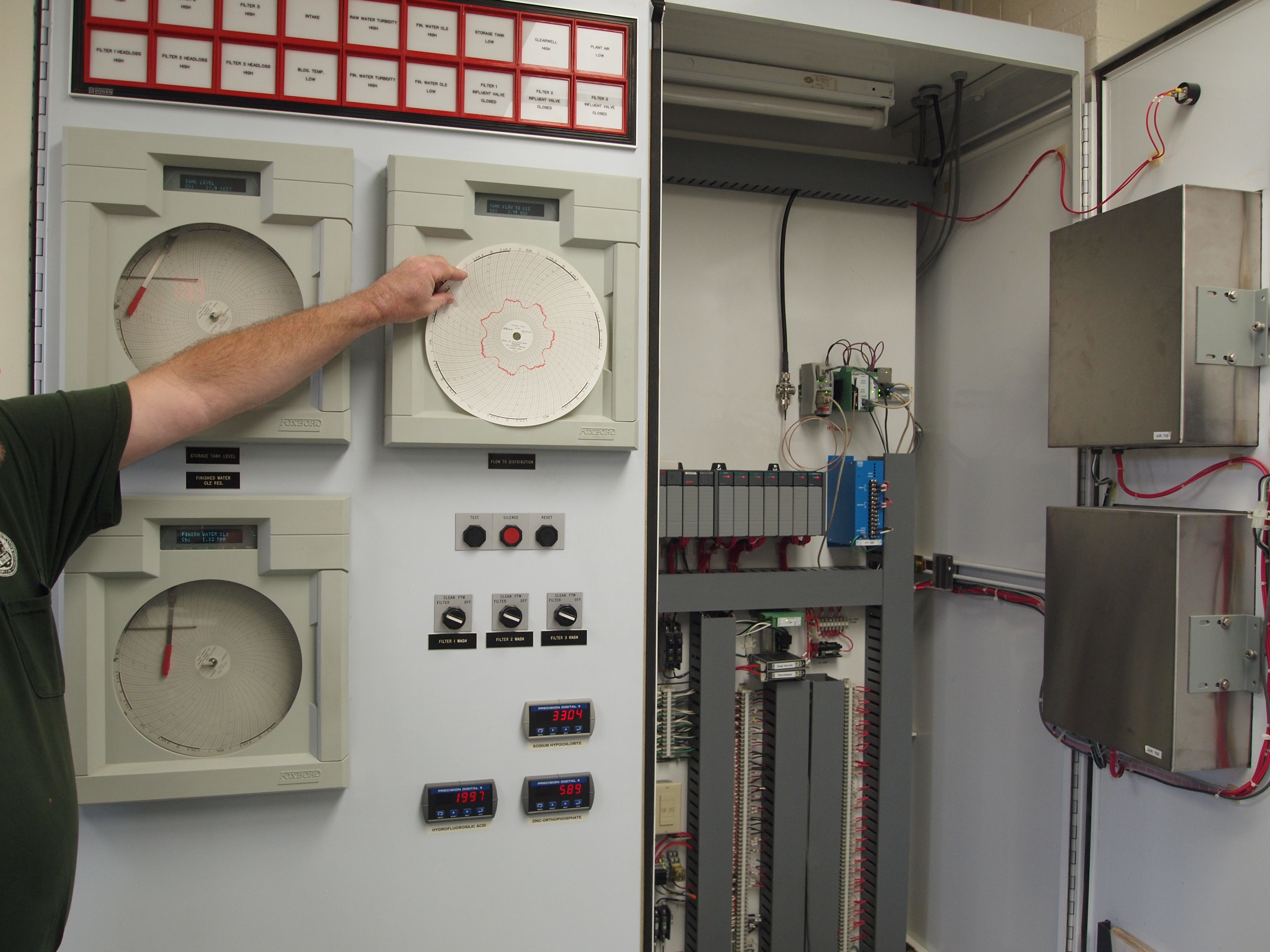
Chart recorders of a control panel at a water purification plant record water flow rates at different stages of the process.

The paper chart is driven past the pen at a steady rate by a clockwork or electrical drive mechanism. One common method is to use a miniature synchronous motor which turns at a constant speed related to the power frequency; a gear-train is used to propel the paper. Industrial strip-chart recorders may have two-speed gear trains that allow a higher speed to be used for initial adjustments of a process or to follow process upsets. Medical and scientific recorders allow a wide range of accurately-controlled speeds to be set.

An "X-Y" recorder drives the chart depending on the value of another process signal. For example, a universal testing machine may plot the tension force on a specimen against its length. Depending on the particular recorder, either the paper chart is moved or else the pen carriage has two axes of motion. Examples of an x-y recorder date back to the 18th century in the form of the steam indicator diagrams used to record pressure and volume in steam engines.

== Marking mechanisms ==
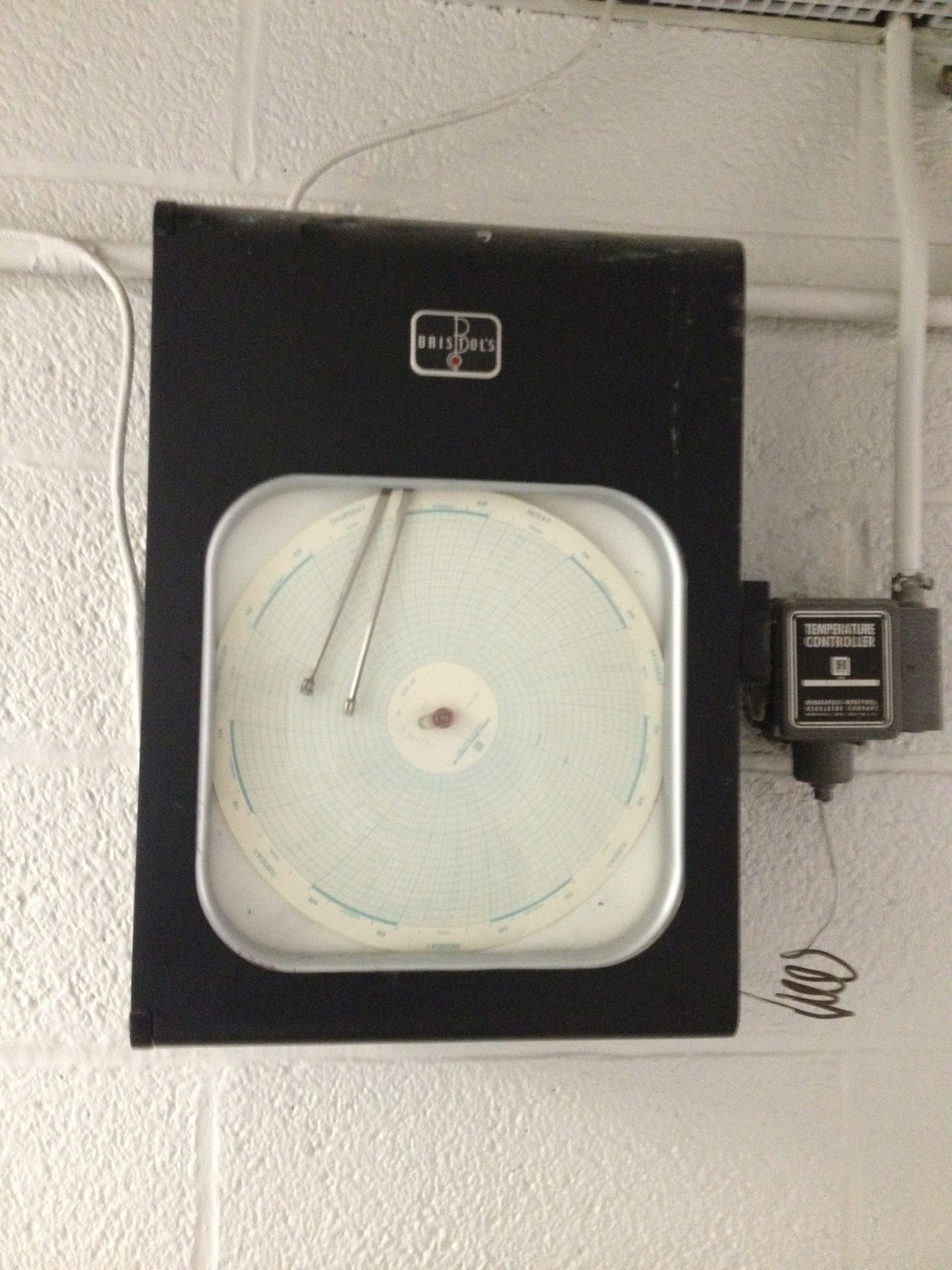
A circular chart recorder tracking temperature in a building

Many mechanisms have been adopted for marking paper. In the telegraphic siphon recorder of 1858 a fine capillary tube is connected to an ink reservoir and is deflected by the process signal. In modern strip chart recorders, a disposable cartridge combining both a fiber-tipped pen and ink reservoir has been used. Other types of recorder use a heated stylus and thermally sensitive paper, an impact printer using a ribbon and an electrically operated hammer, an electric signal acting through a stylus onto electro-sensitive paper, or an electric spark that makes a visible spot on aluminized paper. One form of sensitive and high-speed recorder used beams of ultraviolet light reflected off mirror galvanometers, directed at light-sensitive paper.

The earliest instruments derived power to move the pen directly from the sensed process signal, which limited their sensitivity and speed of response. Friction between the marking device and paper would reduce the accuracy of the measurements. Instruments with pneumatic, mechanical, or electromechanical amplifiers decoupled pen movement from process measurement, greatly increasing the sensitivity of the instrument and the flexibility of the recorder. Directly-driven pens often moved in the arc of a circle, making the scale difficult to read; pre-printed charts have curvilinear scales printed on them that compensated for the path of the marking pen.

== Galvanometer instruments ==
Many types of chart recorders use a galvanometer to drive the marking device. A light coil of wire suspended in the magnetic field of a permanent magnet deflects in proportion to the current through it; instead of the pointer and scale of a direct-reading meter, the recorder deflects a pen or other marking device. The writing mechanism may be a heated needle writing on heat-sensitive paper or a simple hollow ink-fed pen. If the pen is continuously pressed against the paper, the galvanometer must be strong enough to move the pen against the friction of the paper. To lessen the strain on the galvanometer the pen might instead only intermittently be pressed against the writing medium, to make an impression, and then move while pressure is released.

Where greater sensitivity and speed of response is required a mirror galvanometer, might be used instead, to deflected a beam of light which can be recorded photographically.

== Light beam oscillograph ==
Another type of paper chart recorder was the light beam oscillograph. It had a bandwidth of ~5 kHz full scale (approximately 100 times higher than the typical pen recorders of the day). The original models used a small mirror attached to a galvanometer to aim a high-intensity beam of light at photosensitive paper. The combination of the mirror's tiny mass combined with a chart drive that could move the paper up to 120 inches (3,000 mm) per second provided high bandwidth and impressive time axis resolution. Later models replaced the mirror with a stationary fiber-optic cathode ray tube that was in direct contact with the paper.

These recorders had several flaws. The photo-sensitive paper was very expensive, and would quickly fade when exposed to ambient light. High chart speeds meant that test durations were extremely short. These instruments were intended to capture short-duration events such as NASA rocket launches in the 1960s and a broad range of ballistic events.

== Potentiometric (servo) instruments ==
Analog chart recorders using a galvanometer movement to directly drive the pen have limited sensitivity. In a potentiometric type of recorder, the direct drive of the marking pen is replaced with a servomechanism where energy to move the pen is supplied by an amplifier. The motor-operated pen is arranged to move the sliding contact of a potentiometer to feed back the pen position to an error amplifier. The amplifier drives the motor in such a direct as to reduce the error between desired and actual pen position to zero. With a suitable signal processing amplifier, such instruments can record a wide range of process signals. However, the inertia of the servo system limits the speed of response, making these instruments most useful for signals changing over the span of a second or more.

== Digital chart recorders ==
A modern chart recorder is an embedded computer system with an analog-to-digital converter, a microcontroller, and a hard-copy printing device; such instruments allow great flexibility in signal processing, variable chart speed on process upsets, and can also communicate their measurements to remote points.

One of the first digital units was designed by William (Bill) C. McElroy Jr. working for Dohrman Instrument Company in Santa Clara, California. Up until this unit, most chart recorders were rack mounted and had one speed and one sensitivity range. McElroy's design was an instant loading paper roll 'table-top' unit using an Integrated Chopper Circuit for signal conversion. The unit had plug in circuit boards, plug in single or multi-range modules and plug in single or multi-speed modules. The recorder's sensitivity was 1 microvolt to 100 volts full-scale, which at the time was an industry first. McElroy also aided in the design and build of the Gas Chromatograph used for analysing dirt and rock samples from the 1969 Apollo 11 Moon landing.

== See also ==
- Barograph
- Electrocardiograph
- Plotter (operates in two dimensions)
- Polygraph
- Seismograph
- Thermo-hygrograph
