= Locke (given name) =

Locke is a given name occurring in various works of fiction.

In some cases, it may be based on the English surname Locke. Examples from East Asian culture may refer to the Chinese surname Luo which is sometimes romanized as Locke, because of the Cantonese pronunciation of 羅/罗 as 'Lok'.

== People with this name ==
- Locke Burt, American politician

Fictional characters

- Locke, a pseudonym of Peter Wiggin in novels by Orson Scott Card
- Locke the Echidna in the Sonic the Hedgehog comic books
- Chōjin Locke, main character of the manga Locke the Superman
- Locke Cole, important character in the SNES video game Final Fantasy VI
- Locke Lamora, protagonist of Scott Lynch's Gentleman Bastard Sequence
- Locke Vinetti, protagonist of Christopher Krovatin's book Venomous
- John Locke, an important character in the ABC show LOST.
- Locke, a character in the TV series Game of Thrones written by D.B. Weiss and David Benioff

== See also ==
- Locke (disambiguation)
