= Coning (aerodynamics) =

Helicopter phenomenon

Coning is a phenomenon which affects helicopter rotor discs, where the blades describe a cone shape as they rotate. For a helicopter on the ground, as the blades rotate, they describe a horizontal disc due to centrifugal force. However, as the helicopter generates lift, the blades are pulled upwards into a cone shape.

Coning results from the balancing of centrifugal and aerodynamic forces. The coning angle depends on RPM, gross weight and g-force. The ratio of aerodynamic forces to inertial forces is called the Lock number.

Excessive coning can occur if the RPM is allowed to drop too low or the helicopter is operated at an excessive gross weight, or under turbulent conditions or if the helicopter experiences excessive g-force. An excessively coned disc will generate less lift due to reduced disc area. If rotor RPM drops too low, the centrifugal force will reduce until is no longer sufficient to balance the lift, and the rotor blades fold up with no chance of recovery.

Coning is not to be confused with bending stresses within the blade. These are caused by tips of the helicopter rotor blades moving faster through the air than the parts of the blades near the hub, generating more lift. Helicopter rotor blades may be designed with washout (twist) so that lift is relatively uniform along the blades. However, the two phenomena are related. Some helicopters such as the Bell UH-1 Iroquois are designed with "pre-coned" blades, which are curved downwards but lay more flat in flight.

== See also ==
- Unequal rotor lift distribution
