= Wing twist =

Aircraft wing feature

Wing twist is an aerodynamic feature added to aircraft wings to adjust lift distribution along the wing.

Often, the purpose of lift redistribution is to ensure that the wing tip is the last part of the wing surface to stall, for example when executing a roll or steep climb; it involves twisting the wingtip a small amount downwards in relation to the rest of the wing. This ensures that the effective angle of attack is always lower at the wingtip than at the root, meaning the root will stall before the tip. This is desirable because the aircraft's flight control surfaces are often located at the wingtip, and the variable stall characteristics of a twisted wing alert the pilot to the advancing stall while still allowing the control surfaces to remain effective, meaning the pilot can usually prevent the aircraft from stalling fully before control is completely lost.

== Types ==
Wing twist can be classified into two types according to how the local angle of incidence varies from the wing root to the wingtip:

Arzeos Z01 aircraft, in which wing twist can be seen

Wing twist

Washout (negative geometric twist): The angle of incidence decreases from the root to the tip. This configuration is commonly used to reduce lift towards the wingtips and promote root-first stalling, helping the ailerons remain effective as the wing approaches a stall.

Wash-in (positive geometric twist): The angle of incidence increases from the root to the tip. This configuration is less common and may be used to achieve specific aerodynamic characteristics. One example is the Grumman X-29, which featured pronounced wash-in in association with its forward-swept wings.

Wing twist can also, rarely, refer to the deflection of the wing when it is made of insufficiently stiff materials; actuation of the flaps can, instead of deflecting air as intended, cause the wing itself to be deflected and is related to compressibility effects; this problem has mostly been eradicated however, with modern high-strength alloys and composites.

Wing twist is also observed in insects.

== See also ==
- Adaptive Compliant Wing
- Angle of incidence
- Sail twist
- Unequal rotor lift distribution
- Washout (aeronautics)
