= Bad Gandersheim =

- Town
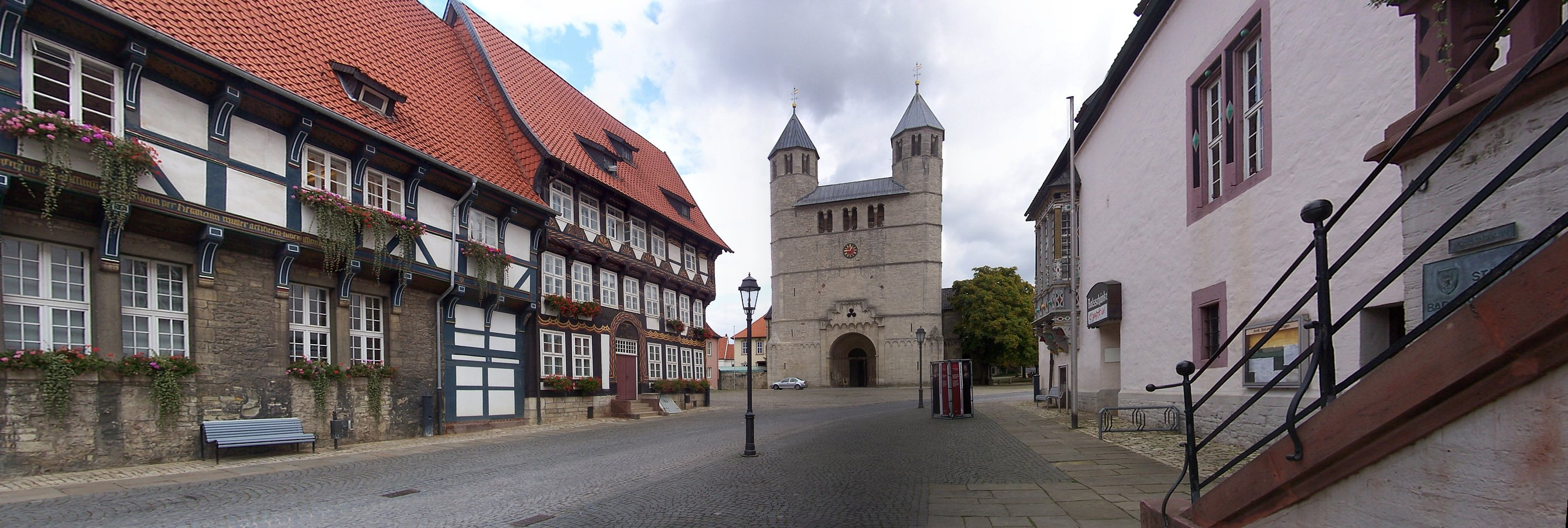

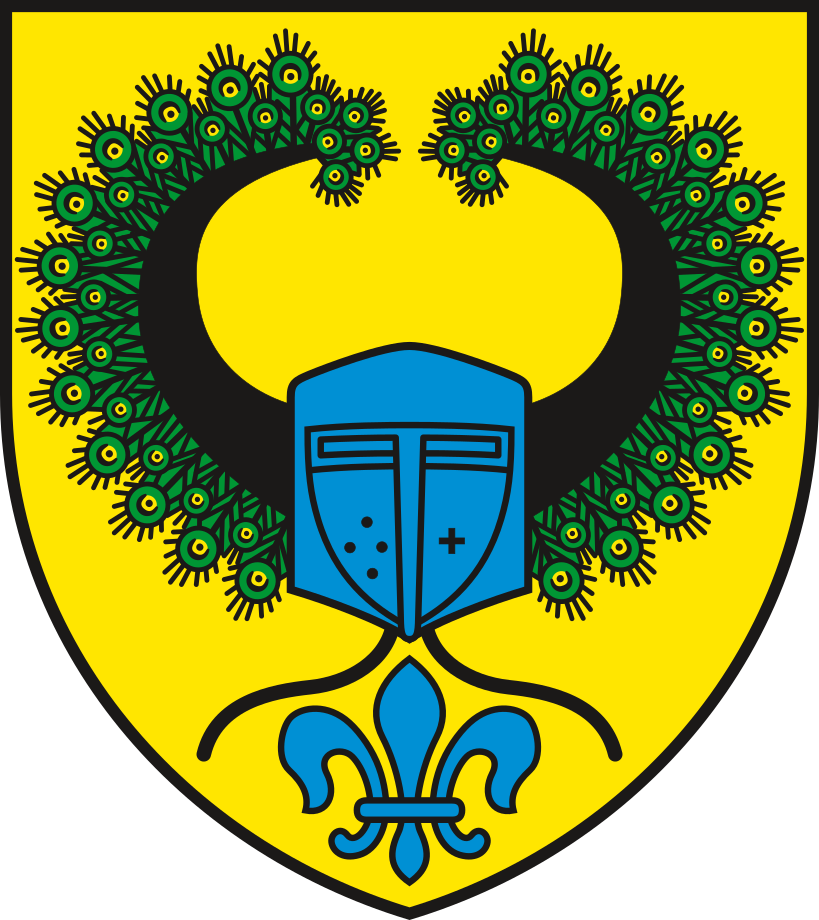
- Coat of arms

- Location of Bad Gandersheim within Northeim district
- Interactive map of Bad Gandersheim
- Location within Germany Location within Lower Saxony
- Coordinates: 51°52′19″N 10°1′31″E
- Country: Germany
- State: Lower Saxony
- District: Northeim

Government
  - Mayor (2021–26): Franziska Schwarz (SPD)

Area
  - Total: 90.85 km^{2} (35.08 sq mi)
- Elevation: 143 m (469 ft)

Population (2025-12-31)
  - Total: 8,876
  - Density: 97.70/km^{2} (253.0/sq mi)
- Time zone: UTC+01:00 (CET)
  - Summer (DST): UTC+02:00 (CEST)
- Postal codes: 37575–37581
- Dialling codes: 05382
- Vehicle registration: NOM, EIN, GAN
- Website: www.bad-gandersheim.de

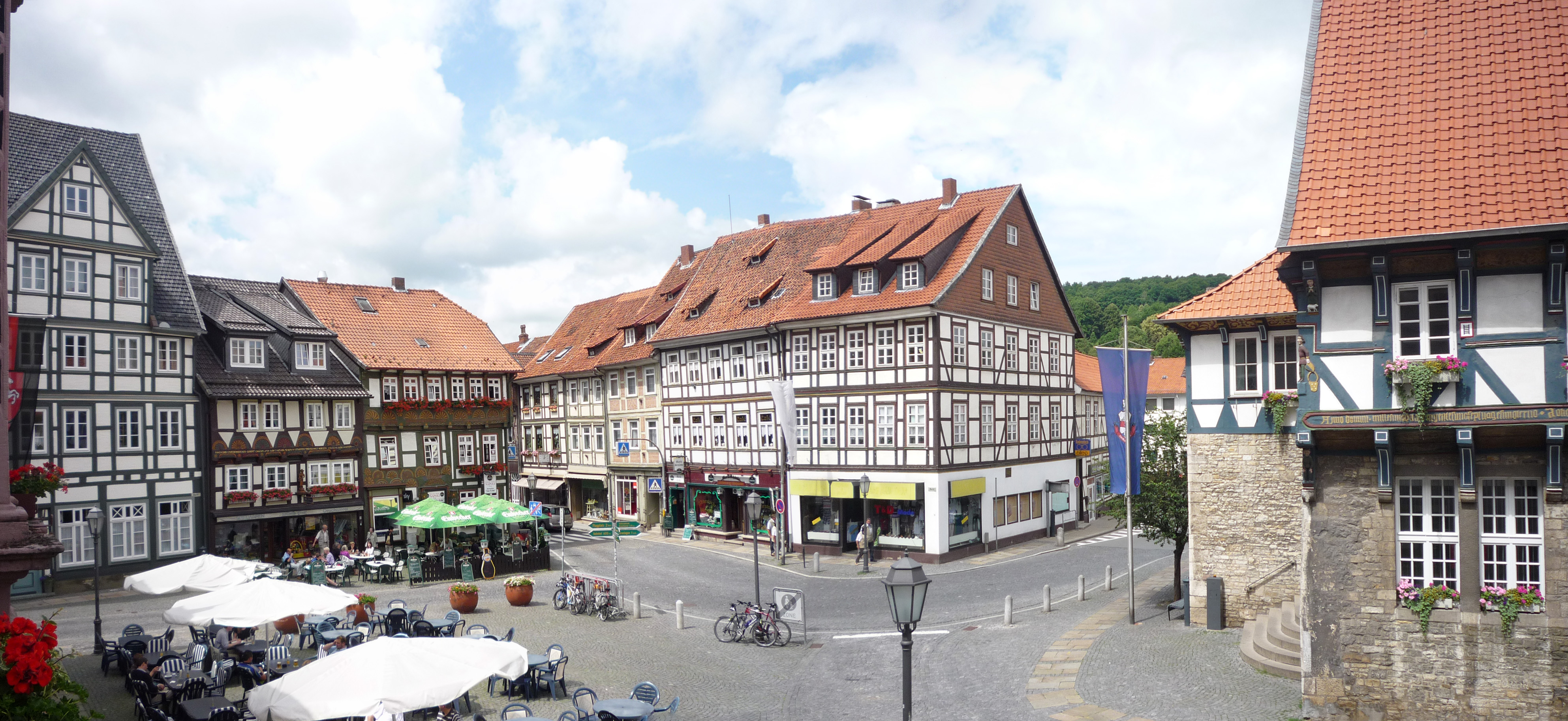
Marketplace. Left: Weißes Roß Hotel, centre: Zur Ecke, right: Bracken

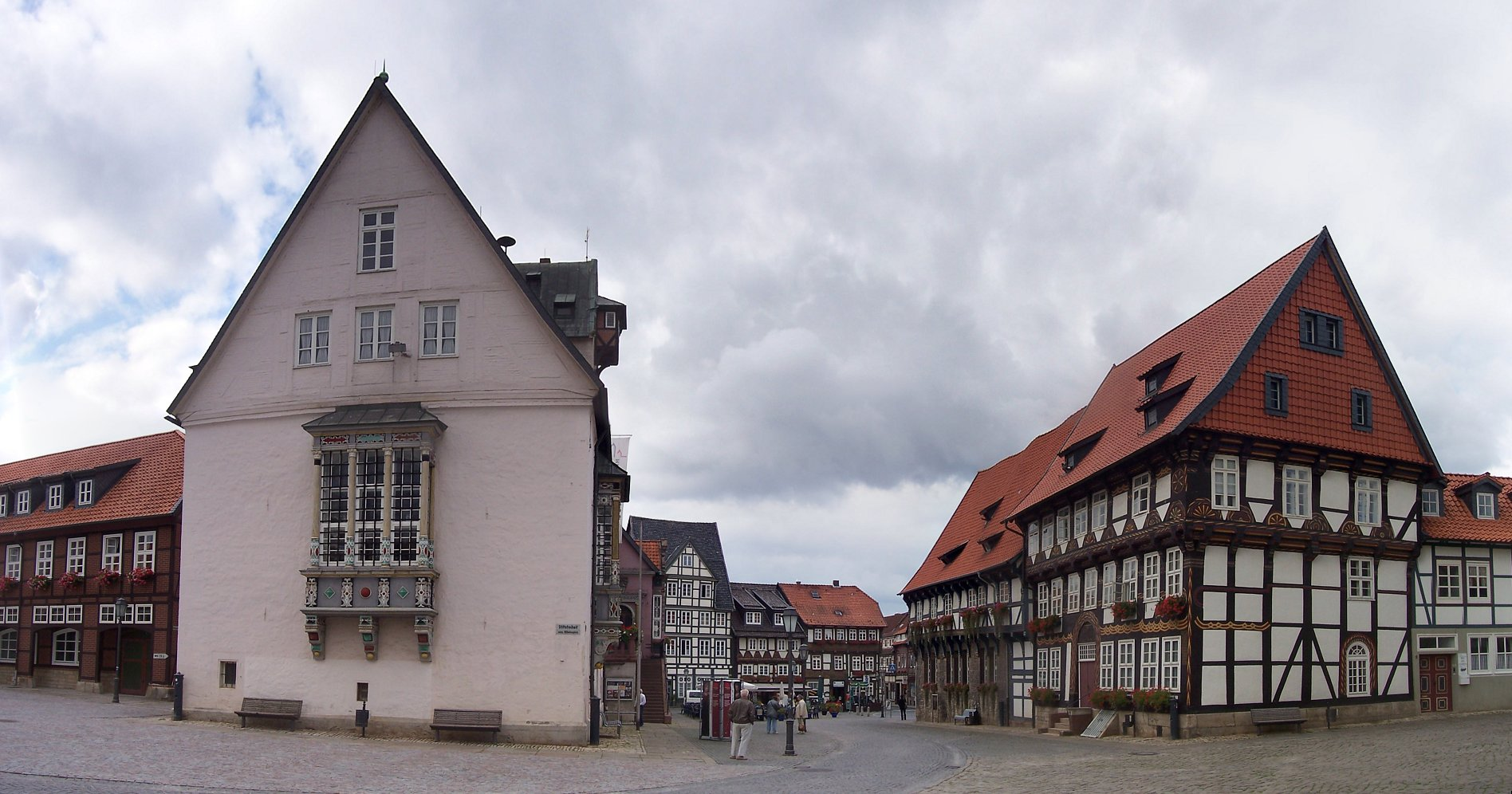
Marketplace

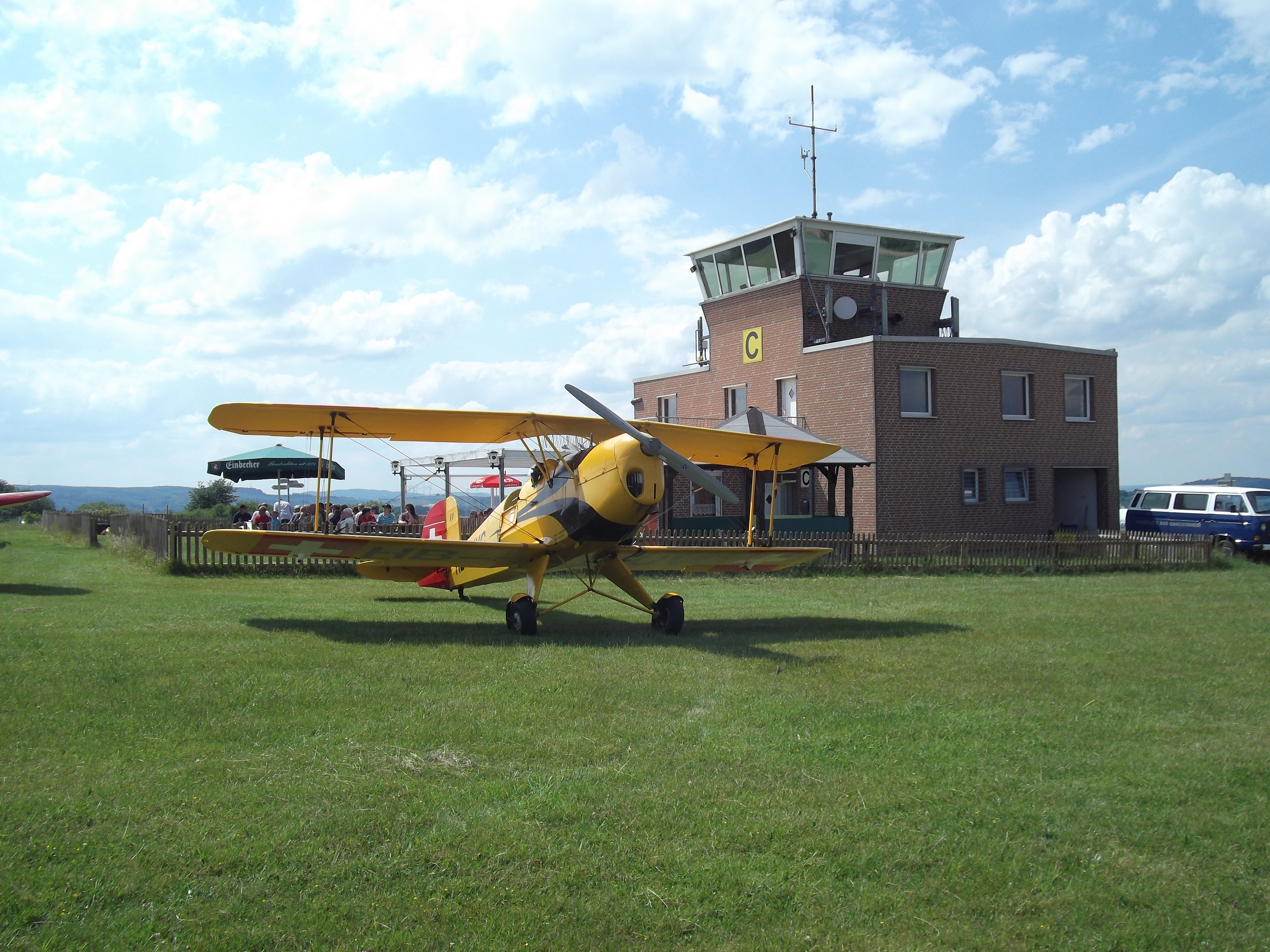
Airfield

Bad Gandersheim (German pronunciation: [baːt ˈɡandɐshaɪm]; Eastphalian: Ganderssen) is a town in southern Lower Saxony, Germany, located in the district of Northeim. As of December 2020, it had a population of 9,492.

Bad Gandersheim has many half-timbered houses and is located on the German Timber-Frame Road (German: Deutsche Fachwerkstraße). The town contains an airport as well.

== Geography ==
The town of Bad Gandersheim lies between the Leine Uplands, Weser Uplands, and Harz Foreland in the valley of the Gande River, into which its tributary, the Eterna, empties within the town's territory. To the north lies the Heber Ridge. The borough is predominantly hilly. The Harz Mountains begin about 10 kilometres (6.2 miles) east of the town, and 5 kilometres (3.1 miles) to the west is the Leine Graben (German: Leinegraben).

=== Borough divisions ===
The borough of Bad Gandersheim consists of the following subdivisions based on the surrounding villages:

- Ackenhausen
- Altgandersheim
- Clus
- Dankelsheim
- Dannhausen
- Ellierode
- Gehrenrode
- Gremsheim
- Hachenhausen
- Harriehausen
- Heckenbeck
- Helmscherode
- Seboldshausen
- Wolperode
- Wrescherode

== History ==
The town dates back to 852, when Gandersheim Abbey, a house of secular canonesses, was created in nearby Brunshausen by Liudolf, Duke of Saxony and his wife Oda. The first abbey church (German: Stiftskirche) in the town proper was begun in 856. In 990 the abbey received the market and tax rights. During the 10th century, Gandersheim was one of the most important towns of Saxony; the first German poet Hrosvit (Roswitha) lived and worked here until 973. In 1159 Gandersheim was first mentioned as a town.

When a mineral spring was discovered in 1240, Pope Gregory IX initiated the erection of the Holy Spirit hospital. Around 1330, the Dukes of Brunswick built a castle as a secular counterbalance to the abbey church. This building serves today as the magistrates' court and youth correctional facility.

In the late 19th century, the town began to become known for the curative powers of its mineral springs, and in 1932 Gandersheim received the official right to call itself a spa town, thus Bad Gandersheim, on account of these springs.

In the summer of 1926 there was a three-day "Roswitha Memorial Celebration in 1000-year old Gandersheim". This was the first time the medieval author was used as a symbolic figure for the town. Similar celebrations took place in 1930 and 1933; these had clear national-socialist themes: "German Culture" versus "Jewish-Communist Decadence."

During World War 2, from October 1944 to April 1945, the town was the site of a subcamp of the Buchenwald Concentration Camp that produced aircraft parts.

In 1952, the town celebrated the 1100-year jubilee of the founding of the monastery by Liudolf. A history play, The Song of Gandersheim, was presented in the market square. This was the unofficial prelude to the summer festival Gandersheimer Domfestspiele, which has been presented yearly on the plaza in front of the abbey church since 1959. Since this time, it has established itself as Lower Saxony's largest professional summer theatre festival. In 2006, its four major productions were attended by approximately 55,000 theatre visitors.

In 2004, Klaus Weineck established Weineck Engineering, which produced the Weineck Cobra from 2006-2011. The engineering firm, produced 15 cars before going bankrupt do to lack of orders for the car.

== Mayors ==
- 1968–1970: Hans-Dieter Gottschalk (1932–2005)
- 1974–1986: Heinz Köhler (1919–2010)
- 1986–1991: Uwe Schwarz (SPD)
- 1991–1996: Rudolf Hermes (CDU)
- 1996–2001: Uwe Schwarz (SPD)
- 2001–2014: Heinz-Gerhard Ehmen (independent)
- 2014-incumbent: Franziska Schwarz (SPD)

== Twin towns ==
Bad Gandersheim is twinned with:

- Rotselaar, Belgium
- Skegness, United Kingdom

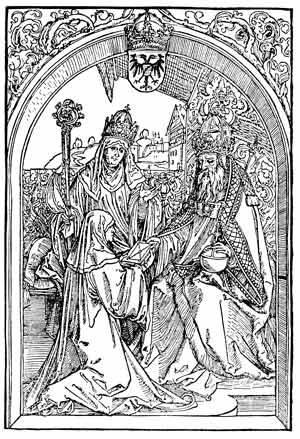
Hrotsvitha, 1501

== Notable residents ==
- Hrotsvitha (c. 935–973), secular canoness who wrote drama and Christian poetry
- Wilhelm Keitel (1882–1946), field marshal of Nazi Germany, executed for war crimes
- Bodewin Keitel (1888–1953), general, brother of Wilhelm Keitel
- Herbert Otto Gille (1897–1966), general of the Waffen-SS
- Wolfgang Liebe (1911–2005), aircraft engineer, aerodynamics, inventor of the wing fence
- Wolfgang Schöne (born 1940), bass-baritone in opera and concert.
- Mehrdad Mostofizadeh (born 1969), politician
