= Gog Magog Golf Course =

Golf course and protected area in Cambridgeshire, England

Coordinates: 52.165°N 0.174°E

- Site of Special Scientific Interest
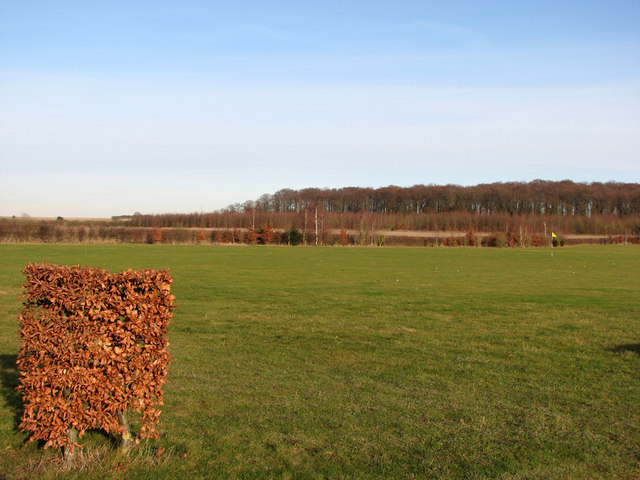
- Location of Gog Magog Golf Course.
- Area of search: Cambridgeshire
- Grid reference: TL 489 541
- Interest: Biological
- Area: 88.4 hectares
- Notification date: 1985
- Location map: Magic Map

Gog Magog Golf Course is an 88.4-hectare (218-acre) biological Site of Special Scientific Interest on Gog Magog Golf Club south-east of Cambridge in Cambridgeshire.

The course is calcareous grassland which has a rich variety of flora. The main grasses are upright brome, red fescue and false oat-grass, and there are herbs such as the nationally rare moon carrot and the locally rare perennial flax.

The site is private land with no public access.
