= Weineck Cobra Limited Edition =

Weineck Cobra 780
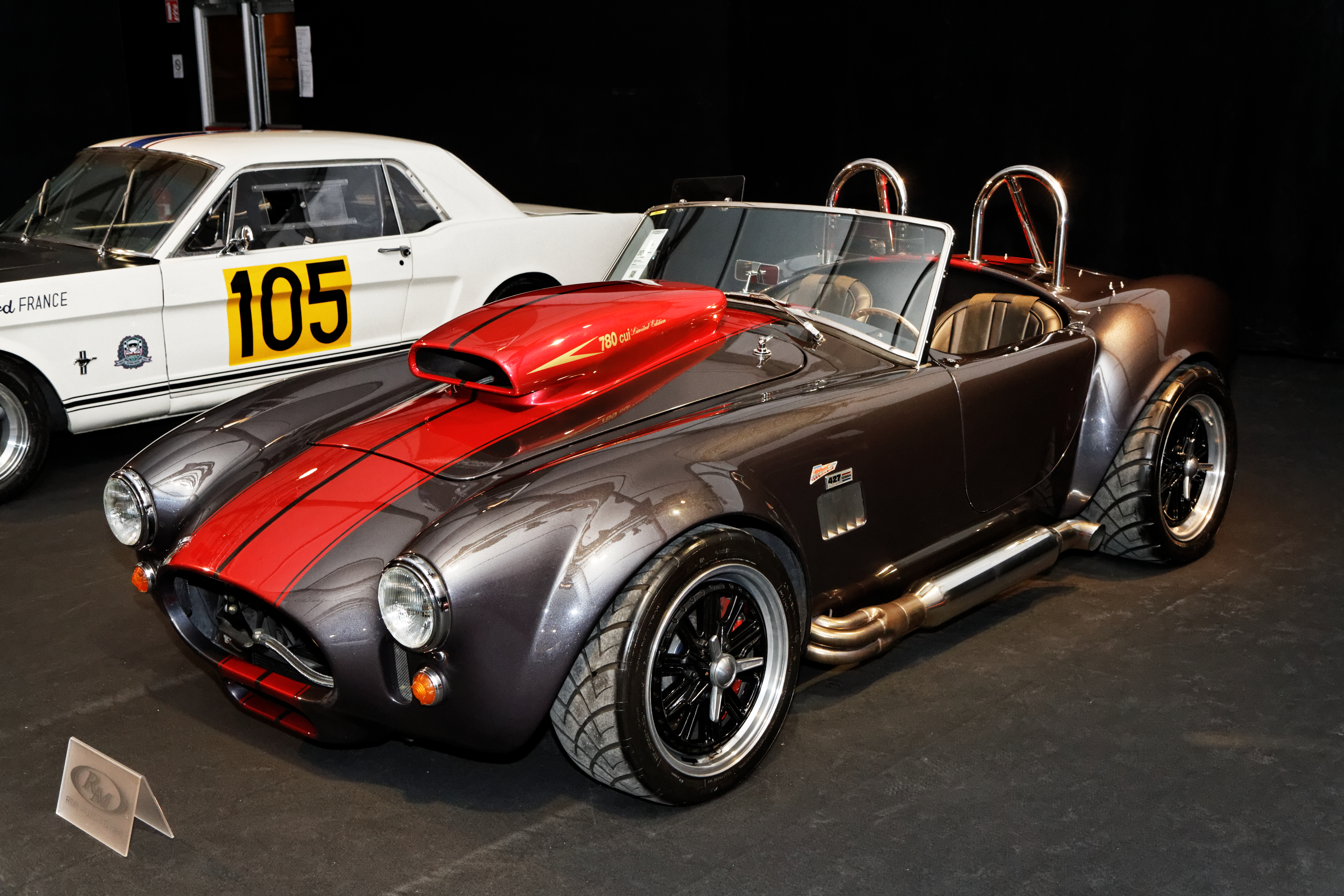
- Chassis no. 7 being sold at the 2014 Paris RM Sotheby's Auction

Overview
- Manufacturer: Weineck
- Model code: 780cui
- Production: 2006-2011 (15 made)
- Model years: 2008-2012
- Assembly: Bad Gandersheim
- Designer: Klaus Weineck

Body and chassis
- Body style: Roadster
- Layout: FR Layout
- Related: AC Cobra

Powertrain
- Engine: 12,792 cubic centimetres (780.6 cu in; 12.792 L) V8
- Power output: 1,184 brake horsepower (1,200 PS; 883 kW) @ 7,000 rpm 1,760 newton-metres (1,300 lbf⋅ft) @ 5,600 rpm
- Transmission: 4-speed manual

Dimensions
- Wheelbase: 2,286 millimetres (90.0 in)
- Length: 4,200 millimetres (170 in)
- Width: 1,745 millimetres (68.7 in)
- Height: 1,170 millimetres (46 in)
- Curb weight: 989 kilograms (2,180 lb)

The Weineck Cobra Limited Edition is a sports car built by Weineck Engineering, a German car manufacturer. Weineck Cobra's body is a modified Shelby Cobra replica body.

The engine used in Weineck, is a proprietary Weineck V8, though its parts were manufactured by Donovan Engineering. It used an entirely unique tube chassis, because the original Shelby chassis could not hold up to the torque of the motor. The engine cooling system had to be designed in house because chassis no. 4 was ordered by a customer in Dubai.

== Performance ==
In 2007, Weineck published a video of the 780 racing a quarter mile on road legal tires but on a prepped drag strip. The acceleration data was:

0 - 100 kph	2.3 s
0 - 200 kph	4.9 s
0 - 300 kph	10.0 s
100 - 200 kph	2.6 s
200 - 300 kph	5.1 s
0 - 60 mph	2.2 s
1/8 mile	6.0 s at 142.3 mph
1/4 mile	8.8 s at 177.7 mph
max acceleration	1.25 g (12 m/s²)

== Price ==
It was announced that Weineck Cobra Limited Edition's price would be €545,000 in Germany. Only 15 were produced, with 2 prototypes, 1 780 cu in (12.8 L) and 1 976 cu in (15.99 L). Chassis no. 7 was sold at auction in 2014 in Paris by RM Sotheby's.

Weineck Cobra 976 Prototype

Overview
- Manufacturer: Weineck
- Model code: 976cui
- Production: 2012 (1 made, converted back to 780)
- Assembly: Bad Gandersheim
- Designer: Klaus Weineck

Body and chassis
- Body style: Roadster
- Layout: FR Layout
- Related: AC Cobra

Powertrain
- Engine: 15,994 cubic centimetres (976.0 cu in; 15.994 L) V8
- Power output: 1,800.8 brake horsepower (1,825.8 PS; 1,342.9 kW) @ 9,000 rpm 1,990.0 newton-metres (1,467.7 lbf⋅ft) @ 6,900 rpm
- Transmission: 6-speed manual

Dimensions
- Wheelbase: 2,286 millimetres (90.0 in)
- Length: 4,200 millimetres (170 in)
- Width: 1,745 millimetres (68.7 in)
- Height: 1,170 millimetres (46 in)
- Curb weight: 1,166 kilograms (2,571 lb)
