= Bad Gandersheim Aerodrome =

Aerodrome in Northeim, Germany

Bad Gandersheim Airport Flugplatz Bad Gandersheim
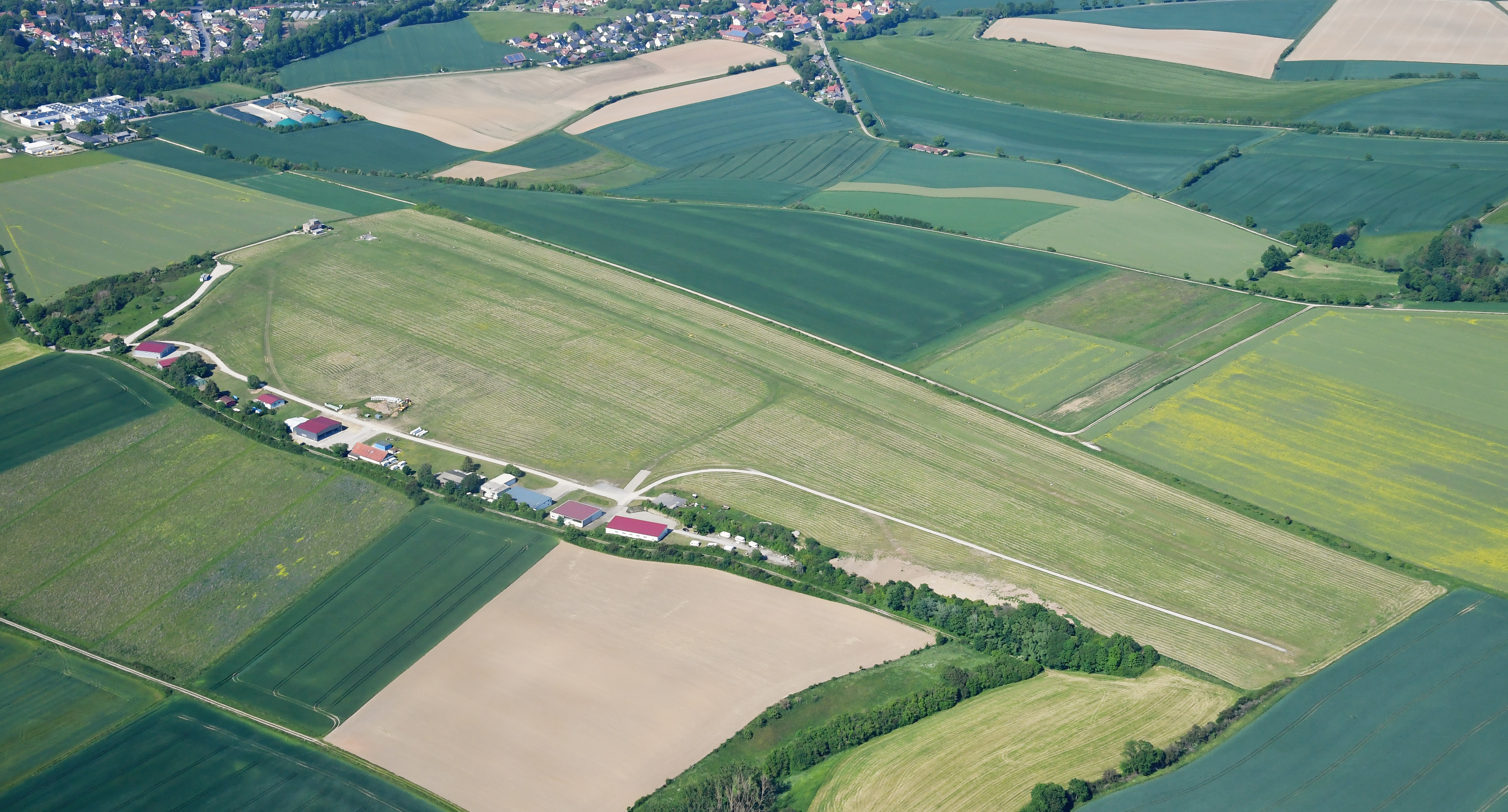
- IATA: none; ICAO: EDVA

Summary
- Airport type: Public
- Operator: Flugplatz Bad Gandersheim e.V.
- Serves: Bad Gandersheim, Germany
- Elevation AMSL: 791 ft (241 m)
- Coordinates: 51°51′15″N 010°01′40″E
- Website: www.flugplatz-bad-gandersheim.de

Map
- Location within Germany

Runways
Direction	Length		Surface
Direction	ft	m	Surface
17/35	2.379	725	grass

Bad Gandersheim Airport (German: Flugplatz Bad Gandersheim) is an aerodrome located in Bad Gandersheim in the district of Northeim in Lower Saxony, Germany.

== See also ==
- Transport in Germany
- List of airports in Germany
