= Wolfgang Liebe =

German aeronautical engineer (1911–2005)

- Born: 22 June 1911; Bad Gandersheim, Germany
- Died: 21 October 2005 (aged 94); Berlin, Germany
- Education: University of Danzig
- Occupation: Aerospace engineer
- Known for: Aerodynamics research
- Honours: Medal of Honour from the Wessex Institute of Technology

Wolfgang Liebe (22 June 1911 in Bad Gandersheim, Germany – 21 October 2005 in Berlin, Germany) was a German aerospace engineer and pioneer in aerodynamics, specialising in research to avoid stall in airfoils. He introduced the concept of wing fences. They obstruct span-wise airflow along the wing, and are widely used specifically in early swept-wing designs.

== Biography ==
Raised in Cottbus, Germany, Liebe attended the University of Danzig, receiving his degree in aircraft engineering in 1936. Very early on he had decided to become an aircraft engineer, having been an intern at the Junkers aircraft factory in Dessau. After university he joined the Deutsche Versuchsanstalt für Luftfahrt (DVL, German Research Institute for Aviation) and concentrated on the problem of preventing stall. DVL was one of the foremost aircraft research facilities in Germany at the time. To this end he tried out various devices to increase safety on a Bf 109. These trials led to a patent being granted in 1938: “Device to avoid the spread of flow disturbances”.

Starting in 1941 he was working at the aeronautics research institute in Prague-Letňany. After the war he was taken prisoner there and put into a train eastbound. Somehow he ended up in Belgrade, Yugoslavia and put in charge of the development of a high performance glider aircraft. In 1951 he was allowed to come back to Germany and got his Ph.D. in aircraft engineering from the University of Hannover. The thesis had the title “Reasons and Rules for Stall in Aircraft”.

In 1955 he was appointed Professor at Technische Universität Berlin for “Aerodynamics of Airfoils” and retired in 1976. After retirement he continued research and received the Medal of Honour from the Wessex Institute of Technology in 2004 for "outstanding contributions to aerodynamic science and technology“.
