= Gog Magog Golf Club =

Golf club in Cambridgeshire, England

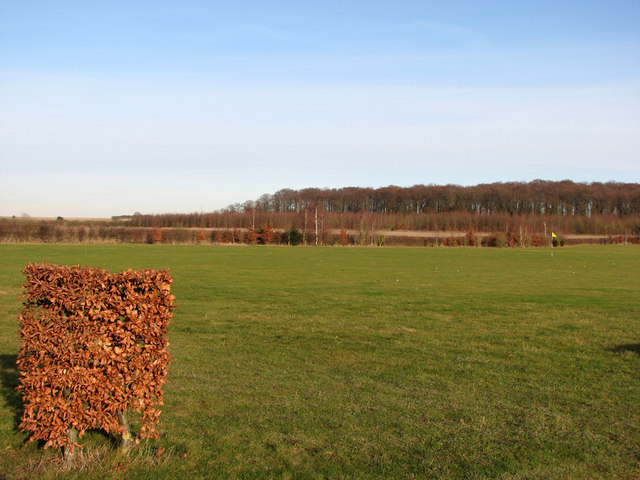

- Location within Cambridgeshire
- 52°9′54″N 0°10′50″E

Club information
- Location: Shelford Bottom, Cambridgeshire, England
- Established: October 1901
- Tota holes: 36

Gog Magog Golf Club is a golf club, located in Shelford Bottom, Cambridgeshire, England. It is located about 4 miles south of Cambridge.

== History ==
The Club was established in October 1901, founded by John Bascombe Lock. The course was designed by W. Duncan. Herbert Strong, the professional from Sandwich, would start his golf career here in 1902. The Wright Cup was held at the Gog Magog Golf Club in the early 1970s. Howard Florey was a player here while at Cambridge. The golf course was historically "reserved for graduate members of the University of Cambridge".

== Wandlebury course ==
A second course was established in 1999, the Wandlebury, which is also voted the second best golf course in the county after the old course. In 2007, the Wandlebury course was used for the regional qualifiers to the Open Championship. On the hill above the course is an Iron Age plateau fort.

== Tournaments hosted ==
The Gog Magog Club is also well known for holding the annual Lagonda Trophy, which has been won by many big golfing names such as Luke Donald and Lee Westwood.

== Site of Special Scientific Interest ==
Gog Magog Golf Course is a biological Site of Special Scientific Interest.
