= Thermo-hygrograph =

Device which records temperature and humidity

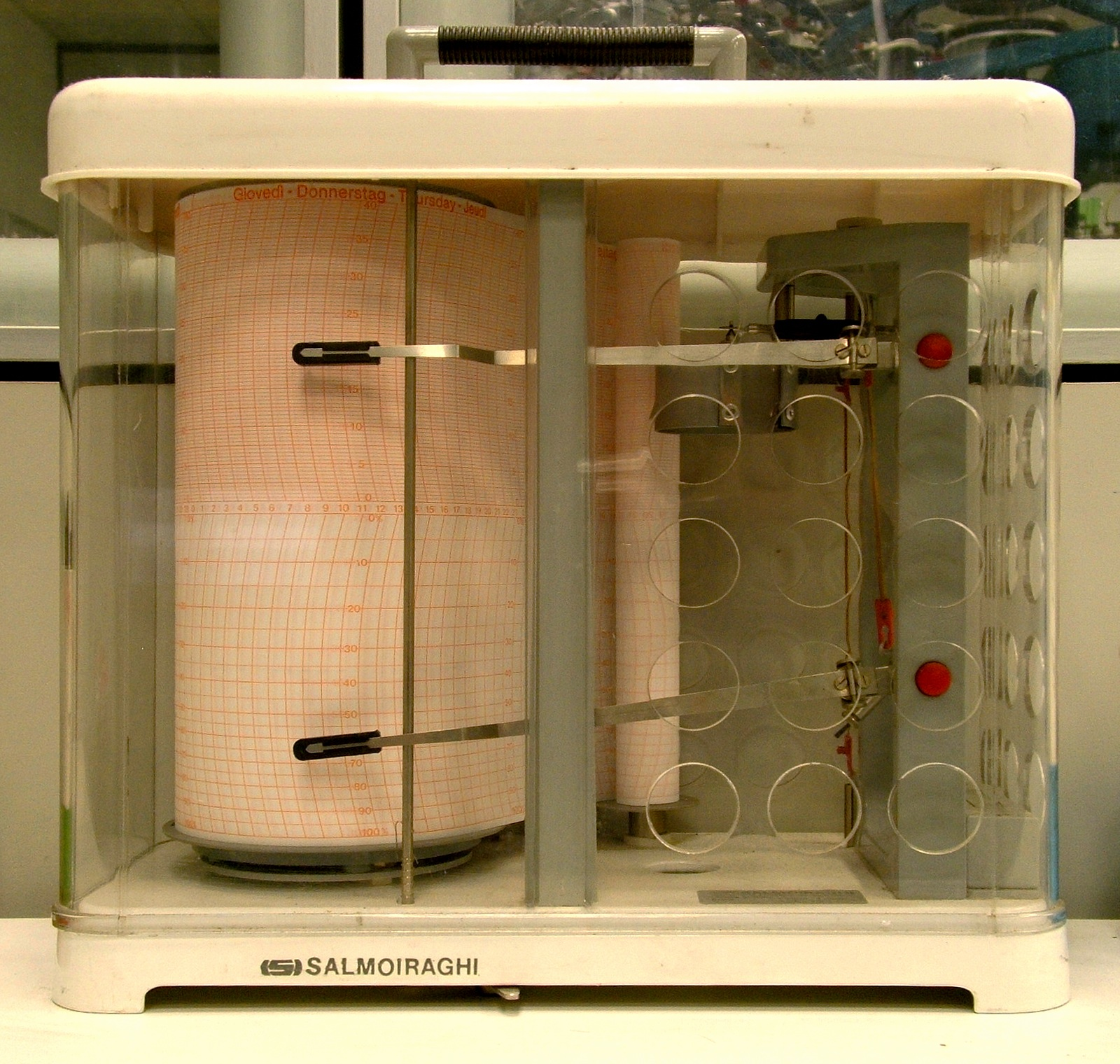
A thermo-hygrograph

A thermo-hygrograph or hygrothermograph is a chart recorder that measures and records both temperature and humidity (or dew point). Similar devices that record only one parameter are a thermograph for temperature and hygrograph for humidity.

Thermographs where the variations are recorded using photography were described by several scientists as early as 1845, including Francis Ronalds who was Honorary Director of the Kew Observatory. An updated model of the initial machine was deployed across the national observational network set up by the new UK Met Office in 1867 and coordinated by Kew Observatory. These instruments then saw extended use around the world.

An alternative thermograph configuration has a pen that records temperature on a revolving cylinder. The pen is at the end of a lever that is controlled by a bi-metal strip of temperature-sensitive metal which bends as the temperature changes. A human hair bundle can be used for humidity in such machines.
