= Bella Sidney Woolf =

English writer (1877–1960)

Bella Sidney Woolf OBE
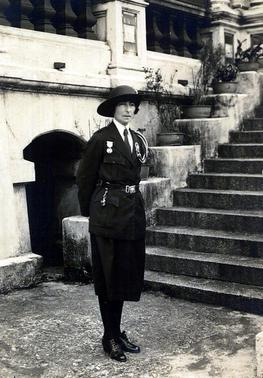
- Born: 1877; London, England
- Died: 1960 (aged 82–83); Oxford, England
- Spouses: Robert Heath Lock (m. 1910; died 1915); Tom Southorn (m. 1921; died 1957)
- Relatives: Leonard Woolf (brother)

Bella Sidney Woolf OBE (1877–1960) was an English author. Her writings predominantly draw on her experience living overseas in British colonies. Through her brother Leonard Woolf, she is the sister-in-law of author Virginia Woolf.

== Early life ==
Woolf was born in London, the eldest (or 2nd eldest) of ten children to Marie (née de Jongh) and the Jewish barrister Solomon Rees Sydney Woolf. Her father died in 1892.

At the end of 1907, she travelled to Ceylon (today known as Sri Lanka) to visit her brother, Leonard Woolf, then a junior civil servant stationed in Kandy.

== First marriage ==
In the following months she met Robert Heath Lock, Assistant Director of the Peradeniya Botanical Gardens. They were married in 1910. In August 1908, she returned to England with her brother, who was returning briefly before taking up a promotion as Assistant Government Agent of Hambantota. Lock died in 1915.

== Second marriage ==
In 1921, Woolf married Tom Southorn, whom she met in Ceylon. Following his service in Ceylon, Southorn served as the colonial secretary of British Hong Kong, Acting Administrator of Hong Kong, and Governor of Gambia.

After her marriage, Woolf sometimes went by Bella Woolf Southorn, and occasionally Bella Sidney Southorn, but continued to publish as Bella Sidney Woolf.

From 1926 to 1936, Woolf acted as commissioner of the Girl Guides in Hong Kong. In 1935 she was appointed an OBE.

== Writing ==
Woolf wrote fiction and non-fiction. In both she drew on her experiences in British colonies. She also authored and co-authored writings on current events and science.

How To See Ceylon by Woolf was published in 1914 and is considered the first pocket guidebook of the island. The book incorporates her experience of car journeys "along the sunny roads of Ceylon." Three more editions followed in 1922, 1924 and 1929.

Regarding Ceylon, Woolf said that "it is unfortunate that so many natives are adopting English dress, blind to the fact that it destroys all their individuality and Oriental grace."

Published in 1914, Woolf's propagandist work Right Against Might: The Great War of 1914 documents the first year of World War I in support of British Forces and the League of the Empire.

Much of Woolf's fictional writing was short stories drawn from her life in the colonies and her marriage to Lock and Southorn, both colonial civil servants.

Woolf also wrote several children's books, all drawing on her various overseas experiences; The Twins in Ceylon and its sequels were very popular.

== Works ==
- Jerry & Joe, A Tale of Two Jubilees (Oliphant, Anderson & Ferrier, Edinburgh, 1897)
- All in a Castle Fair (Cassell, New York, 1900)
- Dear Sweet Anne or The Mysterious Veres (Collins, probably 1900–1910)
- Little Miss Prue (Cassell, London, 1907)
- Golden House (Duckworth and Co., c1910)^
- The Twins in Ceylon (Duckworth and Co., London, 1909, 1913) and sequels
- How To See Ceylon (1st Ed: Visidunu Prakashakayo, 1914; 2nd Ed: Times of Ceylon Co, 1922; 4th Ed: Times of Ceylon Co, 1929) (ISBN 9559170511)
- Right against might; the great war of 1914 (Cambridge, W. Heffer, 1914) (Reprinted: Pranava Books, 2009)
- Eastern Star-Dust (Times of Ceylon, Colombo, 1922)
- The Strange Little Girl (Thomas Nelson and Sons, London c1923)^
- Chips of China (Kelly and Walsh Ltd, Shanghai, 1930)
- From Groves of Palm (W. Heffer & Sons Ltd, Cambridge, 1925)^^
- Bits of Old China and Under the Mosquito Curtain

^ sometimes credited to 'Woolf, Bella Sidney (Mrs. R. H. Lock)'
^^ credited to 'Woolf, Bella Sidney (Mrs. W. T. Southorn)'

=== Co-authored ===
- Recent Progress in the Study of Variation, Heredity, and Evolution, (Robert Heath Lock, Leonard Doncaster, Bella Sidney Woolf) (Pranava Books, 1916. Reprinted Pranava Books, 2009)
- Little Folks – The Magazine for Boys and Girls Volume 84 [1916], Geoffrey H. White. Eveline M. Williams. D. H. Parry. Nancy M. Hayes. Walter Copeland. Bella Sidney Woolf. Squirrel. et al. (Cassell and Co. Ltd, London, 1916)
