= Mehrdad Mostofizadeh =

German politician (born 1969)

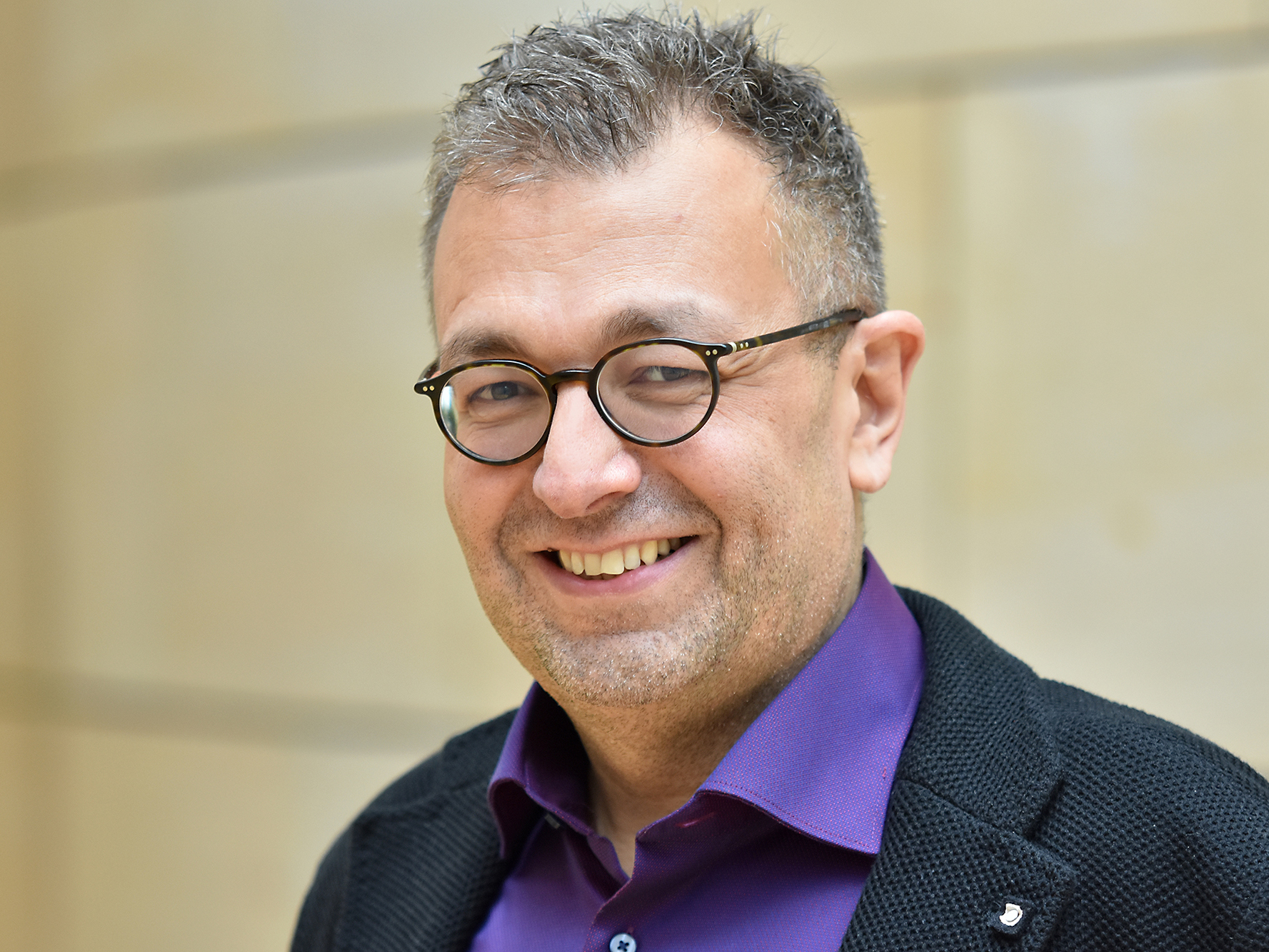
- Mostofizadeh in 2019

Member of the Landtag of North Rhine-Westphalia
- Incumbent
- Assumed office 9 June 2010

Personal details
- Born: 30 April 1969 (age 56) Bad Gandersheim
- Party: Alliance 90/The Greens (since 1988)

Mehrdad Mostofizadeh (born 30 April 1969 in Bad Gandersheim) is a German politician serving as a member of the Landtag of North Rhine-Westphalia since 2010. From 2015 to 2017, he served as group leader of Alliance 90/The Greens.
