= Kevin Locke =

Kevin Locke may refer to:

- Kevin Locke (musician) (1954–2022), Native American musician
- Kevin Locke (rugby league) (born 1989), New Zealand rugby league footballer

== See also ==
- Kevin Lock (born 1953), English former footballer
- Locke (surname)
