= Sail twist =

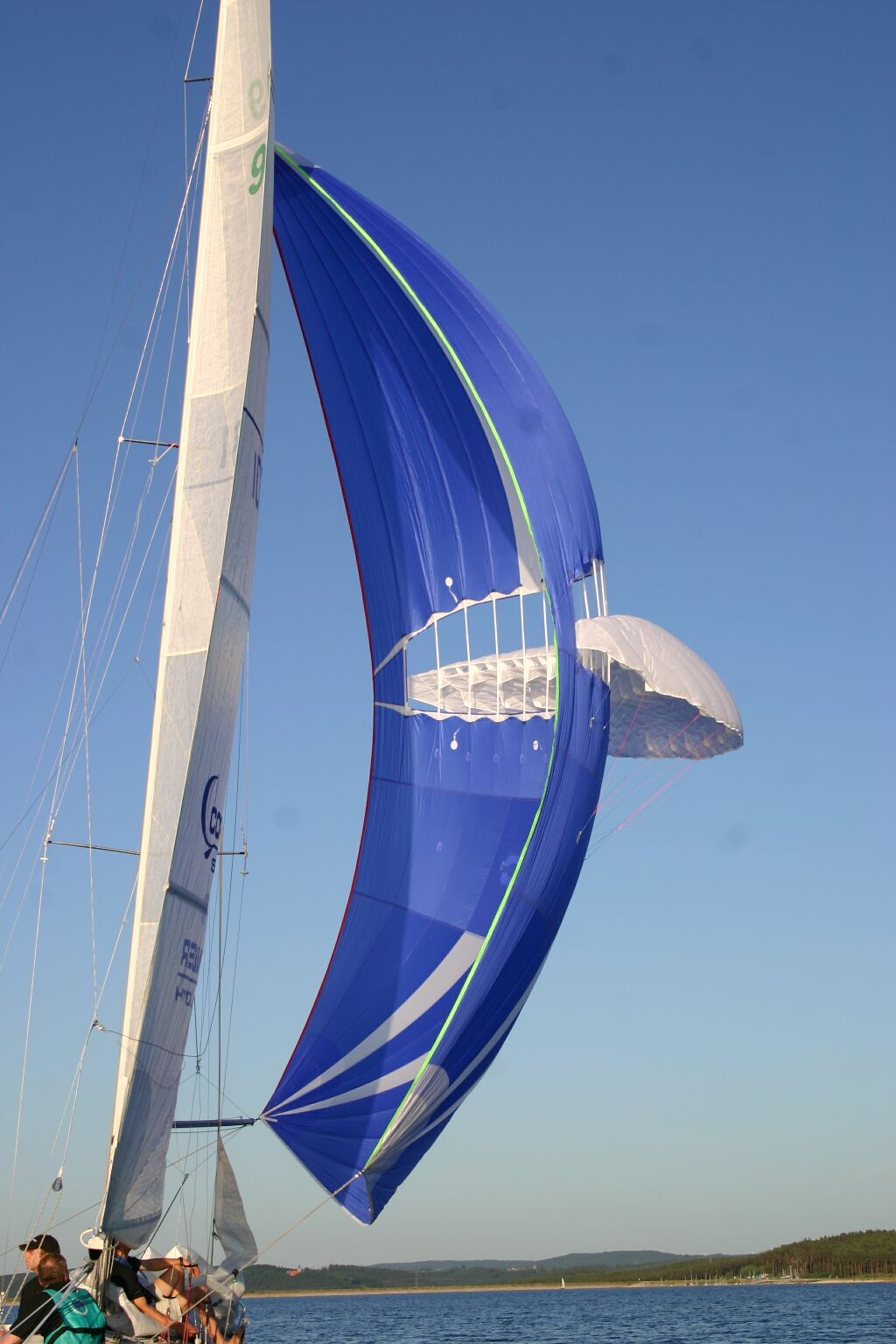
Sail twist can be seen in the white mainsail of this sloop by comparing the straight line of the luff along the mast to the curve of the leech (edge closest to the photographer).

Sail twist is a phenomenon in sailing where the head of the sail is at a different angle of incidence from the foot of the sail in order to change the lift distribution with height. Twist is measured by comparing the angle of a straight line between the leading edge (luff) and trailing edge (leech) with that of the boom. Some twist is desirable, but too much can induce weather helm or ruin the slot between the mainsail and jib.

Three sail shape controls which control the leech tension, and therefore sail twist, are the mainsheet, the boom vang and the traveler. The mainsheet pulls the boom (and therefore the foot of the sail) primarily inwards at lower points of sail and downwards at higher points of sail. Manipulation of the traveler can counteract this because it always pulls the boom laterally. The vang on the other hand does the opposite, it always changes the height of the boom.

Computer cut sails can produce the amount of twist specified by the sailmaker, and in different conditions, different amounts of twist may be desirable. Less twist is generally desirable in light air conditions and slackening the luff tension will tighten the leech of the sail. This moves the center of effort on the sail toward the trailing edge and reduces twist thus making the sail more powerful but vulnerable to stalling.

== See also ==
- Wing twist
