= Locke =

Locke may refer to:

== People ==
- John Locke, English philosopher
- Locke (given name)
- Locke (surname), information about the surname and list of people

== Places in the United States ==
- Locke, California, a town
- Locke, Indiana, an unincorporated community
- Locke, New York, a town
- Locke Island, in the Columbia River in Washington
- Locke Township, Michigan, a township
- Mount Locke, the site of the McDonald Observatory in the Davis Mountains of West Texas

== Arts and entertainment ==
- Locke (film), a 2013 British film
- Locke the Superman, a 1980s manga series by Yuki Hijiri and its anime film adaptations

=== Fictional characters ===
- A family in the comic book series Locke & Key and its television series adaptation
- Jameson Locke, the protagonist of the video game Halo 5: Guardians
- John Locke (Lost), a character in the television series Lost
- Locke, a protagonist of the manga Locke the Superman
- Locke Cole, a character from the Final Fantasy VI video game
- Locke, the father of Knuckles the Echidna
- Locke Lamora, the protagonist of the novel The Lies of Locke Lamora
- Locke, pseudonym of Peter Wiggin in Ender’s Game by Orson Scott Card

== Other uses ==
- Locke High School, Los Angeles, California
