= Jeff Locke =

Jeff Locke may refer to:

- Jeff Locke (American football) (born 1989), American football punter
- Jeff Locke (baseball) (born 1987), American baseball pitcher
- Jeff Locke, guitarist and vocalist for Christian punk band The Blamed
