= Washout (aeronautics) =

Characteristic of aircraft wing design

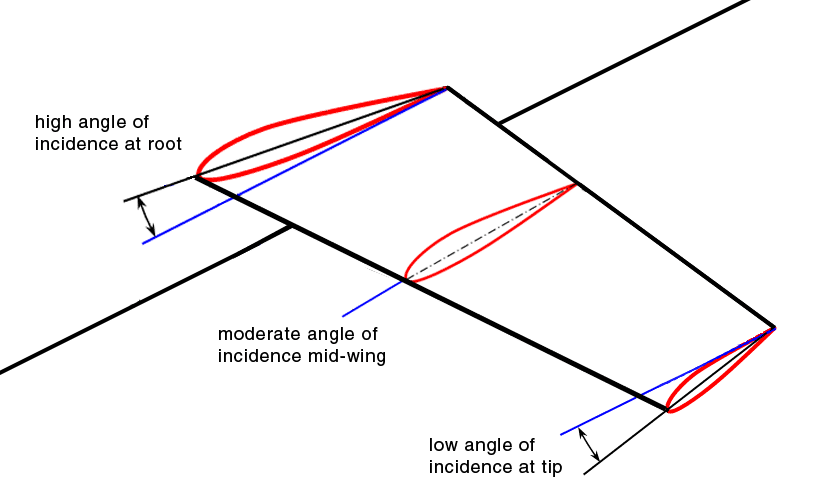
Washout reduces the angle of incidence from root to tip, thereby causing a lower angle of attack at the tips

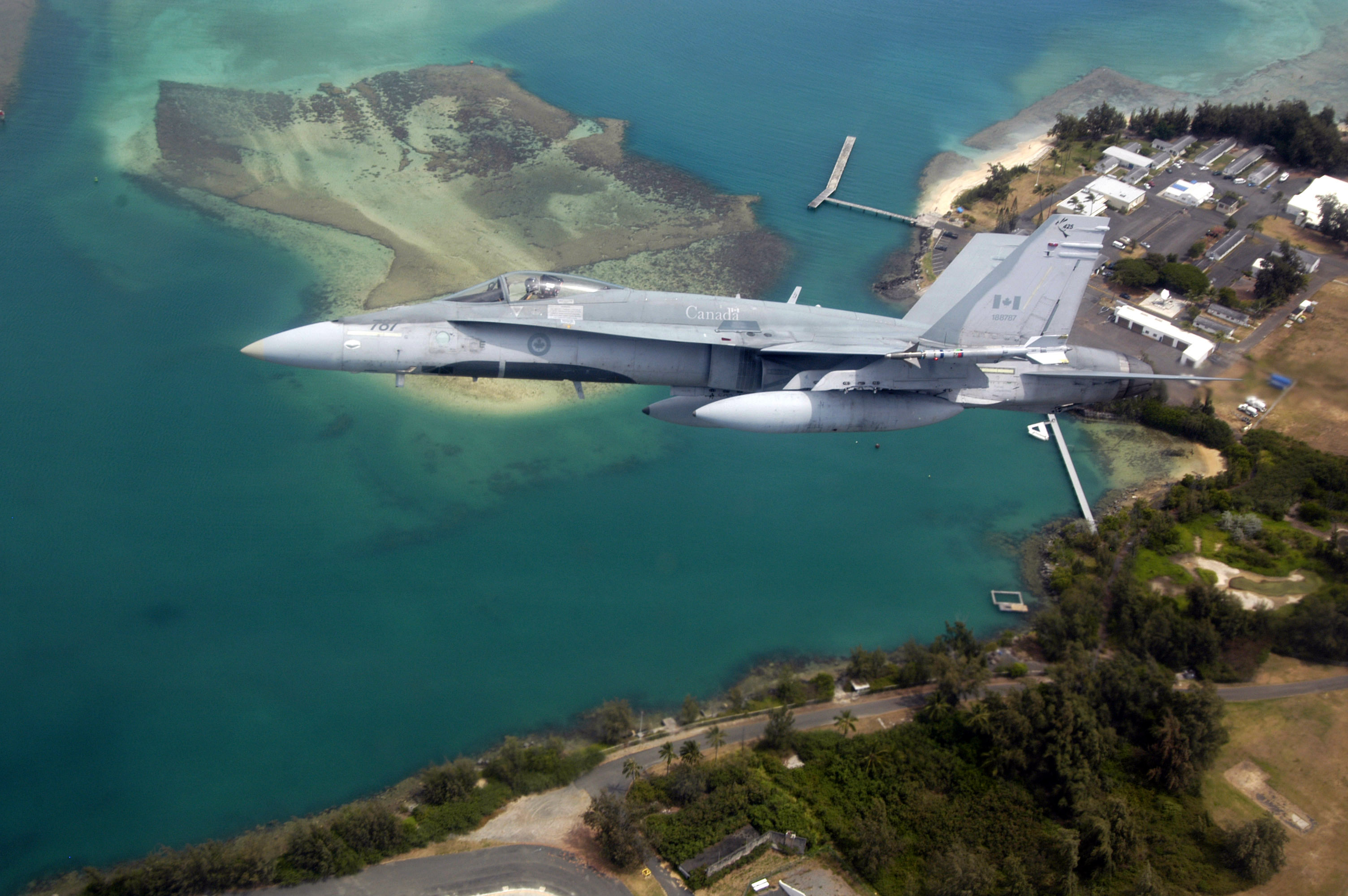
Washout is clearly visible in this image of a CF-18 Hornet. Note the angle of the Sidewinder missile on the wingtip rail as compared to the angle of attack of the fuselage. The Hornet has approximately 4 degrees of washout.

Washout is a characteristic of aircraft wing design which deliberately changes the lift distribution across the span of an aircraft’s wing. The wing is designed so that the angle of incidence is greater at the wing roots and decreases across the span, becoming lowest at the wing tip. This is usually to ensure that at stall speed the wing root stalls before the wing tips, providing the aircraft with continued aileron control and some resistance to spinning. Washout may also be used to modify the spanwise lift distribution to reduce lift-induced drag.

== Design considerations ==
Washout is commonly achieved by designing the wing with a slight twist, reducing the angle of incidence from root to tip, and therefore causing a lower angle of attack at the tips than at the roots. This feature is sometimes referred to as geometrical washout, to distinguish it from aerodynamic washout.

Wingtip stall is unlikely to occur symmetrically, especially if the aircraft is maneuvering. As an aircraft turns, the wing tip on the inside of the turn is moving more slowly and is most likely to stall. As an aircraft rolls, the descending wing tip is at higher angle of attack and is most likely to stall. When one wing tip stalls it leads to wing drop, a rapid rolling motion. Also, roll control may be reduced if the airflow over the ailerons is disrupted by the stall, reducing their effectiveness.

On aircraft with swept wings, wing tip stall also produces an undesirable nose-up pitching moment which hampers recovery from the stall.

Washout may be accomplished by other means e.g. modified aerofoil section, vortex generators, leading edge wing fences, notches, or stall strips. This is referred to as aerodynamic washout. Its purpose is to tailor the spanwise lift distribution or reduce the probability of wing tip stall.

Winglets have the opposite effect to washout. Winglets allow a greater proportion of lift to be generated near the wing tips. (This can be described as aerodynamic wash-in.) Winglets also promote a greater bending moment at the wing root, possibly necessitating a heavier wing structure. Installation of winglets may necessitate greater aerodynamic washout in order to provide the required resistance to spinning, or to optimise the spanwise lift distribution.

The reverse twist (higher incidence at wingtip), wash-in, can also be found in some designs though less common. The Grumman X-29 had strong wash-in to compensate for the additional root-first stalling promoted by the forward sweep.

Washout near the tips can also be used to decrease lift-induced drag, since at a lower angle of incidence, the lift produced will be lower, and thus the component of that lift which acts against thrust is reduced, however, it has been theorised by Albion H. Bowers that certain washout characteristics in the tips, that lead to a bell-shaped span loading may in fact produce lift-induced thrust, and upwash. He thus suggests that birds do not utilise vertical stabilisers, since they do not need to counteract adverse yaw caused by lift-induced drag.

Washout is also found in gliders and hang gliders.

In helicopters, blade twist is used to reduce lift towards the blade tip, thus reducing unequal rotor lift distribution.

== See also ==
- Dissymmetry of lift
- Wing twist
- Stall (flight)
- Spin (flight)
