= David Locke =

David Locke may refer to:

- David Ross Locke (1833–1888), American journalist and political commentator
- David H. Locke (1927–2019), American politician in the Massachusetts General Court
- David Locke (swimmer) (born 1972), Australian swimmer

== See also ==
- David Lock (born 1960), British barrister and former politician
