= Robert Heath Lock =

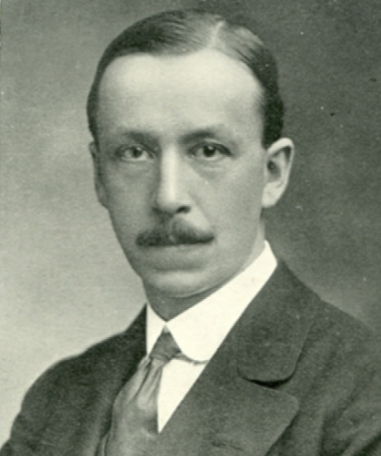

Robert Heath Lock (19 January 1879 – 26 June 1915) was an English botanist and geneticist who wrote the first English textbook on genetics.

== Life ==
Robert Heath Lock was the son of John Bascombe Lock, a priest and Eton College schoolmaster who was later bursar of Gonville and Caius College, Cambridge. His younger brother was C. N. H. Lock. He was born at Eton College on 19 January 1879, and educated at Charterhouse School, where he was a member of a winning 8 at Bisley. He was Frank Smart Student of Botany at Gonville & Caius, where he graduated with a first class degree in the Natural Sciences Tripos in 1902. While still an undergraduate, he accompanied William Bateson abroad.

In 1902 he was appointed Scientific Assistant to the Director of the Royal Botanical Gardens, Peradeniya in Sri Lanka (then known as Ceylon), under John Christopher Willis. He returned to Cambridge in 1905 to be Curator of the Cambridge University Herbarium. He was a fellow of Caius from 1904 to 1910, taking his ScD in 1910. From 1908 to 1913 he was Assistant Director to Willis at Peradeniya, serving as Acting Director in 1909 and 1912. He specialized in the breeding of Hevea brasiliensis for rubber production. He also created a new strain of rice, "Lock's paddy".

In 1910 Lock married Bella Sidney Woolf, the sister of Leonard Woolf. They had no children.

During World War I, he was chairman of a Vegetable Drying and Fruit Preserving Committee. He was an Inspector for the Board of Agriculture and Fisheries.

Lock died in Eastbourne on 26 June 1915, aged 36, from a heart attack following influenza. He is buried with his sister and brother-in-law in the Ascension Parish Burial Ground, Cambridge. His parents are also buried there.

== Textbook on genetics ==
Lock was the author of Recent Progress in the Study of Variation, Heredity, and Evolution, 1906. It went through five editions, with the fourth edition (1916) substantially revised by Leonard Doncaster published after Lock's death. It has been described as the first English textbook on genetics and was widely admired in America and the United Kingdom, however was essentially forgotten after World War I. The book inspired Hermann Joseph Muller and others to study genetics.

In 1907, it was positively reviewed in Nature and The American Naturalist journals. In 1908, Alfred Russel Wallace wrote supportively about the textbook:

In conclusion, I would suggest to those of my readers who are interested in the great questions associated with the name of Darwin, but who have not had the means of studying the facts either in the field or the library, that in order to obtain some real comprehension of the issue involved in the controversy now going on they should read at least one book on each side. The first I would recommend is a volume by Mr. R. H. Lock on “Variation, Heredity and Evolution” (1906) as the only recent book giving an account of the whole subject from the point of view of the Mendelians and Mutationists.

A. W. F. Edwards suggested Ronald Fisher was inspired by the book, writing:

it brought together (to quote from its chapter headings) evolution, the theory of natural selection, biometry, the theory of mutation, Mendelism, cytology, and eugenics, all in a single volume. Nowhere else could the young Fisher have found such a guide to the subjects that fascinated him over and above his student work for the Mathematical Tripos.

Lock was an advocate of Mendelian inheritance and mutationism.

== Works ==
- Studies in Plant Breeding in the Tropics, 1904
- Recent Progress in the Study of Variation, Heredity, and Evolution, 1906
- Rubber and Rubber Planting, 1913
