= Lock number =

In helicopter aerodynamics, the Lock number is the ratio of aerodynamic forces, which act to lift the rotor blades, to inertial forces, which act to maintain the blades in the plane of rotation. It is named after C. N. H. Lock, a British aerodynamicist who studied autogyros in the 1920s.

Typical rotorcraft blades have a Lock number between 3 and 12, usually approximately 8. The Lock number is typically 8 to 10 for articulated rotors and 5 to 7 for hingeless rotors. High-stiffness blades may have a Lock number up to 14.

Larger blades have a higher mass and more inertia, so tend to have a lower Lock number. Helicopter rotors with more than two blades can have lighter blades, so tend to have a higher Lock number.

A low Lock number gives good autorotation characteristics due to higher inertia, however this comes with a mass penalty.

Ray Prouty writes, "The previously discussed numbers: Mach, Reynolds and Froude are used in many fields of fluid dynamic studies. The Lock number is ours alone."

== Definitions ==
For a rectangular blade of radius $R$, and chord $c$, the Lock number $\gamma$, is calculated as,

$\gamma = \frac{\rho C_{L\alpha} c R^4}{I_b}$

where:

- $\rho$ is the density of air
- $C_{L\alpha}=\frac{\partial C_L}{\partial\alpha}$ is the lift-curve slope of the airfoil
- $I_b$ is the blade mass moment of inertia about the flapping axis.

== See also ==
- Coning
- Mach number
- Froude number
- Reynolds number
