= Matthew Locke =

Matthew Locke may refer to:

- Matthew Locke (administrator) (fl. 1660–1683), English Secretary at War from 1666 to 1683
- Matthew Locke (composer) (c. 1621–1677), English Baroque composer and music theorist
- Matthew Locke (North Carolina politician) (1730–1801), American politician from North Carolina
- Matthew Locke (soldier) (1974–2007), Australian soldier killed in Afghanistan
- Matthew Fielding Locke (1824–1911), American politician in Texas
