= C. N. H. Lock =

British aerodynamicist (1894–1949)

Christopher Noel Hunter Lock (21 December 1894 – 27 March 1949) was a British aerodynamicist, after whom the Lock number is named.

== Biography ==
Lock was born at Herschel House, Cambridge, the youngest son of John Bascombe Lock (18 March 1849 – 8 September 1921) who was bursar of Gonville and Caius College, Cambridge, and Emily née Baily. His brother was Robert Heath Lock. Lock was a Scholar at Charterhouse School, and in 1912 was awarded a Major Scholarship at Gonville and Caius College, where he was the only b* wrangler of 1917. He took his BA in 1917, won a Smith's Prize in 1919, and became a fellow of Caius College in 1920.

He was a member of the Anti-Aircraft Experimental Section, and in 1920 moved to the Aerodynamics Division of the National Physical Laboratory in Teddington, to work on the dynamics of shells. He conducted wide-ranging experiments, including on autogyros, and became an authority on airscrews. From 1939 until his death, he ran the Aerodynamics Division's High Speed Research Group. He developed the pitot-traverse method for measuring profile drag, and investigated the effect of sweepback at high Mach numbers.

He was a Fellow of the Royal Aeronautical Society and the Physical Society. He was a member of various committees of the Aeronautical Research Council.

== Personal life ==
Lock married Lilian Mary née Gillman (1886/7 – 7 October 1966, aged 79) on 26 April 1924, at St Leonard's Church, Streatham. They had two sons, Robert Christopher (Robin) Lock (14 August 1925 – 19 March 1992) and John Michael Lock (25 October 1926 – 2 March 2002), who were both research students at Gonville & Caius.
