= John Locke (naturalist) =

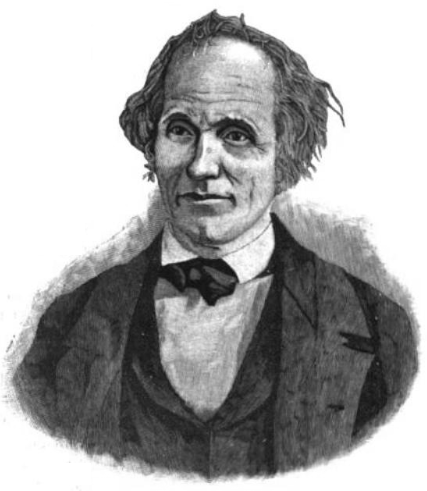
- Born: February 19, 1792; Lempster, New Hampshire, US
- Died: July 10, 1856 (aged 64); Cincinnati, Ohio, US
- Education: Yale School of Medicine
- Occupations: Naturalist, professor, photographer, publisher
- Spouse: Mary Morris (m. 1825)

John Locke (February 19, 1792 – July 10, 1856) was an American naturalist, professor, photographer, and publisher. He was the first American to exhibit photographs to the public.

== Biography ==
John Locke was born in Lempster, New Hampshire on February 19, 1792. He graduated from Yale School of Medicine in 1818, but gave up medical practice in favor of teaching.

He married Mary Morris on October 25, 1825.

Locke made a geological survey of Ohio in 1838, some of which was included in Ephraim George Squier and Edwin Hamilton Davis' Ancient Monuments of the Mississippi Valley (1848). He was elected as a member of the American Philosophical Society in 1844.

He died in Cincinnati on July 10, 1856.
