= Wing fence =

Fixed aerodynamic dividers attached to aircraft wings to prevent their stalling

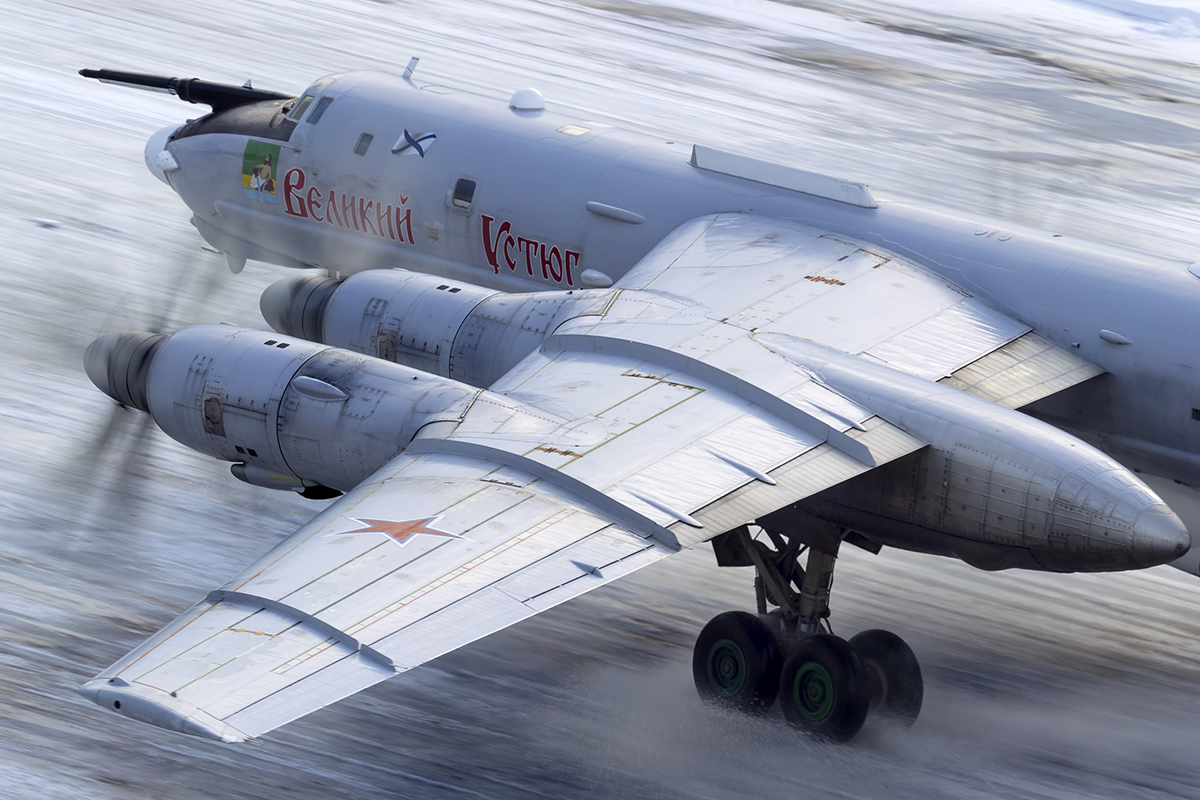
Three wing fences are installed on the wing of a Tu-95

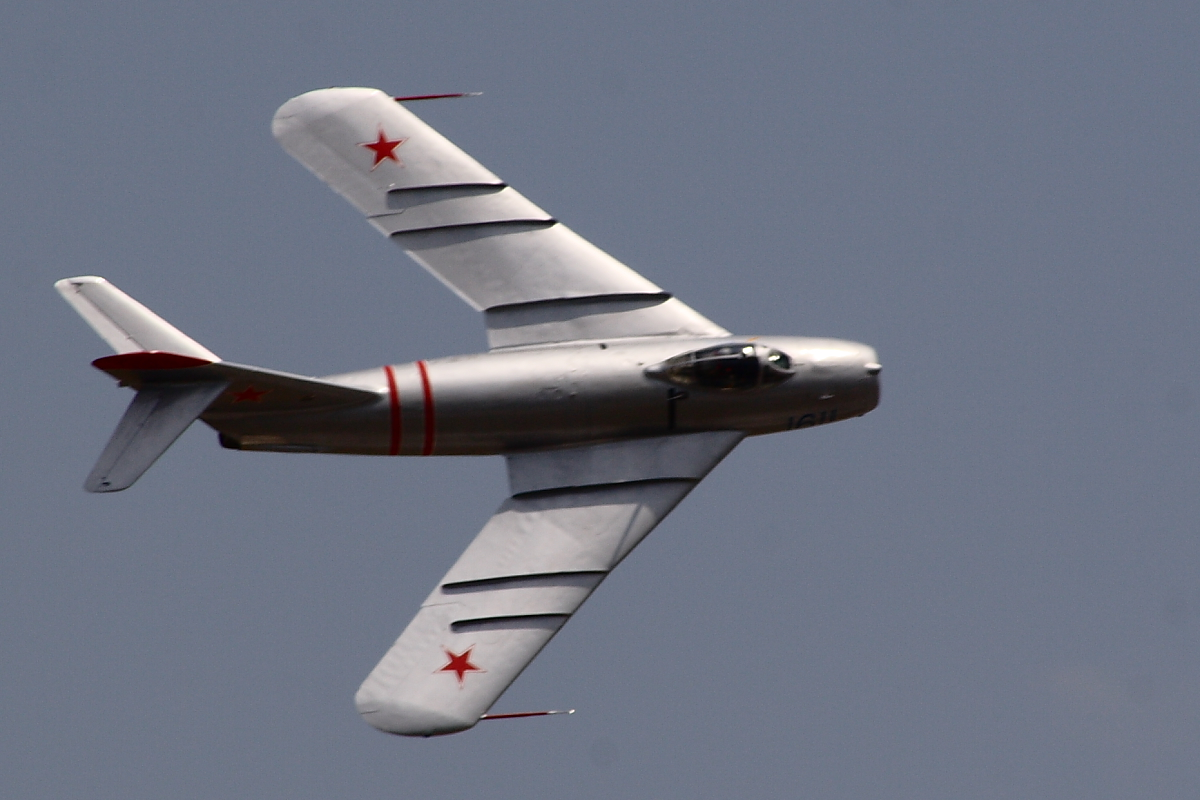
The MiG-17 included prominent wing fences

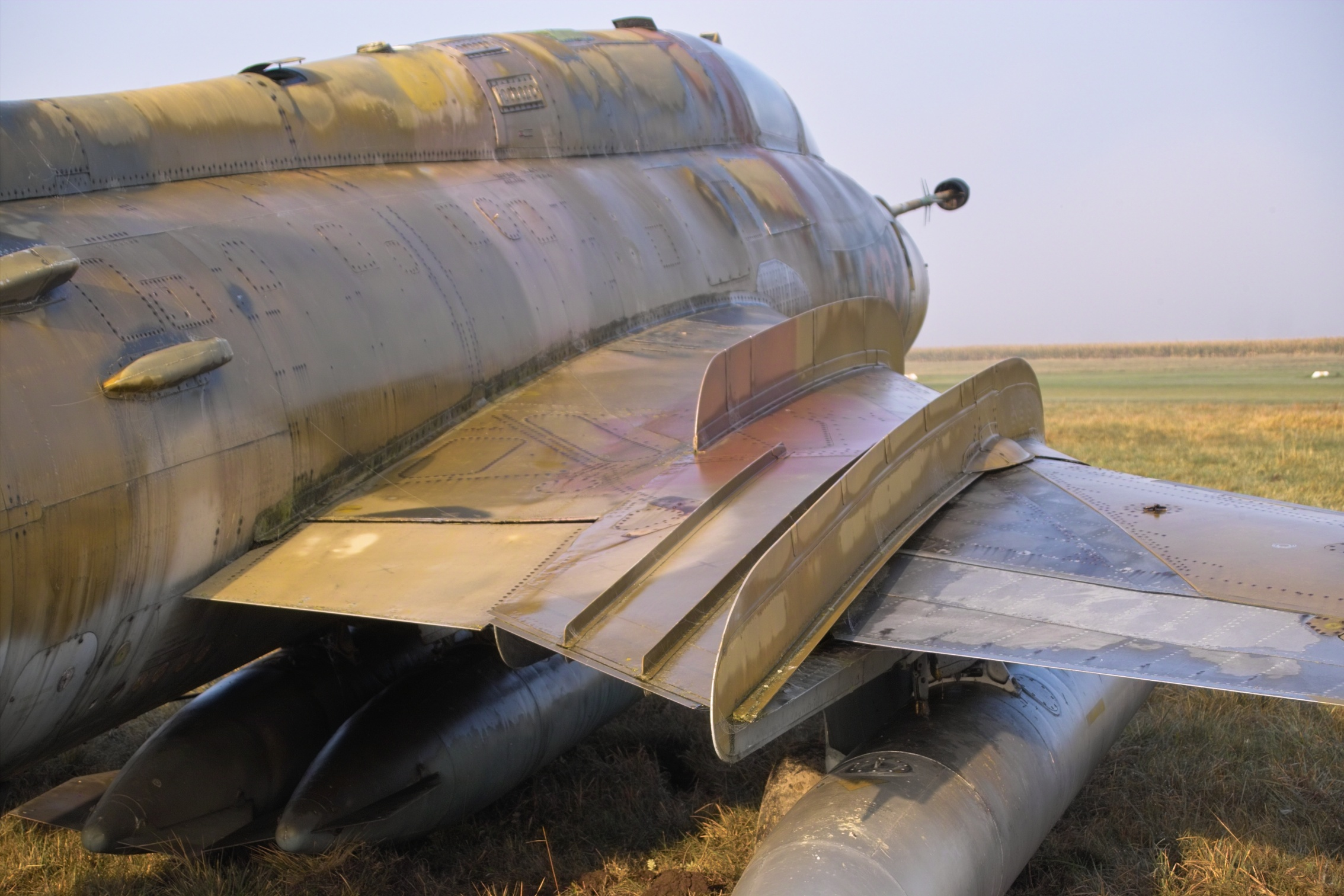
Close up of the wing fences of a Sukhoi Su-22. This plane was used by Former East German Air Force and retired after German unification.

Wing fences, also known as boundary layer fences and potential fences are fixed aerodynamic devices attached to aircraft wings. Often seen on swept-wing aircraft, wing fences are flat plates fixed to the upper surfaces parallel to the wing chord and in line with the free stream airflow, typically wrapping around the leading edge. By obstructing span-wise airflow along the wing, they prevent the entire wing from stalling at once, as opposed to wingtip devices, which increase aerodynamic efficiency by seeking to recover wing vortex energy.

As a swept-wing aircraft slows toward the stall speed of the wing, the angle of the leading edge forces some of the airflow sidewise, toward the wing tip. This process is progressive: airflow near the middle of the wing is affected not only by the leading edge angle, but also the spanwise airflow from the wing root. At the wing tip the airflow can end up being almost all spanwise, as opposed to front-to-back over the wing, meaning that the effective airspeed drops well below the stall. Because the geometry of swept wings typically places the wingtips of an aircraft aft of its center of gravity, lift generated at the wingtips tends to create a nose-down pitching moment. When the wingtips stall, both the lift and the associated nose-down pitching moment rapidly diminish. The loss of the nose-down pitching moment leaves the previously balanced aircraft with a net nose-up pitching moment. This forces the nose of the aircraft up, increasing the angle of attack and leading to stall over a greater portion of the wing. The result is a rapid and powerful pitch-up followed by a complete stall, a difficult situation for a pilot to recover from. The "Sabre dance" (which caused many F-100 Super Sabres to crash) is a notable example of this behavior.

Wing fences delay, or eliminate, these effects by preventing the spanwise flow from moving too far along the wing and gaining speed. When meeting the fence, the air is directed back over the wing surface. Similar solutions included a notch or dogtooth in the leading edge, as seen on the Avro Arrow, or the use of slats, as on the earlier versions of the F-86. Slats can act as fences directly, in the form of their actuators, but also reduce the problem by improving the angle of attack response of the wing and moving the stall point to a lower speed.

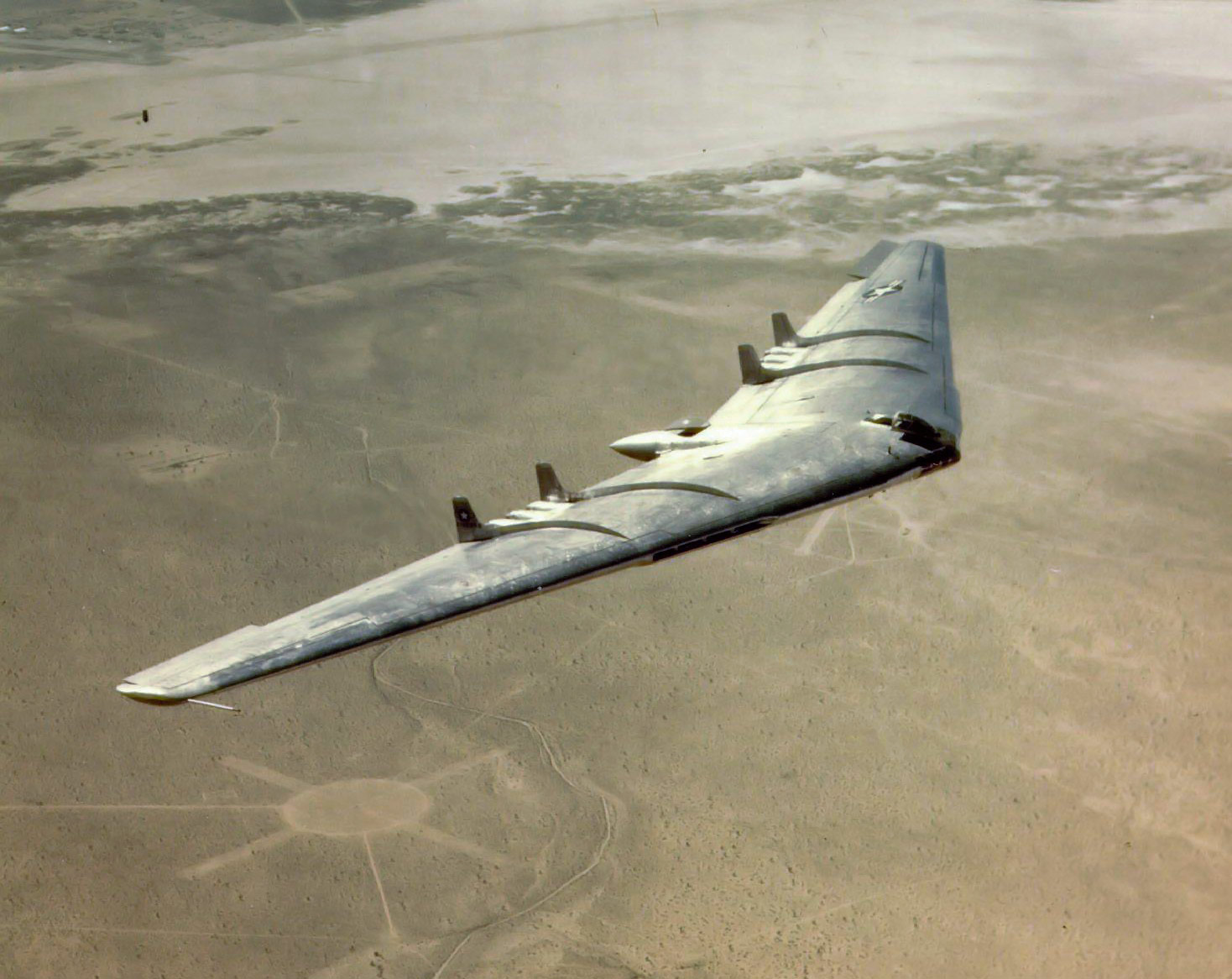
Northrop YB-49 Flying wing, a heavy bomber prototype. First flight in 1947

Although wing fences over the wing have been known in the UK since 1914, probably due to the RAF's spin research program begun as early as 1912, the invention of the fences is often attributed to German aerodynamicist Liebe of Messerschmitt, with a patent application in 1938.

By 1947, after the introduction of subsonic swept wings, fences independently implemented in the USSR and the US: Lavochkin La-160, Mikoyan MiG-15, Northrop YB-49, McDonnell XF-85. But in the USSR such fences were used more often and for the longest time, they were made large and numerous: from MiG-15 to MiG-25, from Tu-128 to Tu-160, from Su-7 to Su-22.

Wing fences reduce induced drag by increasing the height of the lifting system, but they are not as effective as wingtip devices.

== See also ==
- Vortilon, a similar device mounted on the underside of the wing
- Forward-swept wing, in which the fuselage itself acts somewhat like a wing fence
