= Unequal rotor lift distribution =

Unequal rotor lift distribution is an effect where the blades of a helicopter rotor generate more lift at the rotor tips than at the rotor hub.

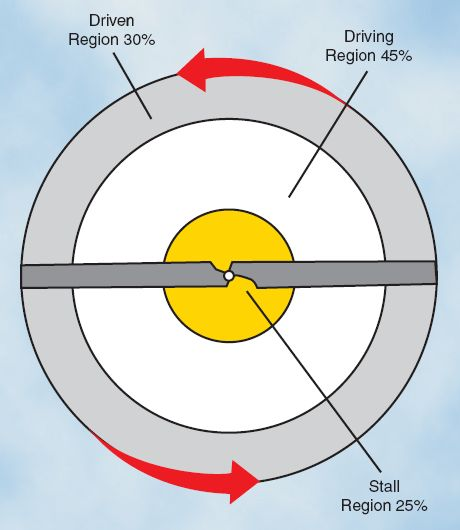
Overhead view of helicopter rotors. The rotor tips travel much faster than the inner sections, so produce more lift. (For the purposes of this article, the demarcated circular regions are irrelevant and should be ignored.)

A helicopter rotor blade is an airfoil, which is driven through the air to create lift. The lift generated is proportional to the square of the speed. Because the tips of the rotating blades travel much faster through the air than the parts of the blades near the hub, they generate much more lift.

If not mitigated, this effect would cause large bending stresses in the blade. In addition, the tip would have to be made stronger to handle the increased load. Helicopter manufacturers use the following techniques to equalise lift across the blade:

- Washout is a geometric twist in the blade, such that the blade root near the hub has a higher angle-of-attack, thus higher lift.
- Varying the airfoil cross-section, such as flattening the airfoil towards the tip, or tapering the blade towards the tip, which reduces its surface area thus reducing lift.

These techniques also equalise drag and downwash along the blade.

The high twisting necessary for good hover performance unfortunately causes vibrations at high forward speeds, because the angle of attack of the blade tips may become negative, so a compromise is typically made. Tiltrotor aircraft such as the Bell Boeing V-22 Osprey are able to use more blade twist.

There is also a limit to how tapered the blade tips can be, because the tips need sufficient mass to reduce vibrations and increase inertia after an engine failure. In practice, most helicopters use blade twist but not taper, because efficiency gains from taper are small but construction is more difficult.

It is not possible to equalise rotor lift distribution at all rotor speeds, because lift increases quadratically with airspeed.

== See also ==
- Coning
- Dissymmetry of lift
- Blade element theory
