= John Bascombe Lock =

John Bascombe Lock (18 March 1849–8 Sep 1921) was an English priest and academic, who was bursar of Gonville and Caius College, Cambridge and author of several mathematical textbooks.

He was born 18 March 1849 in Dorchester, son of Joseph Lock (27 Sep 1811–17 Jan 1877), a butcher and farmer, and Elizabeth Marvin née Wills. He was baptised on 24 June 1849 at St Peter's Church, Dorchester. He was educated at William Barnes's School, Dorchester; Bristol Grammar School; and Gonville and Caius College, Cambridge, where he gained his BA in 1872. He was ordained deacon in 1872, and priest in 1873. He was assistant master at Eton College from 1872 to 1884, living there in the 1881 census.

From 1874 he was a fellow at Caius, and bursar from 1889 until his death. He was instrumental in the creation of many university buildings. He was also the Chairman of Addenbrooke's Hospital. In 1901 he founded the Gog Magog Golf Club.

On 23 Dec 1873 he married Emily née Baily (1 Oct 1851–14 Sep 1937) in Cirencester. They had 5 sons and 2 daughters, including geneticist Robert Heath Lock, aerodynamicist C. N. H. Lock, and medical doctor John Lewis Lock (1874–1940). Lock died at his home, Herschel House (later demolished) in Cambridge. He is buried in St Giles's Cemetery, Cambridge.
