= Trinity College Chapel, Cambridge =

University church in Cambridge, England

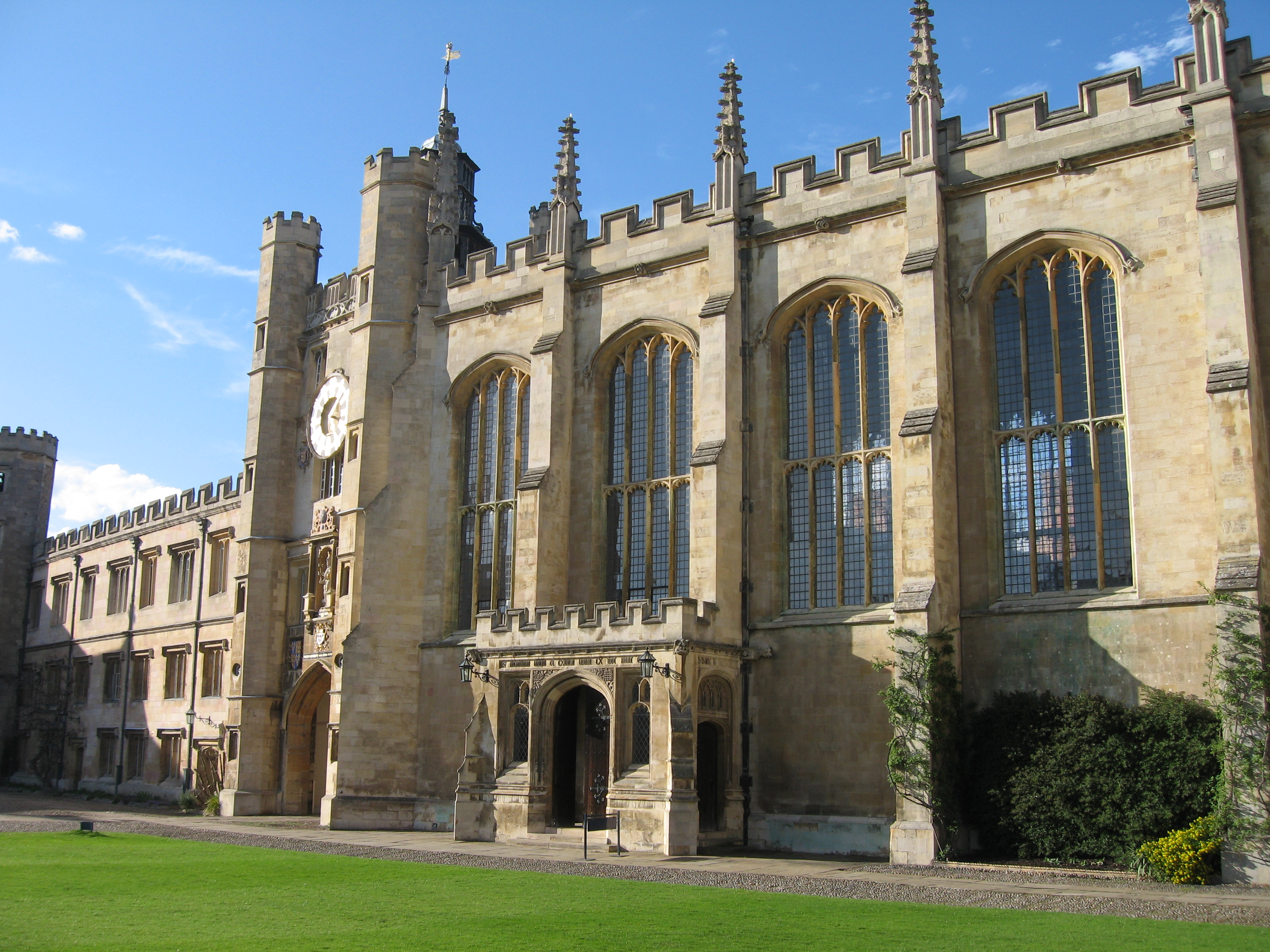
- Trinity College Chapel
- Trinity College Chapel, Cambridge
- 52.2074°N 0.1175°E
- OS grid reference: TL 44696 58629
- Location: Trinity College, Cambridge
- Country: England
- Denomination: Anglican
- Tradition: Anglo-Catholic

History
- Founded: 1567
- Founder(s): Mary I of England, Elizabeth I

Architecture
- Functional status: Active
- Heritage designation: Grade I listed
- Designated: 25 April 1950
- Architectural type: Tudor Gothic
- Style: Perpendicular
- Years built: 1554–1555
- Completed: 1567

Specifications
- Length: 205 feet (62 m)
- Width: 33 feet (10 m)

Trinity College Chapel is the chapel of Trinity College, Cambridge, a constituent college of the University of Cambridge. Part of a complex of Grade I listed buildings at Trinity, it dates from the mid 16th century. It is an Anglican church in the Anglo-Catholic tradition.

== Building and architecture ==
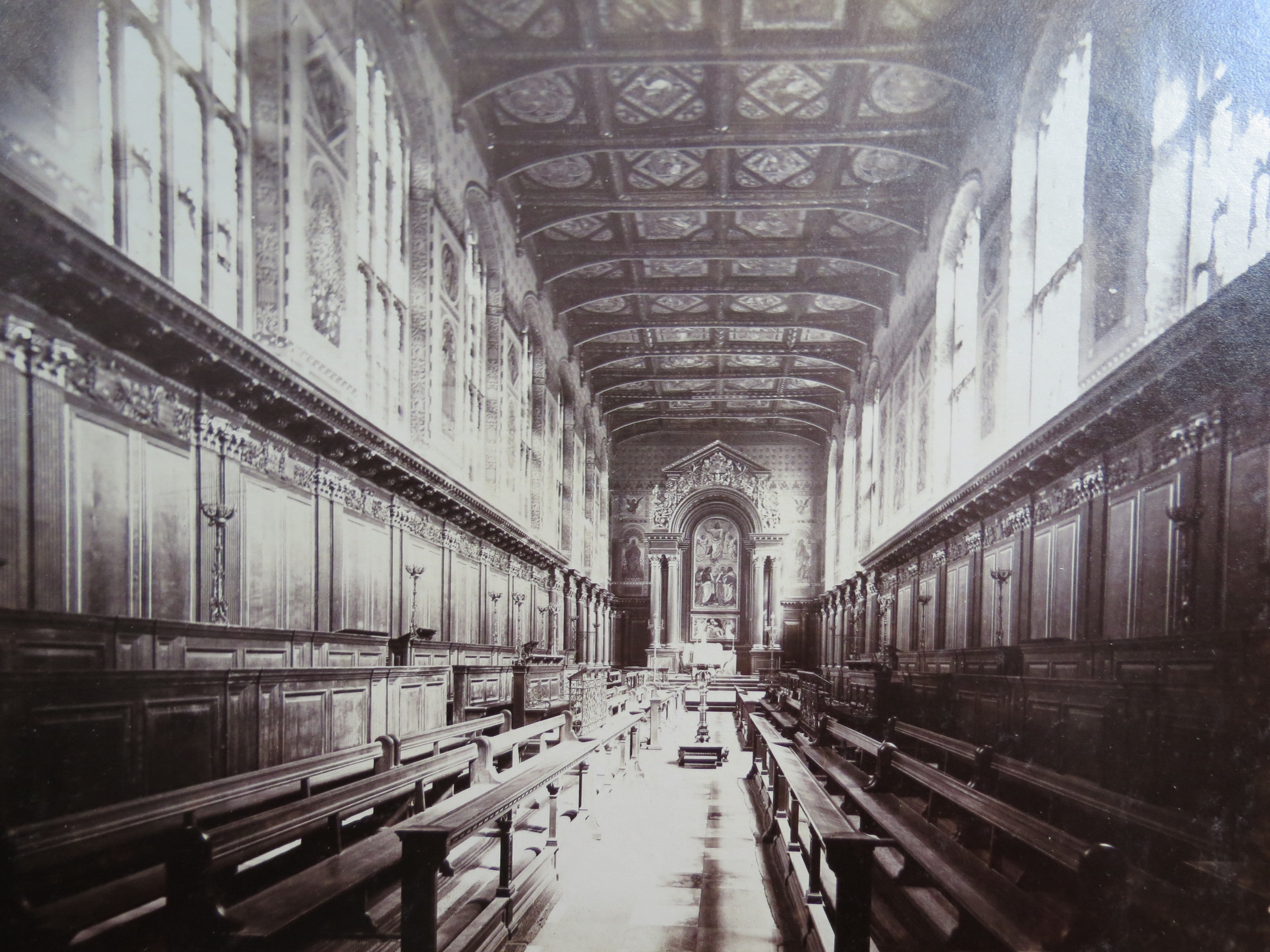
Chapel interior, c. 1870

The chapel was begun in 1554–55 by order of Queen Mary and was completed in 1567 by her half-sister, Elizabeth I. The architectural style is Tudor-Gothic, with Perpendicular tracery and pinnacles. The roof is of an earlier style than the rest of the building, and may have been re-used from the chapel of King's Hall, the college which preceded Trinity on this site. Only the walls and roof are of Tudor date, but the walls were re-faced in ashlar in the 19th century and present slate roof-covering is modern. The whole chapel was restored by Edward Blore in 1832 and further work took place between 1868 and 1873 when Arthur Blomfield added the vestry, Choir-room and porch, and the Chapel re-roofed, painted and glazed.

== Windows ==
The original white-glass windows with religious inscriptions were replaced as part of the redecoration of the chapel that took place between 1871 and 1875. The cost of the redecoration works was £20,000 (equivalent to £2.5 million in 2024) of which £11,000 (equivalent to £1.4 million in 2024) was raised by subscriptions. This late Victorian pictorial stained glass was designed by Pre-Raphaelite artist Henry Holiday to a scheme devised by Trinity theologians, B.F. Westcott and F.J.A. Hort. They comprise eight windows on the north side and seven on the south side of the quire, each depicting eight figures representing features or movements of the related period, in roughly historical sequence and arranged in an upper and lower row of four. The cost of the windows was supported by donors who were Trinity alumni themselves or given in dedication to the memory of alumni.

The table below contains details of each window, with Latin inscription and related article link.

Trinity College Chapel Windows
| Window | Theme | (West) People (East) | | | | Donor(s) |
|---|---|---|---|---|---|---|
| North 1 | Disciples of Christ | S. MARIA MAGD. Mary Magdalene | S. THOMAS; Thomas the Apostle | S. MARTHA; Martha | S. MARIA MARTHÆ SOROR; Mary, sister of Martha | T. J. Phillips Jodrell |
| North 1 | Disciples of Christ | NICODEMUS; Nicodemus | S. NATHANIEL; Saint Nathaniel | S. PHILIPPUS; Philip the Apostle | S. ANDREAS; Andrew the Apostle | T. J. Phillips Jodrell |
| South 1 | Evangelists and Teachers | S. IACOBUS MI. James the Less | S. PETRUS; Saint Peter | S. PAULUS; Paul the Apostle | APOLLOS; Apollos | Hugh Andrew Johnstone Munro |
| South 1 | Evangelists and Teachers | S. MATTHAEUS; Matthew the Apostle | S. MARCUS; Mark the Evangelist | S. LUCAS; Luke the Evangelist | S. JOHANNES; St John the Evangelist | Hugh Andrew Johnstone Munro |
| North 2 | The Ante-Nicene Church | S. CYPRIANUS; Cyprian | ORIGENES; Origen | TERTULLIANUS; Tertullian | S. PERPETUA; Perpetua | William George Clark |
| North 2 | The Ante-Nicene Church | S. PANTÆNUS; Pantænus | S. JUSTINUS MAR. Justin Martyr | S. IGNATIUS; Ignatius of Antioch | S. CLEMENS ROM. Pope Clement I | William George Clark |
| South 2 | The Church of the First Days | CORNELIVS; Cornelius the Centurion | S. DIONYSIVS; Dionysius the Areopagite | LYDIA; Lydia of Thyatira | ONESIMVS; Onesimus | Revd Henry John Hotham (Note: Hotham, Henry John, 1814–1900 (clergyman)) |
| South 2 | The Church of the First Days | S. BARNABAS; Barnabas | S. STEPHANVS; Saint Stephen | S. TIMOTHEVS; Saint Timothy | PHŒBE; Phoebe | Revd Henry John Hotham |
| North 3 | The Western Church | S. GREGORIUS M. Pope Gregory I | S. BENEDICTUS; Benedict of Nursia | S. LEO MAGNUS; Pope Leo I | S. MARTIN TUR. Martin of Tours | Revd Spencer Mansel, in memory of William Lort Mansel |
| North 3 | The Western Church | S. AUGUSTINUS HIP. Augustine of Hippo | S. MONNICA; Saint Monica | S. HIERONYMUS; Jerome | S. AMBROSIUS; Ambrose | Revd Spencer Mansel, in memory of William Lort Mansel |
| South 3 | The Eastern Church | EUSEBIUS PAMPH. Eusebius | IMP. CONSTANTINUS M. Constantine the Great | HELENA AUG. Helena, mother of Constantine I | IMP. JUSTINIANUS; Justinian I | Mrs Thrupp in memory of Joseph Francis Thrupp |
| South 3 | The Eastern Church | S. ATHANASIUS; Athanasius of Alexandria | S. BASILIUS M. Basil of Caesarea | S. EPHRAEM SYRUS; Ephrem the Syrian | S. JO. CHRYSOSTOMUS; John Chrysostom | Mrs Thrupp in memory of Joseph Francis Thrupp |
| North 4 | Latin Christianity | GIOTTUS; Giotto | FRANCISCUS ASSIS; Francis of Assisi | GREGORIUS VII; Pope Gregory VII | COLUMBANUS; Columbanus | Coutts Trotter |
| North 4 | Latin Christianity | DANTES ALLIGH; Dante Alighieri | LUDOVICUS IX; Louis IX of France | THOMAS AQUINAS; Thomas Aquinas | IMP. CAROLUS M. Charlemagne | Coutts Trotter |
| South 4 | The Anglo-Saxon Church | BONAFACIUS AP. GER. Saint Boniface | BEDA VENERABILIS; Bede | ALCUINUS; Alcuin | ALFREDUS REX; Alfred the Great | Mrs Mathison, in memory of the Revd William Collings Mathison (Note: Mathison, William Collings, 1817/8–1870 (educationalist and clergyman)) |
| South 4 | The Anglo-Saxon Church | ALBANUS MARTYR; Saint Alban | AUGUSTINUS ARCH. CANT. Augustine of Canterbury | BERTHA REG. CANT. Bertha of Kent | THEODORUS ARCH. CANT. Theodore of Tarsus | Mrs Mathison, in memory of the Revd William Collings Mathison |
| North 5 | English Ecclesiastical Life before the Reformation | WOLSEY CARDINALIS; Thomas Wolsey | GULIELMUS EP. WINTON; William of Wykeham | ROBERTUS EP. LINCOLN; Robert Grosseteste | HUGO EP. LINCOLN; Hugh of Avalon | Augustus Arthur VanSittart |
| North 5 | English Ecclesiastical Life before the Reformation | STEPHANUS ARCHIEP. CANT. Stephen Langton | THOMAS ARCHIEP. CANT. Thomas Becket | ANSELMUS ARCHIEP. CANT. Anselm of Canterbury | LANFRANCUS ARCHIEP. CANT; Lanfranc | Augustus Arthur VanSittart |
| South 5 | English National Life before the Reformation | EDWARDUS WALL PR. Edward the Black Prince | JO. DUNS SCOTUS; Duns Scotus | GALFR. CHAUCER; Geoffrey Chaucer | GULL. CAXTON; William Caxton | Joseph Barber Lightfoot |
| South 5 | English National Life before the Reformation | SIMON DE MONTFORT; Simon de Montfort, 6th Earl of Leicester | MATTHÆUS PARIS; Matthew Paris | EDWARDUS PRIMUS; Edward I of England | FR. ROGER BACON; Roger Bacon | Joseph Barber Lightfoot |
| North 6 | Founders and Benefactors of the University and College | MARIA REG. Mary I of England | HENRICUS VIII; Henry VIII of England | EDWARDUS III; Edward III of England | HERV. DE STANTON; Hervey de Stanton | Benjamin Gray |
| North 6 | Founders and Benefactors of the University and College | H. DE BALSHAM EP. EL. Hugh de Balsham | HENRICUS III; Henry III of England | ETHELDREDA ABB. Æthelthryth | SIGEBERTUS ANGLOR. REX; Sigeberht of East Anglia | Benjamin Gray |
| South 6 | The English Reformation | H. LATIMER EP. VIG. Hugh Latimer | EDWARDUS VI; Edward VI | N. RIDLEY EP. LOND. Nicholas Ridley | ELIZABETH REG. Elizabeth I | Robert Burn |
| South 6 | The English Reformation | IO. WYCLIFFE; John Wycliffe | DES. ERASMUS; Erasmus | W. TYNDALE; William Tyndale | T. CRANMER ARCHIEP. Thomas Cranmer | Robert Burn |
| North 7 | University and College Worthies | T. NEVILE; Thomas Nevile | IO. WHITGIFT ARCH. John Whitgift | M. BUCER; Martin Bucer | IO. REDMAN; John Redman | Edward William Blore |
| North 7 | University and College Worthies | C. TUNSTALL. EP. DUN. Cuthbert Tunstall | IO. FISHER EP. ROFF. John Fisher | IO. DE BAGGESHOTE; John de Baggeshott (Note: John de Baggeshott: First Warden of the King’s Scholars, 1316) | GU. DE BUXTON; Walter de Buxton (Note: Walter de Buxton: Master of Michaelhouse 1324–1328) | Edward William Blore |
| South 7 | Worthies of the College | H. SPELMAN; Henry Spelman | IO. DOM. CRAVEN; John Craven, 1st Baron Craven of Ryton | A. MARVEL; Andrew Marvell | IO. HACKET EP. LICH. John Hacket | M.R. Cope, Esq., in memory of his brother, the Revd Edward Meredith Cope |
| South 7 | Worthies of the College | FR. BACON; Francis Bacon | IO. DONNE; John Donne | G. HERBERT; George Herbert | E. COKE. Edward Coke | M.R. Cope, Esq., in memory of his brother, the Revd Edward Meredith Cope |
| North 8 | Worthies of Trinity College | R. BENTLEY; Richard Bentley | IS. NEWTON; Isaac Newton | R. COTES; Roger Cotes | IO. RAY; John Ray | Joseph Prior, (Note: Prior, Joseph (1854–1918) Fellow and Tutor of Trinity College Cambridge) Mrs Thompson in memory of George Peacock and Charles de la Pryme in memory of George Pryme |
| North 8 | Worthies of Trinity College | IO. DRYDEN; John Dryden | A. COWLEY; Abraham Cowley | IS. BARROW; Isaac Barrow | IO. PEARSON; John Pearson | Joseph Prior, Mrs Thompson in memory of George Peacock and Charles de la Pryme in memory of George Pryme |

== Memorials ==
There are many memorials to former fellows of Trinity within the chapel, some statues, some brasses, including two memorials to graduates and fellows who died during both World Wars. There are also several graves dating from earlier periods.

== Organ ==
The chapel has a fine organ, originally built by "Father" Smith in 1694. Many alterations were made over the years until, in 1913, an almost totally new organ was built. Some of the pipes were so large that they would not fit in the organ loft and instead had to stand in a corner of the ante-chapel. In 1976 the present mechanical-action instrument, based on the surviving pipework and within the original cases, was completed by the Swiss firm Metzler Söhne. There are regular recitals on Sundays during term time.

== Choir ==
The Choir of Trinity College, Cambridge is composed of around thirty male and female Choral Scholars and two Organ Scholars, all of whom are students at the University. Besides singing the liturgy in the chapel, the choir has an extensive programme of performances and recordings. The current Director of Music is Steven Grahl.

== Burial ground ==
The Ascension Parish Burial Ground contains the graves or interred cremations of twenty-seven fellows of Trinity College, including three Vice-Masters.

== List of deans of Chapel ==
The Dean of Chapel holds responsibility for the Chapel and the Clergy at Trinity.

- 1873–1877: Handley Moule
- ? – ? Frederick Arthur Simpson
- 1923–1943: Hugh Fraser Stewart
- 1943–1958: John Burnaby
- 1958-1969: Harry Williams
- 1969–1983: John Robinson
- 1984–1991: John Bowker
- 1991–2006: Arnold Browne
- 2006–present: Michael Banner

== List of memorials/graves ==
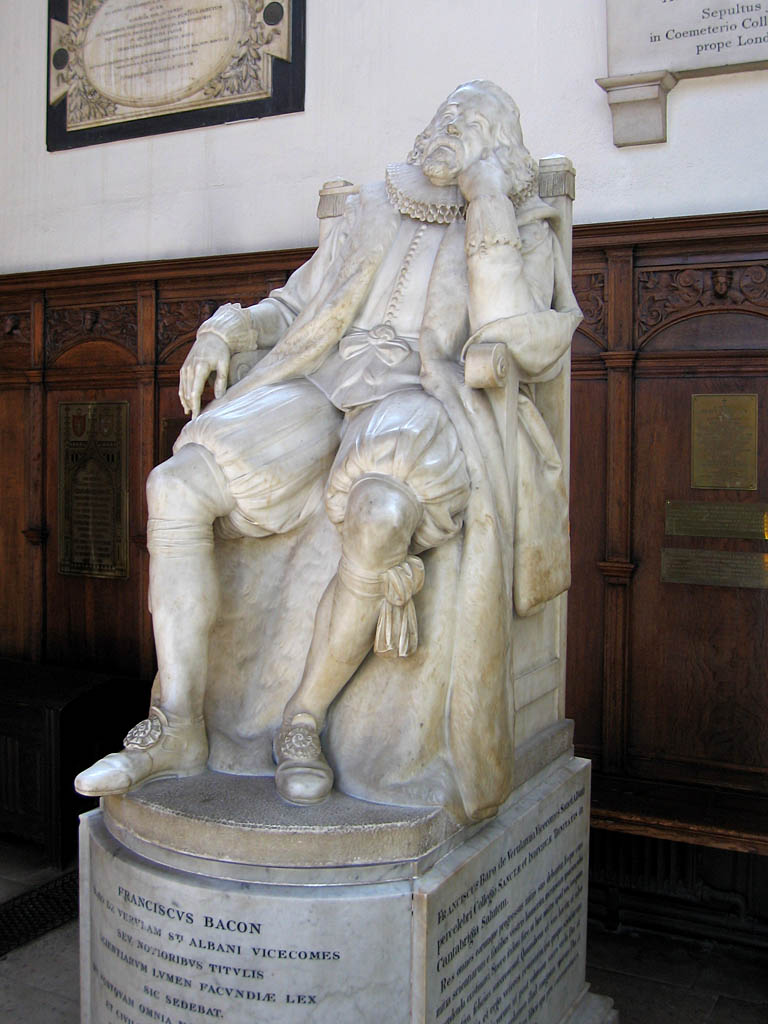
Statue of Francis Bacon by Henry Weekes

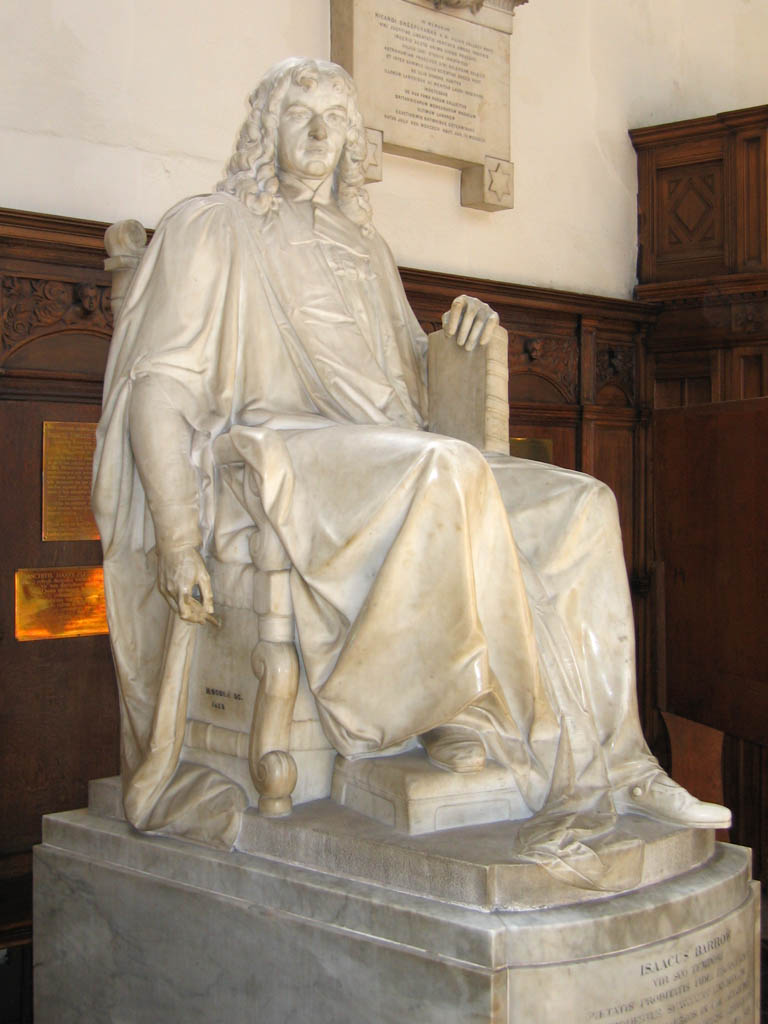
Statue of Isaac Barrow by Matthew Noble

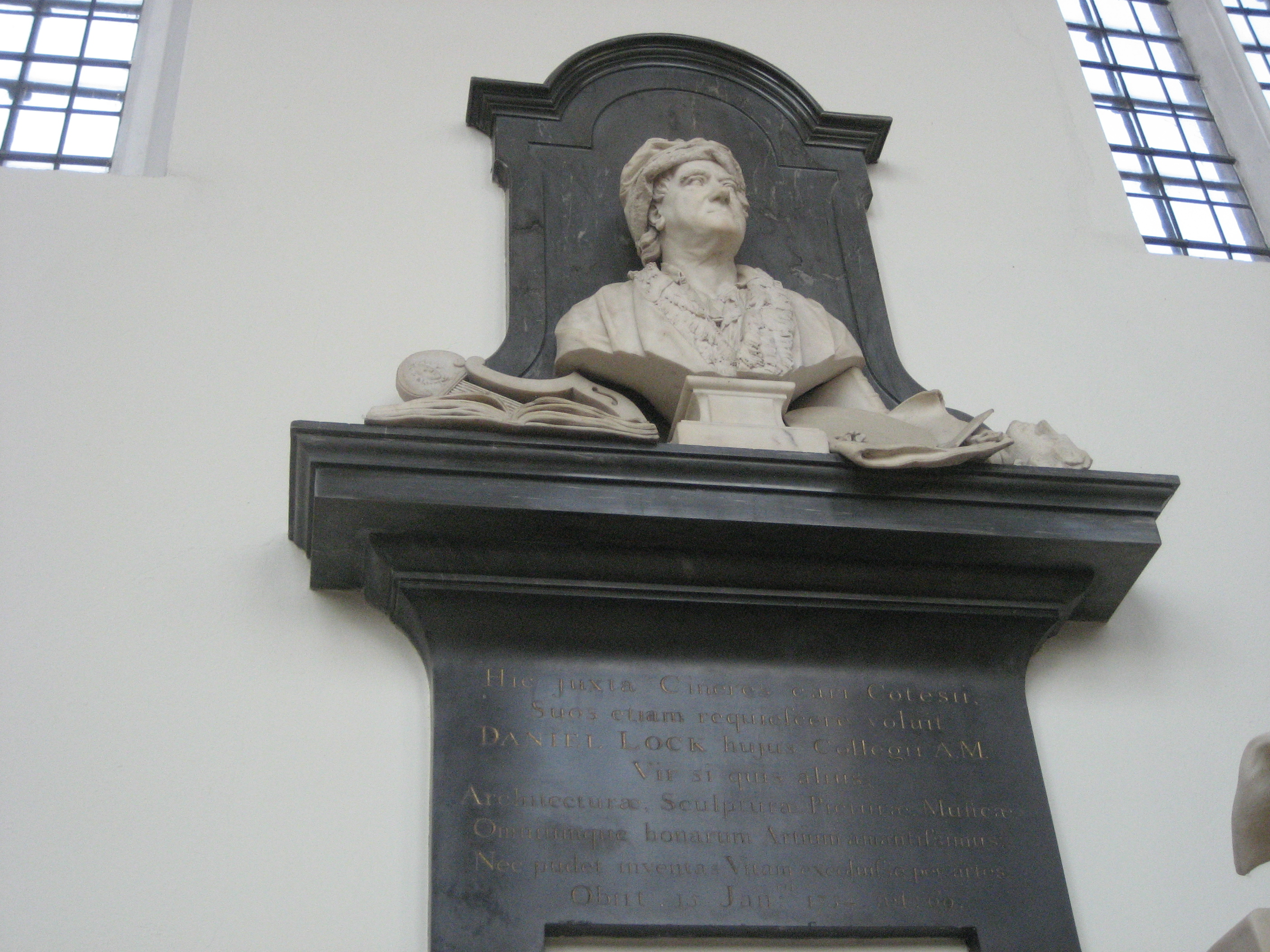
Daniel Lock by Louis-François Roubiliac

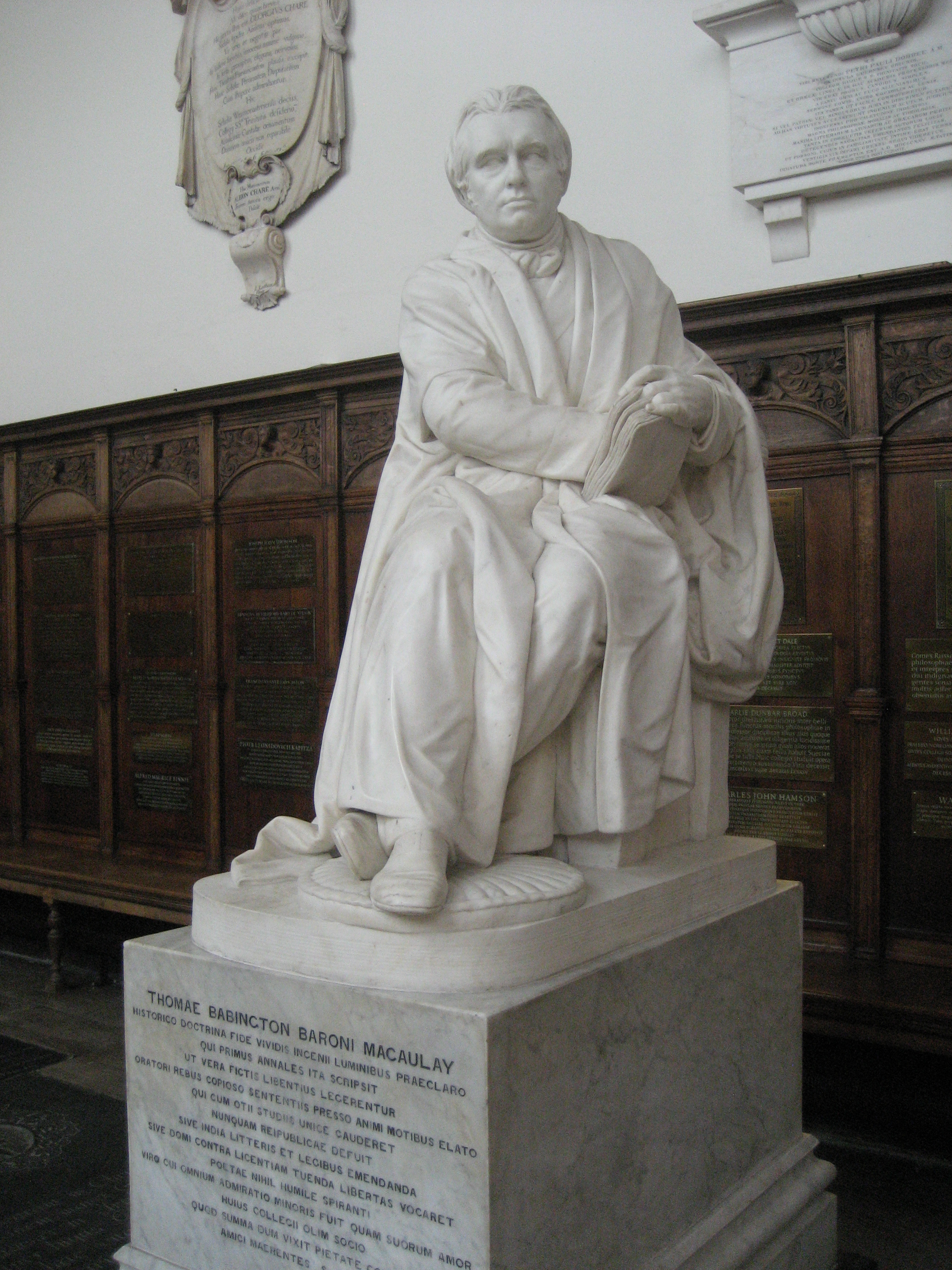
Thomas Babington Macaulay by Thomas Woolner

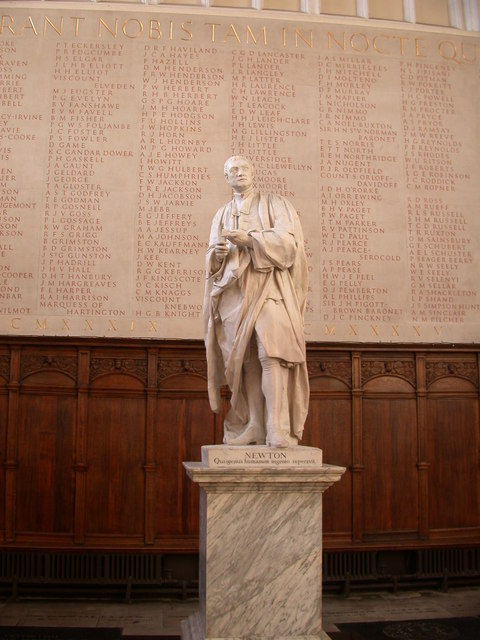
Statue of Isaac Newton by Roubillac

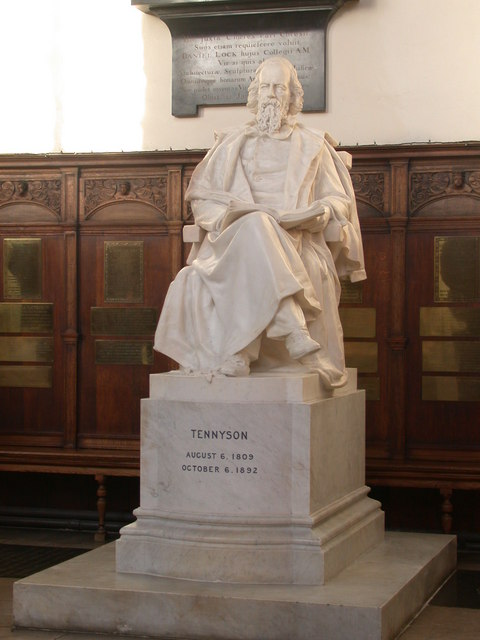
Statue of Alfred, Lord Tennyson

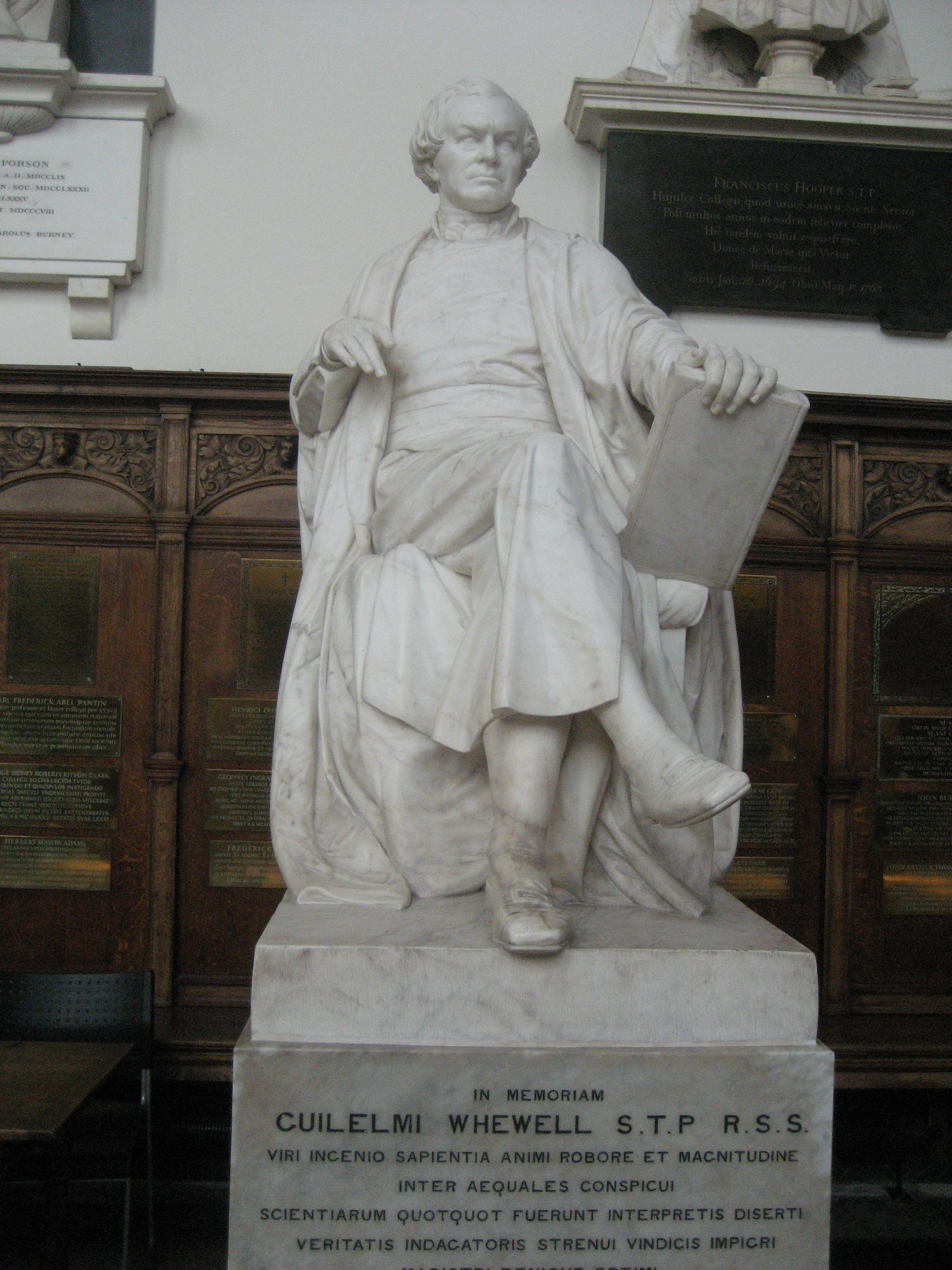
William Whewell by Thomas Woolner

| Name | Artefact | Notes |
|---|---|---|
| Herbert Mayow Adams | Brass | |
| John Frank Adams | Brass | |
| Edgar Douglas Adrian | Brass | |
| Richard Appleton | Brass | |
| William Joscelyn Arkell | Brass | |
| Francis William Aston | Brass | |
| Humphrey Babington | Interment | |
| Francis Bacon | Statue | by Weekes, 1845, donated by Daniel Lock. |
| Thomas Bainbrig | Interment | |
| Francis Maitland Balfour | Brass | |
| Isaac Barrow | Statue | by Noble, 1853 presented 1858. |
| Edward Bathurst | Interment | |
| John Beaumont | Interment | Fellow. d. 6 June 1565. Buried in Ante-Chapel. |
| William John Beaumont | Interment | |
| Edward White Benson | Brass | |
| Richard Bentley | Interment | |
| Abram Samoilovitch Besicovitch | Brass | |
| Anthony Ashley Bevan | Brass | |
| Alfred Maurice Binnie | Brass | |
| Maurice Black | Brass | |
| Edward William Blore | Brass | |
| Edward William Blore | Interment | |
| Anchitel Harry Fletcher Boughey | Brass | |
| William Lawrence Bragg | Brass | |
| Daniel Bratteli | Interment | |
| Charlie Dunbar Broad | Brass | |
| Benjamin Chapman Browne | Brass | |
| Isaac Hawkins Browne | Sculpture | |
| John(?) Browning | Interment | d.1598. Buried in Ante-Chapel floor. |
| Francis Crawford Burkitt | Brass | |
| Robert Burn | Brass | |
| John Burnaby | Brass | |
| Samuel Henry Butcher | Brass | |
| Henry Montagu Butler | Brass | |
| James Ramsay Montagu Butler | Brass | |
| Richard Austen Butler | Brass | |
| John Walton Capstick | Brass | |
| Edward Hallett Carr | Brass | |
| Arthur Cayley | Brass | |
| George Chare | Sculpture | |
| George Chare | Interment | |
| George Sidney Roberts Kitson Clark | Brass | |
| John Willis Clark | Brass | |
| Gerard Francis Cobb | Brass | |
| Patrick Cock | Interment | |
| Nathanael Cole | Interment | |
| John Cooper | Interment | Fellow and Proctor. Vicar of Barrington. Died 9 December 1714. |
| William Corker | Interment | |
| Francis MacDonald Cornford | Brass | |
| Roger Robert Cotes | Sculpture | |
| Peter Courthope | Interment | |
| William Cunningham | Brass | |
| Henry Hallett Dale | Brass | |
| William Cecil Dampier Dampier | Brass | |
| George Howard Darwin | Brass | |
| Harold Davenport | Brass | |
| John Davies | Sculpture | 1744–1817. Vice-Master; botanist. |
| Basil Denis Dennis-Jones | Sculpture | |
| Maurice Herbert Dobb | Brass | |
| Peter Paul Dobree | Sculpture | |
| William Drury | Interment | |
| James Duff Duff | Brass | |
| Patrick William Duff | Brass | |
| Frederick James Dykes | Brass | |
| Arthur Stanley Eddington | Brass | |
| Henry Outram Evennett | Brass | |
| Frederick Field | Brass | |
| Walter Morley Fletcher | Brass | |
| Michael Foster | Brass | 8 March 1836 – 29 January 1907. |
| Ralph Howard Fowler | Brass | |
| James George Frazer | Brass | |
| Otto Robert Frisch | Brass | |
| John Andrew Gallagher | Brass | |
| James Whitbread Lee Glaisher | Brass | |
| George Peabody Gooch | Brass | |
| Harry Chester Goodhart | Brass | |
| William Gostwycke | Interment | |
| Andrew Sydenham Farrar Gow | Brass | |
| Alan Gray | Brass | |
| Andrew Hacket | Interment | |
| James Lemprière Hammond | Brass | |
| Charles John Hamson | Brass | |
| Godfrey Harold Hardy | Brass | |
| Ernest Harrison | Brass | |
| Samuel Hawkes | Sculpture | |
| William(?) Herbert | Interment | Bachelor of Divinity and Fellow, 1657–15 November 1715. |
| David Arthur Gilbert Hinks | Brass | |
| Alan Lloyd Hodgkin | Brass | |
| Henry Arthur Hollond | Brass | |
| Francis Hooper | Sculpture | |
| Frederick Gowland Hopkins | Brass | |
| Fenton John Anthony Hort | Brass | |
| Alfred Edward Housman | Brass | |
| Thomas Percy Hudson | Brass | |
| Hugo McLeod Innes | Brass | |
| Henry Jackson | Brass | |
| Richard Claverhouse Jebb | Brass | |
| Francis John Henry Jenkinson | Brass | |
| Thomas Jones | Sculpture | by Joseph Nollekens. |
| Piotr Leonidovich Kapitza | Brass | |
| Alan Ker | Brass | |
| Charles William King | Brass | |
| Alexander Francis Kirkpatrick | Brass | |
| George Sidney Roberts Kitson Clark | Brass | |
| Arthur Harold John Knight | Brass | |
| James Lambert | Sculpture | in Vestry. Regius Professor of Greek. 7 March 1741 – 28 April 1823. |
| John Newport Langley | Brass | |
| Gaillard Thomas Lapsley | Brass | |
| Reginald Vere Laurence | Brass | |
| Ralph Alexander Leigh | Brass | |
| Gerald Ponsonby Lenox-Conyngham | Brass | |
| Joseph Barber Lightfoot | Brass | |
| Denis Dionysius | Interment | |
| John Edensor Littlewood | Brass | |
| Daniel Lock | Sculpture | by Roubillac, north wall of the Ante-Chapel. |
| Henry Richards Luard | Brass | |
| William Lynnet | Interment | |
| Thomas Babington Macaulay | Statue | by Woolner, 1868. |
| Charles Fox Maitland | Sculpture | |
| Frederick William Maitland | Brass | |
| Frederick Malkin | Sculpture | |
| Frederick George Mann | Brass | |
| William Lort Mansel | Interment | |
| Francis Martin | Brass | on south wall of the Ante-Chapel. 1802–1868. Senior Bursar; Vice-Master. |
| John McTaggart Ellis McTaggart | Brass | |
| Moore Meredith | Interment | |
| Hubert Stanley Middleton | Brass | |
| George Edward Moore | Brass | |
| Hugh Andrew Johnstone Munro | Brass | |
| Hugh Frank Newall | Brass | |
| Isaac Newton | Statue | by Roubillac, presented 1755. |
| Tressilian Charles Nicholas | Brass | |
| Reynold Alleyne Nicholson | Brass | |
| John North | Interment | |
| Charles William Oatley | Brass | |
| Carl Frederick Abel Pantin | Brass | |
| Reginald St John Parry | Brass | |
| Alfred Chilton Pearson | Brass | |
| Richard Porson | Sculpture | |
| Richard Porson | Interment | |
| John Percival Postgate | Brass | |
| Joseph Prior | Brass | |
| Mark Gillachrist Marlborough Pryor | Brass | |
| Srinavasa Ramanujan | Brass | |
| Robert Mantle Rattenbury | Brass | |
| Dennis Holme Robertson | Brass | |
| Donald Struan Robertson | Brass | |
| John Arthur Thomas Robinson | Brass | |
| Robert Robson | Brass | |
| Thomas Rotherham | Interment | |
| Francis John Worsley Roughton | Brass | |
| Walter William Rouse Ball | Brass | |
| William Albert Hugh Rushton | Brass | |
| Bertrand Russell | Brass | |
| Ernest Rutherford | Brass | |
| Martin Ryle | Brass | |
| Francis Henry Sandbach | Brass | |
| Thomas Secford | Interment | |
| Adam Sedgwick | Brass | |
| Adam Sedgwick | Interment | |
| Thomas Kynaston Selwyn | Sculpture | |
| Richard Sheepshanks | Sculpture | |
| Henry Sidgwick | Brass | |
| Frederick Arthur Simpson | Brass | |
| Elizmar Smith | Brass | |
| Robert Smith | Interment | |
| Thomas Smith | Interment | Senior Fellow and Vice-Master. Vicar of Chesterton. 1658–1714. |
| James Spedding | Sculpture | |
| Piero Sraffa | Brass | |
| Charles Villiers Stanford | Brass | |
| Vincent Henry Stanton | Brass | |
| Richard Stevenson | Sculpture | by William Grinsell Nicholl on the south wall of the Ante-Chapel.19 October 1811 – 28 September 1837. |
| Hugo Fraser Stewart | Brass | |
| James Stuart | Brass | |
| Geoffrey Ingram Taylor | Brass | |
| Henry Martyn Taylor | Brass | |
| Sedley Taylor | Brass | |
| Frederick Robert Tennant | Brass | |
| Alfred, Lord Tennyson | Statue | |
| Arthur Thacker | Interment | |
| William Hepworth Thompson | Brass | |
| William Hepworth Thompson | Interment | |
| Joseph John Thomson | Brass | |
| Thomas Thorp | Brass | |
| George Macaulay Trevelyan | Brass | |
| Coutts Trotter | Brass | |
| Walter Ullmann | Brass | |
| Ralph Vaughan Williams | Brass | |
| Arthur Woollgar Verrall | Brass | |
| John Michal Kenneth Vyvyan | Brass | |
| Thomas Attwood Walmisley | Brass | |
| Edward Walpole | Interment | |
| James Ward | Brass | |
| Brooke Foss Westcott | Brass | |
| William Whewell | Statue | by Woolner, 1872. |
| William Whewell | Interment | |
| Stephen Whisson | Interment | |
| Alfred North Whitehead | Brass | |
| John Willis Clark | Brass | |
| John Wilson | Interment | in Ante-Chapel. Fellow; Tutor; Senior Bursar. Vicar of Over and Chesterton. d. 26 October 1754. |
| Denys Arthur Winstanley | Brass | |
| Carl Winter | Brass | |
| Arthur John Terence Dibben Wisdom | Brass | |
| Ludwig Wittgenstein | Brass | |
| John Wordsworth | Sculpture | |
| John Wordsworth | Interment | |
| William Aldis Wright | Brass | |

== Bibliography ==
- Willis, Robert (1886). Clark, John Willis (ed.). The Architectural History of the University of Cambridge, and of the Colleges of Cambridge and Eton. Vol. 2. University Press. pp. 469–472, 561–602.
