= Elisabeth Guppy =

British spiritualist medium

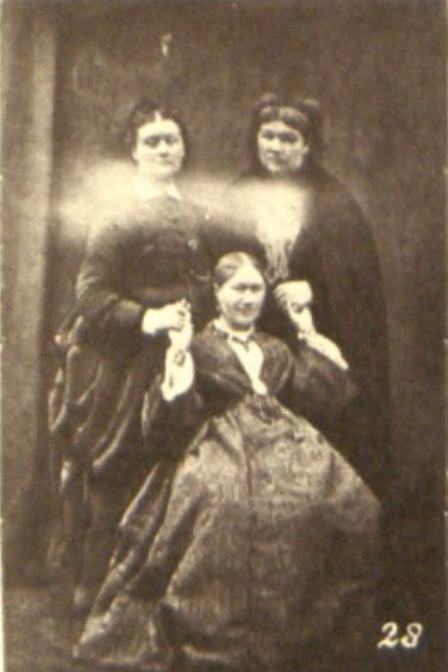
Mrs Tebb (left), Georgiana Houghton (middle), Agnes Guppy-Volckman (right).

Agnes Elisabeth Guppy-Volckman (née White; 1838–1917) was a British spiritualist medium.

== Career ==
She was born Agnes Elisabeth White in Horncastle, Lincolnshire not in Regent's Park, London. She was known as Agnes Nicholl when she became an orphan and she was adopted by her maternal grandfather William Grinsell Nicholl.

She became the wife of the spiritualist Samuel Guppy in 1867. After the death of Guppy in 1875, she married William Volckman.

Guppy was discovered by Fanny Sims who was the sister of Alfred Russel Wallace in the 1860s. Sims believed she had powers and she gave her first demonstration in 1866 at the Wallace's home.

Guppy was associated with the fraudulent spirit photographer Frederick Hudson. She was known for producing apports and materializations. Researcher Ronald Pearsall described the fraudulent techniques that Guppy used in her séances.

John Grant has written that she "was a clever charlatan; her stunts bear all the hallmarks of extravagant stage conjuring tricks."

Molly Whittington-Egan has written a biography of Guppy titled Mrs Guppy Takes A Flight: A Scandal of Victorian Spiritualism.

== Family ==
In the 1861 census she was living at 57 Teddington Low Road, Hampton Wick, with William Grinsell Nicholl. He was married, a sculptor aged 64, she was Elizabeth White aged 23 and she was Nicholl's granddaughter (and adopted daughter).

On 19 October 1865 she underwent an adult baptism at St Giles in the Fields church, Holborn, giving her first names as Elizabeth Clara White and surname as Nicholl and claiming William Grinsell Nicholl and his wife Emma as her parents. She gave her (correct) date of birth as 22 October 1838, and her address as 29 Great Norfolk Street (near the British Museum).

On December 10, 1867, she married Samuel Guppy at St Luke's church, Chelsea giving her name as Elizabeth White, a spinster, and her father as Charles Taylor White, deceased.

On 1 December 1871 she witnessed the will of William Grinsell Nicholl seven days before his death and while he was still living with his wife of 50 years.

== Alleged levitation ==
On 3 June 1871 it was alleged that Guppy had levitated out of her own house in Highbury three miles away to a séance room table in Lamb's Conduit Street. Although this incident was considered genuine by spiritualists such as Arthur Conan Doyle and A. Campbell Holms, it was dismissed by sceptics as a hoax.
