= John Hinchliffe =

English churchman and college fellow (1731–1794)

The Right Reverend John Hinchliffe
- Bishop of Peterborough
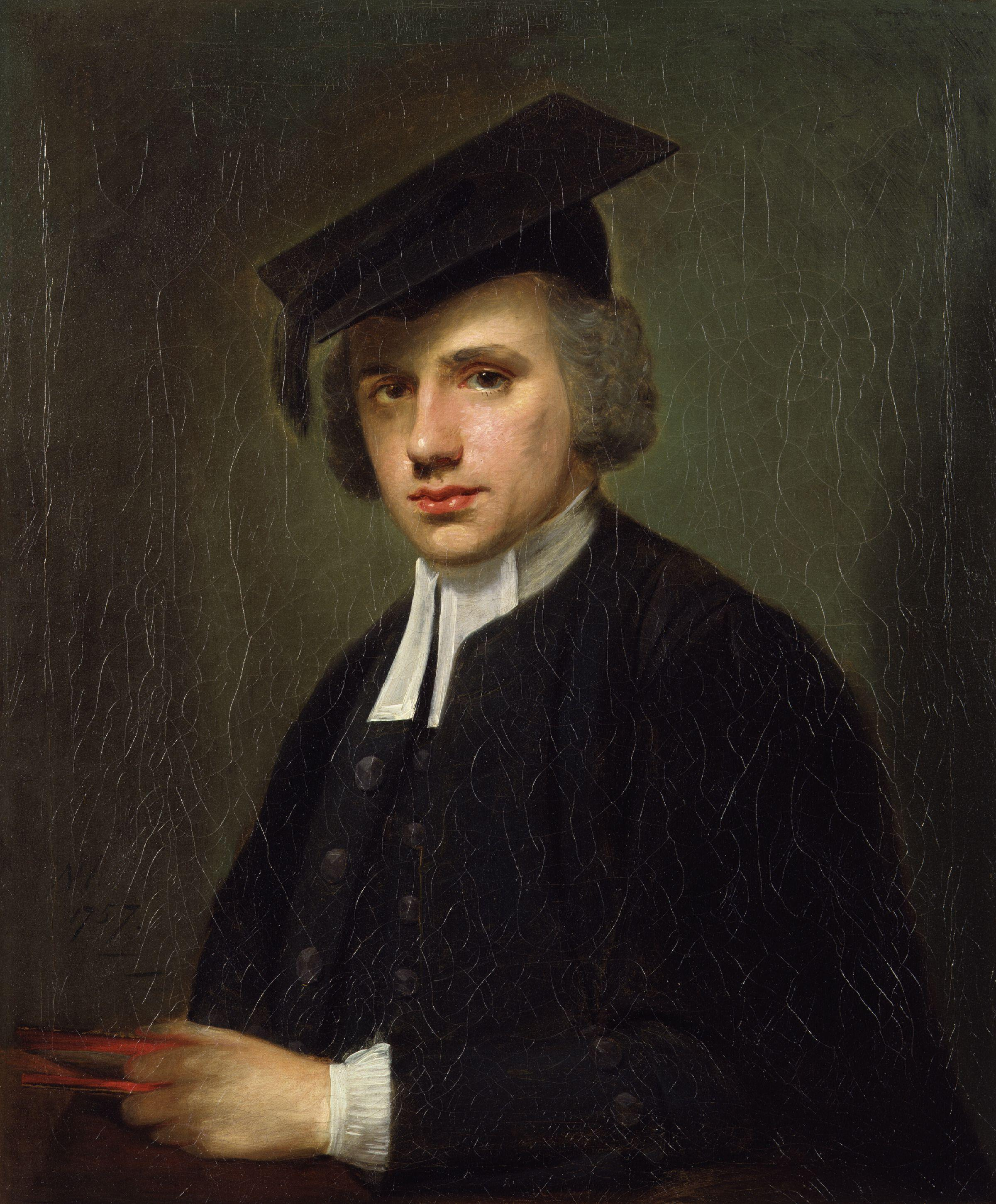
- Portrait of Hinchliffe by Nathaniel Hone the Elder, 1757
- Diocese: Diocese of Peterborough
- In office: 1769–1794
- Predecessor: Robert Lamb
- Successor: Spencer Madan
- Other post: Dean of Durham (1789–1794)

Personal details
- Born: 1731 Westminster, London
- Died: 11 January 1794 The Palace, Peterborough
- Buried: Peterborough Cathedral
- Denomination: Anglican
- Residence: The Palace, Peterborough
- Parents: Joseph Hinchliffe
- Spouse: Elizabeth Crewe
- Children: 5
- Education: Trinity College, Cambridge

John Hinchliffe (1731 – 11 January 1794) was an English churchman and college fellow who was Master of Trinity College, Cambridge, 1768–88, Vice-Chancellor of the University of Cambridge, 1768–9, Chaplain to George III, 1768, Bishop of Peterborough, 1769–94, and Dean of Durham, 1788–94.

== Early life ==
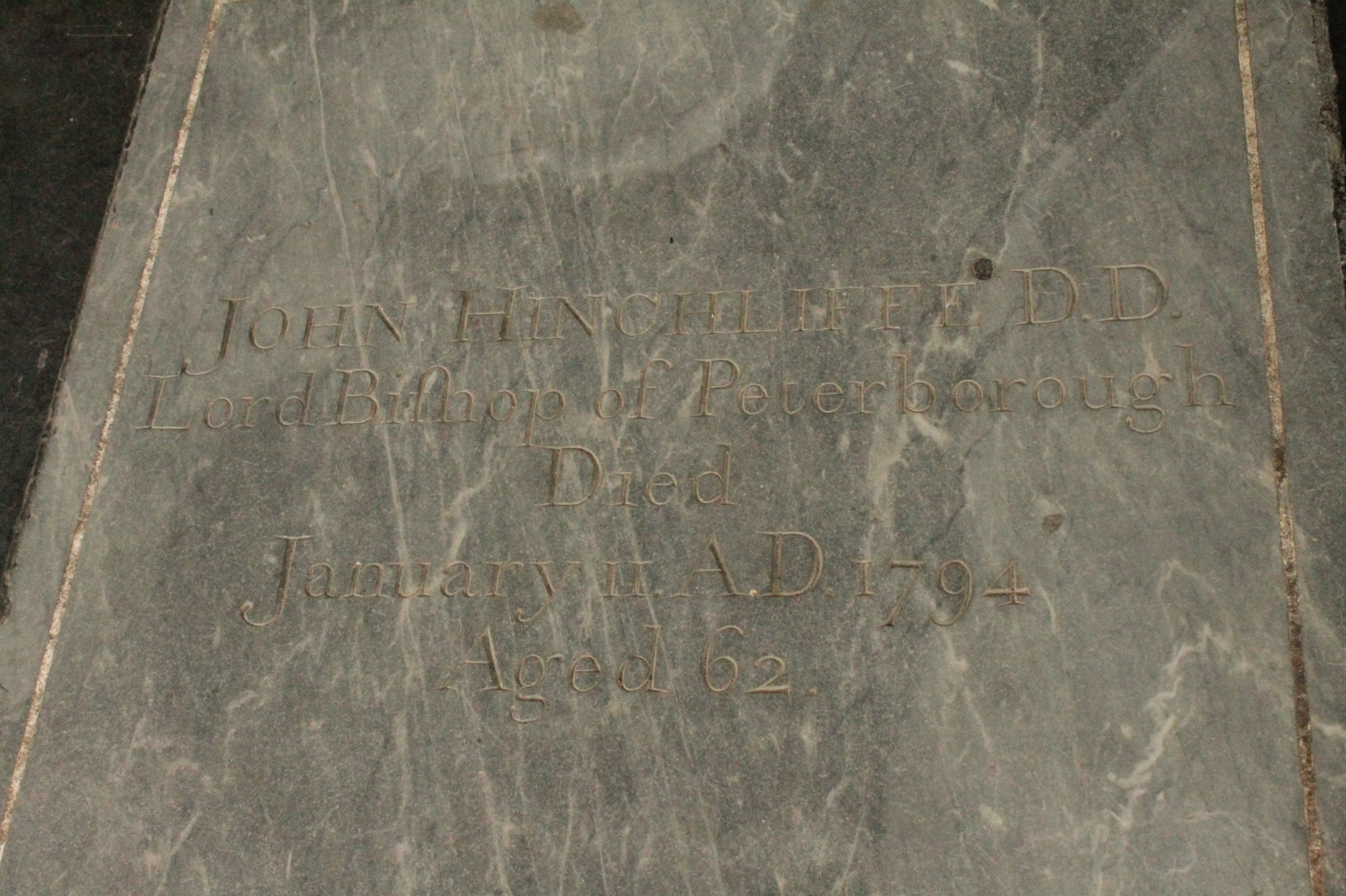
The grave of John Hinchliffe in Peterborough Cathedral

Hinchliffe was the son of Joseph Hinchliffe of London. He was educated at Westminster School and then studied Theology at Trinity College, Cambridge, where he was admitted as a pensioner (aged 18) on 14 June 1750. He graduated BA in 1754, M.A. in 1757, became a fellow in 1755, and was awarded a Doctorate in Divinity (D.D.) in 1764.

== Career ==
Hinchliffe was ordained as a deacon on 28 December 1756, and as a priest on 19 May 1757, both by Matthias Mawson, Bishop of Ely, at Kensington Parish Church. Chaplain to Elizabeth Hobart, Countess of Buckinghamshire from 1757 to 1762, he was an assistant master at Westminster School from 1757 to 1764, he acted as headmaster for three months in 1764 before becoming tutor to William Cavendish, 5th Duke of Devonshire from 1764 to 1766. He was Domestic Chaplain to Spencer Compton, 8th Earl of Northampton from 1763 to 1773 and also to Frederick Cornwallis (who was Bishop of Lichfield until 1768 and Archbishop of Canterbury from 1768) from 1768 until 1781. Vicar of Greenwich from 1766 to 1769, Hinchliffe was briefly Vice-Chancellor of the University of Cambridge from 1768 to 1769, was made a Chaplain to George III in 1768, and appointed Master of Trinity College in the same year. In 1769 he was made Bishop of Peterborough. As bishop he played an active role in the House of Lords over the war with America. In 1788 he resigned the Mastership of Trinity College. From 1789 until his death, Hinchliffe was Dean of Durham.

Hinchliffe died in the Bishop's Palace, Peterborough in January 1794 and is buried in Peterborough Cathedral. The grave lies in a group of floor stones dedicated to bishops towards the east end.

== Family ==
Hinchliffe married Elizabeth Crewe, daughter of John Crewe of Crewe Hall, Cheshire, and sister of John Crewe, later 1st Baron Crewe. They had two sons and three daughters.

== Bibliography ==
- Hinchliffe, J. (1770). A sermon preached by order of her imperial majesty on the tomb of Peter the Great in the cathedral church of St. Petersbourg.
- Caudle, J. J. (2004). "John Hinchliffe". Oxford Dictionary of National Biography (online ed.). Oxford University Press. doi:10.1093/ref:odnb/13333. (Subscription, Wikipedia Library access or UK public library membership required.)

Church of England titles
Preceded by Robert Lamb	Bishop of Peterborough; 1769–1794	Succeeded by Spencer Madan
Preceded by William Digby	Dean of Durham; 1789–1794	Succeeded by James Cornwallis
Academic offices
Preceded by Robert Smith	Master of Trinity College, Cambridge; 1768–1789	Succeeded by Thomas Postlethwaite
Preceded by Sir James Marriott	Vice-Chancellor of the University of Cambridge; 1768–1769	Succeeded by William Richardson
Preceded by William Markham	Master of Westminster School; 1764	Succeeded by Samuel Smith
