= Georgiana Houghton =

British artist and spiritualist medium

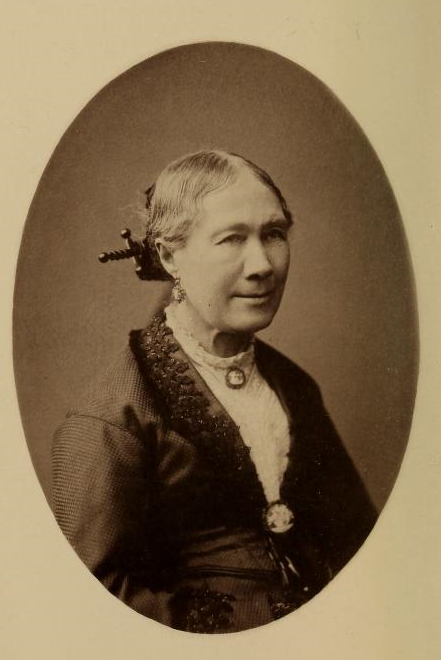
Georgiana Houghton

Georgiana Houghton (1814–March 1884) was a British artist and spiritualist medium.

== Biography ==
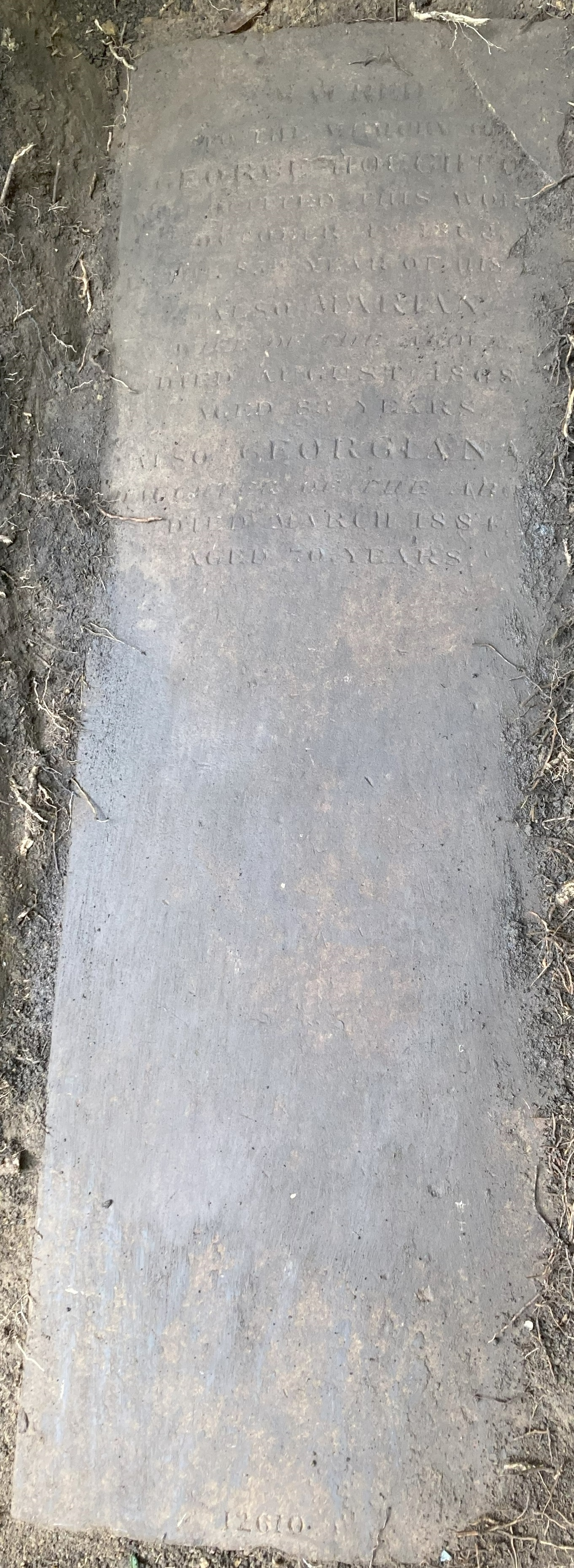
Grave of Georgiana Houghton in Highgate Cemetery

Houghton was born in 1814 in Las Palmas, on Spain's Canary Islands, but later moved to London. She produced her first abstract works, then referred to as 'spirit' drawings, in 1859 at private séances. She exhibited a collection of abstract watercolour drawings to the public at an exhibition at the New British Gallery in Bond Street, London in 1871.

Houghton became associated with the spirit photographer Frederick Hudson to sell reproductions of his photographs.

In 1882, Houghton published Chronicles of the Photographs of Spiritual Beings and Phenomena Invisible to the Material Eye. The book included alleged spirit photographs from Hudson and other photographers featuring mediums such as Agnes Guppy-Volckman, Stainton Moses and spiritualists Alfred Russel Wallace and William Howitt. The photographs in the book were criticized by magic historian Albert A. Hopkins. He noted that the photographs looked dubious and that such images could be produced by fraudulent methods.

Houghton lived most of her adult life with her parents in Kentish Town in north London, where her siblings and their families also made their homes, and which was still a small village on the edge of the city in the mid-19th century. After her father's death she moved to Paddington in west London, where she died in March 1884 and she was buried along with other family members on the western side of Highgate Cemetery. Her grave (no.12610) was recorded in the Cemetery register, but its exact whereabouts was unknown until it was found in July 2023.

== Artistic career ==
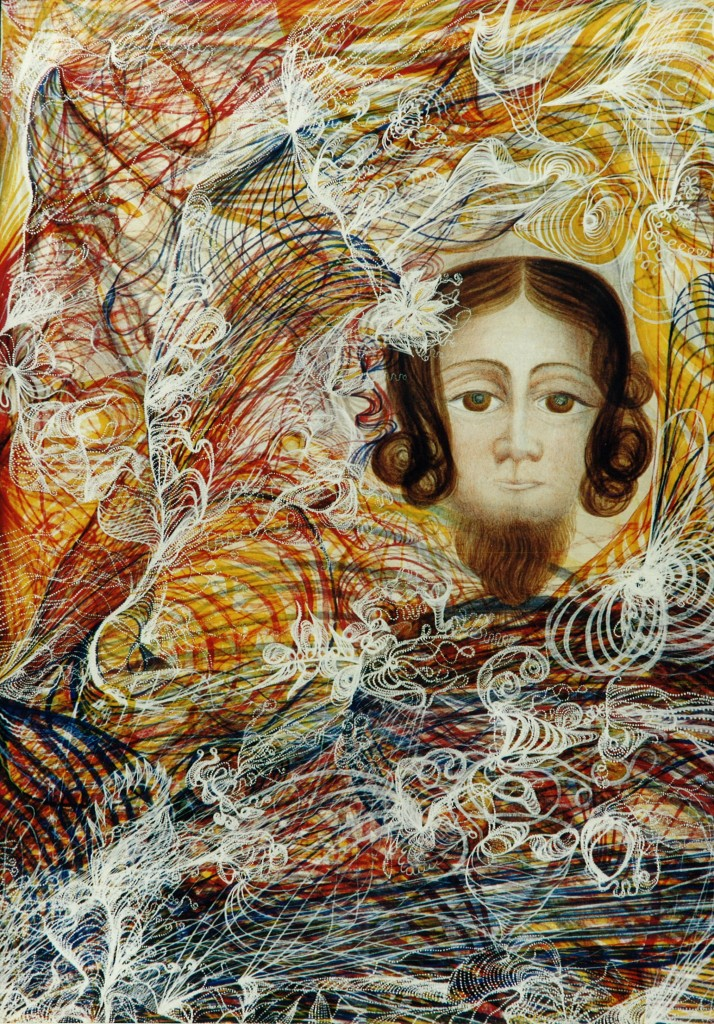
The Portrait of the Lord Jesus Christ

Georgiana Houghton started creating her spirit images first by drawing and eventually started experimenting with watercolors. Her paintings were produced by an automatic process, which she described as occurring under the direction of spirits. This technique would be revisited by Austin Osman Spare in 1913, by the Swedish artist Hilma af Klint from 1896 and, from about 1919, by the surrealists. Her earliest known works depicted extremely stylized flowers and fruits. Following a period of formal experimentation, Houghton developed a completely abstract or non-objective style, at least 40 years before Kandinsky, Malevich, František Kupka and Piet Mondrian – all of whom were in some measure inspired by spiritual themes. (Current debate on the question of gender bias in the traditional history of modern abstraction increasingly centers on the persistent neglect of Houghton's achievement, particularly in view of the link to spiritualism which her art shares with that of these and other later male pioneers of abstraction.) By the late 1860s, Houghton's abstractions correlated with the supernatural nature of her subjects. She did not depict objects of the natural world but what she described as a spiritual experience. To her, art was a way to make contact with God. As her production continued, Houghton's images gained in complexity, exhibiting an increasing number of layers, colors and small details. In the 19th century, “abstraction” was not yet a concept, hence the bemused tone of the critical reception of the paintings. Houghton described the apparently non-referential shapes and colors in her paintings as a system of “sacred symbolism," in which each formal element carried a unique meaning.

== Exhibitions ==
In 1871, Houghton organized and privately subsidized a public exhibition “Spirit Drawings in Water Colours” of 155 of her watercolours at the New British Library in London. In April 2015, Monash University organized the exhibition “Believe not every spirit, but try the spirits” in which 25 of Houghton's watercolours were displayed. In June 2016, the Courtauld Institute of Art created a somewhat more comprehensive exhibition dedicated to the artist: “Georgiana Hougton: Spirit Drawings”. In November 2018, 17 paintings were displayed as part of "World Receivers" exhibition along with Hilma af Klint and Emma Kunz, then six were exhibited at Wilhelm Hack Museum's "Floral Fantasies" exhibition in March 2019. In 2021, as part of Centre Pompidou's "Women in Abstraction" exhibition, then this exhibition was presented at the Guggenheim Museum Bilbao in late 2021/early 2022, Both these exhibitions were in a virtual platform due to the pandemic. In 2022, her work was included in the thematic exhibit Corps orbite for the 59th Venice Biennale. The Victorian Spiritualists' Union, in Melbourne, Victoria, Australia have 35 of Houghton's original paintings permanently on display, and regularly loan the collections for exhibiting around the world. In 2020, the VSU published a book on Houghton's works

== Publications ==
- Chronicles of the Photographs of Spiritual Beings and Phenomena Invisible to the Material Eye (1882)
- Evenings at Home in Spiritual Séance (1882)
