= Harry Williams (priest) =

Member of Community of the Resurrection (CR)

The Reverend Fr Harry Williams CR
- Dean of Trinity College Chapel
- Church: Church of England
- In office: 1958 to 1969
- Other posts: Chaplain of Westcott House, Cambridge (1948 to 1951); Monk of the Community of the Resurrection (1972 to 2006 (his death))

Orders
- Ordination: 1943 (deacon); 1944 (priest)

Personal details
- Born: Harry Abbott Williams; 10 May 1919 Rochester, Kent, England
- Died: 30 January 2006 (aged 86)
- Denomination: Anglicanism
- Education: Cranleigh School
- Alma mater: Trinity College, Cambridge; Cuddesdon College

Harry Abbott Williams CR (10 May 1919 – 30 January 2006) was a British Church of England priest, monk, theologian and academic. After serving two curacies, he was chaplain of Westcott House, Cambridge. He then moved to Trinity College, Cambridge, where he was a fellow and lecturer and was later Dean of Trinity College Chapel. In 1972, he left academia and entered religious life as a monk with the Community of the Resurrection.

== Early life ==
Williams was born on 10 May 1919 in Rochester, Kent, England. His father was a captain in the Royal Navy who had to retire early because he could not secure the required promotion in order to remain in the navy until retirement age. His mother fell in love with a neighbour's son who was much younger than herself. Though it may not have been consummated, the affair led to tensions within the family. Eventually, the guilt experienced by Williams' mother led her to become an evangelical fundamentalist. She was described by her son as a "keen Christian out and out for Jesus".

Williams was educated at Cranleigh School, a private school in Cranleigh, Surrey. It was during his time at Cranleigh that he was drawn to high church Anglicanism. He won a scholarship to study theology at Trinity College, Cambridge. He graduated in 1941 with a first class honours Bachelor of Arts (BA) degree; as per tradition, his BA degree was promoted to a Master of Arts (MA (Cantab)) degree.

His bad eyesight meant that he was not found fit to be called up for military service during World War II. He had been found fit for home duties but the British Government had granted permission for ordinands to continue their training. Therefore, he was able to continue his studies without serving in the military. In 1941, he entered Cuddesdon College, an Anglican theological college, to train for the priesthood. He undertook two years of formation before being ordained in 1943.

== Ordained ministry ==
Williams was ordained in the Church of England as a deacon in 1943 and as a priest in 1944. He served two curacies in the Diocese of London. From 1943 to 1945, he was a curate at St Barnabas', Pimlico. From 1945 to 1948, he was a curate at All Saints, Margaret Street, an Anglo-Catholic church.

In 1948, Williams returned to Cambridge to join the staff of Westcott House, a Liberal Anglo-Catholic theological college. The principal, Kenneth Carey, was a Liberal Christian and had sought out someone from the Anglo-Catholic tradition to even-out the leadership. From 1948 to 1951, he served as the college chaplain and as a tutor in the New Testament.

In 1951, Williams was elected a fellow of his alma mater, Trinity College, Cambridge. He left Westcott and joined Trinity as a lecturer in the New Testament. It was during his time at Trinity that he had a nervous breakdown which for a considerable length of time rendered it impossible for him to function as a priest, though the college supported him. He underwent psychoanalysis, which would alter profoundly his understanding of himself and his faith. Appointed Dean of Trinity College Chapel in 1958, at a time when he still found officiating difficult, he gradually regained his confidence and continued in post for eleven years.

It was during that period that Williams became known as one of the most accessible and challenging theologians of the day. He contributed an article on Christianity and psychology to Alec Vidler's symposium Soundings - Essays Concerning Christian Understanding, and in 1965 published The True Wilderness, a series of sermons exploring Christianity from a psychological perspective which examined the influence of personality on faith. After his death, the Church Times summed up this period in his career as follows:

"He began to feel, and say, that "religion" should be exposed as the enemy of humanity and that the God he had worshipped was more rightly hated as a sadistic monster, the Devil; and his despair resulted in a physical collapse as he felt totally isolated. Then for 14 years he was kept sane, and encouraged to be himself, by a therapist without any professed religion, Christopher Scott. When Harry Williams wrote True Resurrection (in 1972, and again based on sermons), that was the deliverance which he celebrated and advocated."

Williams is also remembered for a controversial appearance on the seminal 1960s BBC religious programme Meeting Point on which he suggested that the resurrection of Christ could be interpreted as a metaphor, and for being one of the first Anglican priests to be open about his homosexuality, as his candid autobiography, Some Day I'll Find You, shows.

In 1969, at the age of 50, he made a life-changing decision and entered the Community of the Resurrection. It had been thought that one day he would be made a bishop, but his earlier breakdown and now his entering religious life, ended any possibility of entering the episcopate. After more than two years as a postulant, he took his religious vows and officially became a monk on 1 January 1972.

In 1978 he was invited by the Headmaster of Westminster School to make a Lenten address, in the course of which he described Jesus as a "super God-filled man" and brushed off the Resurrection as a metaphor. This provoked one boy, the future Revd Christopher Loveless, to storm out.

Having been the Dean of Trinity College when Prince Charles studied there, he was invited to the wedding of Charles and Diana in 1981. Williams composed and read one of the prayers used in the service.

While a monk, Williams continued to write theological books that became bestsellers and also an autobiography. He published nothing in the last 24 years of his life, but an unpublished typescript and other unpublished works were found in his room after his death. These were published posthumously as Living Free.

Williams remained living with the community until his death on 30 January 2006. On 13 May, a memorial service was held at Trinity College, Cambridge.

== Personal life ==
Williams was homosexual and was one of the first Anglican priests to come out. He had a number of casual sexual relationships with men, as well as at least two long-term same-sex relationships.

While a fellow of Trinity College, Cambridge, Williams fell in love with a male colleague and could not mentally process that his religion considered this to be a grave sin. It was also at this time that he concluded from his studies of the New Testament that very little could be known about the historical Jesus. This personal and religious crisis caused a breakdown and he avoided church for 18 months. He could only return to his career and faith with the help of a non-religious therapist. They continued to meet together for the next 14 years so that Williams could continue to undergo psychotherapy and receive the support of his therapist.

== Selected works ==
- Williams, H. A. (1951). Jesus and the Resurrection. London: Longmans.
- Williams, H. A. (1960). God's Wisdom in Christ's Cross. London: Mowbray.
- Williams, H. A. (1960). The Four Last Things. London: Mowbray.
- Williams, H. A. (1965). The True Wilderness. London: Constable.
- Williams, H. A. (1972). True Resurrection. London: Michael Beazley.
- Williams, H. A. (1975). Poverty, Chastity and Obedience: the True Virtues. London: Michael Beazley.
- Williams, H. A. (1975). True Christianity: the Oxford-Cambridge Lectures. Springfield, Il.: Templegate Publishers.
- Williams, H. A. (1976). Tensions: Necessary Conflicts in Life and Love. London: Michael Beazley.
- Williams, H. A. (1977). Becoming What I Am: a Discussion of the Methods and Results of Christian Prayer. London: Darton, Longman and Todd. ISBN 9780232513622.
- Williams, H. A. (1979). The Joy of God. London: Michael Beazley.
- Williams, H. A. (1979). The Gay Christian Movement and the Education of Public Opinion. London: Gay Christian Movement.
- Williams, H. A. (1982). Someday I'll Find You: an Autobiography. London: Michael Beazley.
- Williams, H. A. (1984). True to Experience: an Anthology of the Words and Teaching of H.A. Williams. London: Michael Beazley.
- Williams, H. A. (2006). Living Free. London: Continuum.
