= Israel Lyons =

Israel Lyons the Younger
- Born: 1739; Cambridge, England
- Died: 1 May 1775 (aged 36); London, England
- Education: Trinity College, Cambridge
- Known for: Treatise of Fluxions
- Scientific career
- Fields: Mathematician and botanist
- Workplaces: University of Oxford
- Academic advisors: Robert Smith

Israel Lyons the Younger (1739 – 1 May 1775) was a mathematician and botanist. He was born in Cambridge, the son of Israel Lyons the elder (died 1770). He was regarded as a prodigy, especially in mathematics, and Robert Smith, master of Trinity College, took him under his wing and paid for his attendance.

== Biography ==
He was the son of Israel Lyons the elder, a teacher of Hebrew in the University of Cambridge, who wrote a Hebrew Grammar together with the Rev. Richard Grey, D. D., rector of Hinton in Northamptonshire, in 1763.

Due to his Ashkenazi Jewish origins, Lyons was not permitted to become an official member of the University of Cambridge. Nevertheless, his brilliance resulted in his publication Treatise on Fluxions at the age of 19, and his enthusiasm for botany resulted in a published survey of Cambridge flora a few years later. An Oxford undergraduate, Joseph Banks, paid Lyons to deliver a series of botany lectures at the University of Oxford. Lyons was selected by the Astronomer Royal to compute astronomical tables for the Nautical Almanac. Later, Banks secured Lyons a position as the astronomer for the 1773 North Pole voyage led by Constantine Phipps.

Lyons married, in March 1774, Phoebe Pearson, daughter of Newman Pearson of Over, Cambridgeshire, and settled in Rathbone Place, London. There he died of measles on 1 May 1775, at the age of only 36, while preparing a complete edition of Edmond Halley's works sponsored by the Royal Society.

== See also ==
- European and American voyages of scientific exploration
