= Denys Winstanley =

Denys Arthur Winstanley (5 December 1877 – 20 March 1947) was a British historian and academic, Vice-Master of Trinity College, Cambridge.

Winstanley was born in Rugby, Warwickshire, and educated at Merchant Taylor's School, London. He graduated from Trinity College, Cambridge with first-class honours in history.

He began his career as a school inspector in Durham, England, but in 1906 he returned to Trinity College as a Fellow and lecturer. He remained there for the rest of his life, save for a short stint in World War I when he served as a military intelligence officer in Egypt. He was Tutor of Trinity College from 1919 and Senior Tutor from 1925 to 1931, serving as Vice-Master to Sir J.J. Thomson, who was Master until 1940.

Winstanley is the author of several books of history, including a four-volume history of Cambridge University spanning the years 1750 to 1882.

Winstanley died in 1947, age 69, and is buried in the Parish of the Ascension Burial Ground in Cambridge. He is commemorated in a brass memorial in Trinity College Chapel, Cambridge.

== Works by D.A. Winstanley ==
- Personal and Party Government (1910) at the Internet Archive
- Lord Chatham and the Whig Opposition (1912) at the Internet Archive
- The University of Cambridge in the Eighteenth Century (1922) at the Internet Archive
- Unreformed Cambridge (1935)
- Early Victorian Cambridge (1940)
- Later Victorian Cambridge (1947)
