= Walter Taylor (mathematician) =

- Born: c. 1700; Tuxford, Nottinghamshire, England
- Died: 23 February 1743/44 (aged 43–44)
- Education: Trinity College, Cambridge
- Scientific career
- Fields: Mathematician, classicist
- Workplaces: Trinity College, Cambridge
- Academic advisors: Robert Smith
- Notable students: Stephen Whisson

Walter Taylor (c. 1700 – 23 February 1743/44) was a Trinity College, Cambridge mathematics tutor who coached 83 students in the 1724–1743 period. He later was appointed as the Regius Professor of Greek.

He was the son of John Taylor, Vicar of Tuxford, Nottinghamshire. He matriculated in 1716 from Wakefield School, Yorkshire. Taylor was admitted as a pensioner at Trinity on 7 April 1716.

Robert Smith was Taylor's Cambridge tutor.

== Timeline ==
- 1717 Scholar
- 1719/20 BA
- 1723 MA
- 1736 BD
- 1722 Fellow of Trinity
- 1726–44 Regius Professor of Greek
- 1725 Ordained deacon
- 1726/7 Ordained priest
- 1743/4 buried at Tuxford
