= A. Campbell Holms =

Scottish shipbuilding expert and spiritualist

Archibald Campbell Holms (1861–1954) most well known as A. Campbell Holms was a Scottish shipbuilding expert and spiritualist.

== Career ==
Holms was the author of the book Practical Shipbuilding (1904). He also authored The Facts of Psychic Science (1925). It was described in the Encyclopedia Britannica as an "uncritical summary". The book was heavily criticized by Leonard Woolf as an amusing and credulous study. According to Woolf, the book blindly accepted psychic claims at face value and lacked critical thinking. It was reprinted in 1969 with a new foreword from Leslie Shepard.

According to a review of the book it is a "collection of all the dubious matter on which the cult and business of Spiritualism is based. The author believes in it himself, but there is little in the book which is likely to convince others. The "facts" are the usual narratives of wonders said to have occurred but which cannot be scientifically demonstrated."

Spiritualists have positively reviewed the book. According to the Arthur Conan Doyle "In Mr. Campbell Holms' book, The Facts of Psychic Science, which is, and will be always, a most exact and valuable book of reference, there are a number of cases given where people have been transported through solid objects." One of these cases was the 3 June 1871 incident which involved the alleged transportation of the medium Agnes Guppy-Volckman out of her own house in Highbury three miles away to a séance room table in Lamb's Conduit Street. Although this incident was considered genuine by Holms, it was dismissed by skeptics as a hoax.

Holms attributed alleged poltergeist cases to the effects of mischievous spirits.

== Publications ==
- Practical Shipbuilding (1904, 1917)
- The Facts of Psychic Science and Philosophy (1925, 1969)
- The Fundamental Facts of Spiritualism (1927)
