= William Grinsell Nicholl =

British sculptor

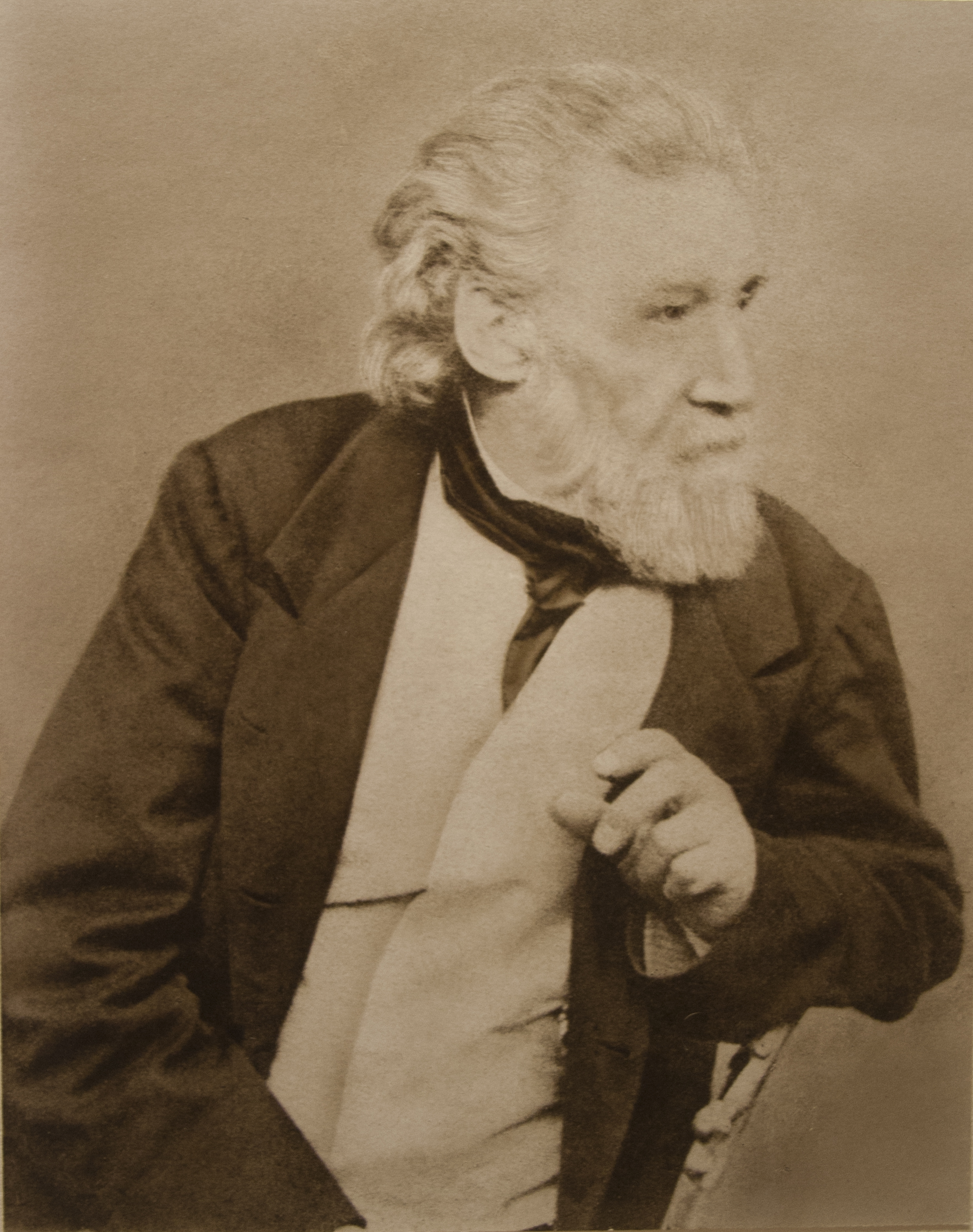
- William Grinsell Nicholl, mid 1860s, photographer unknown.
- Born: 4 November 1796; Pancras, London
- Died: 8 December 1871 (aged 75); Acton, London
- Education: Royal Academy
- Known for: Sculpture

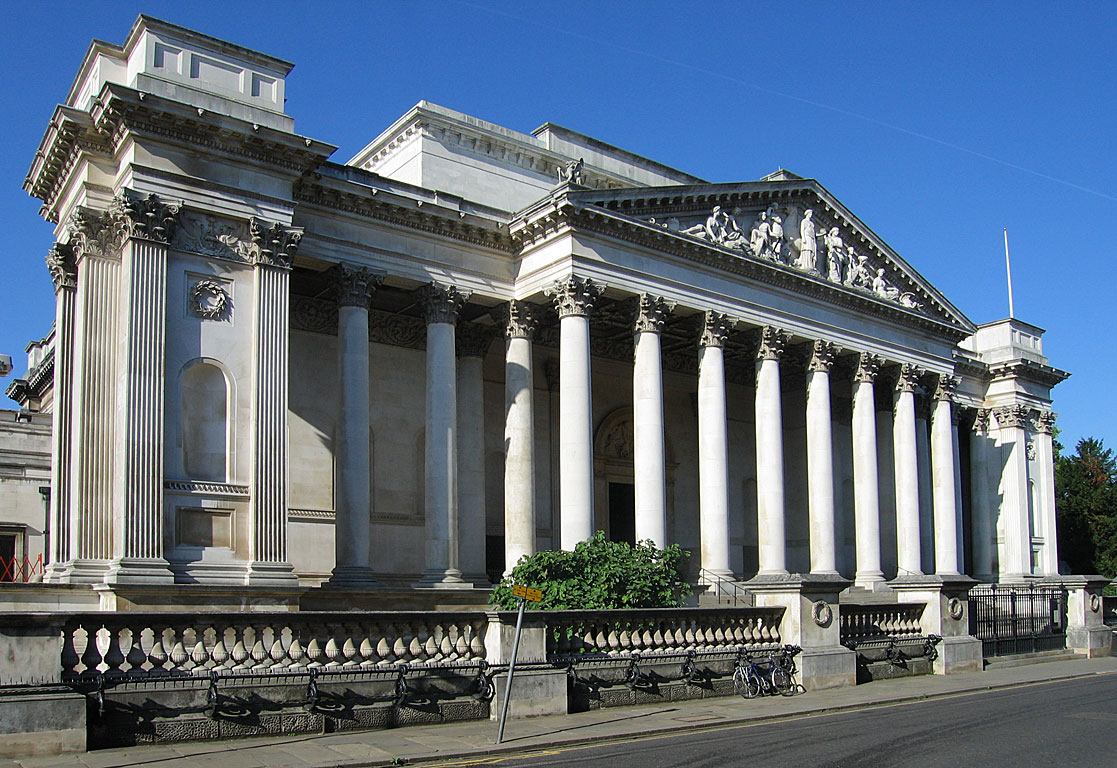
The Fitzwilliam Museum

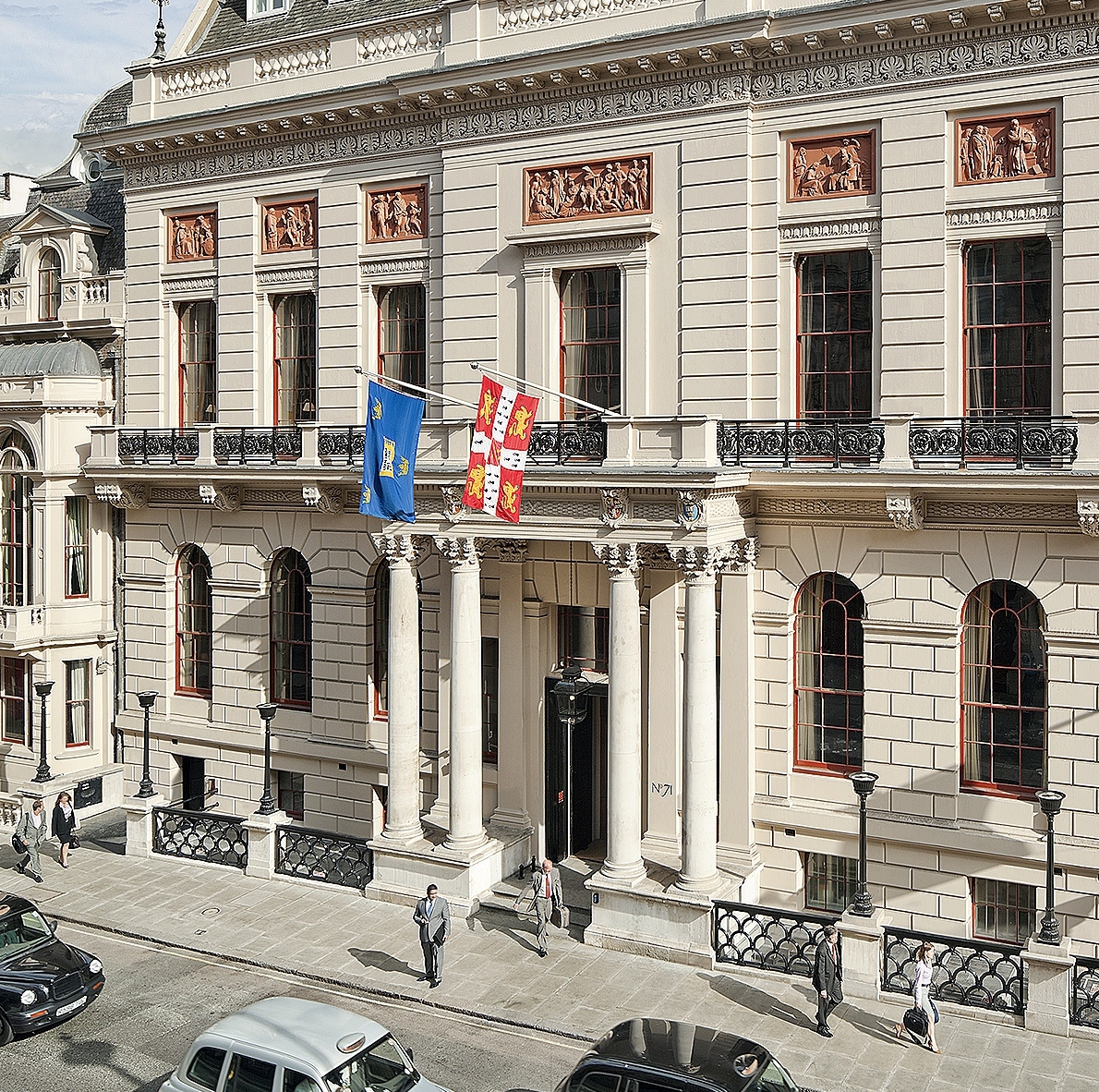
The Oxford and Cambridge Club

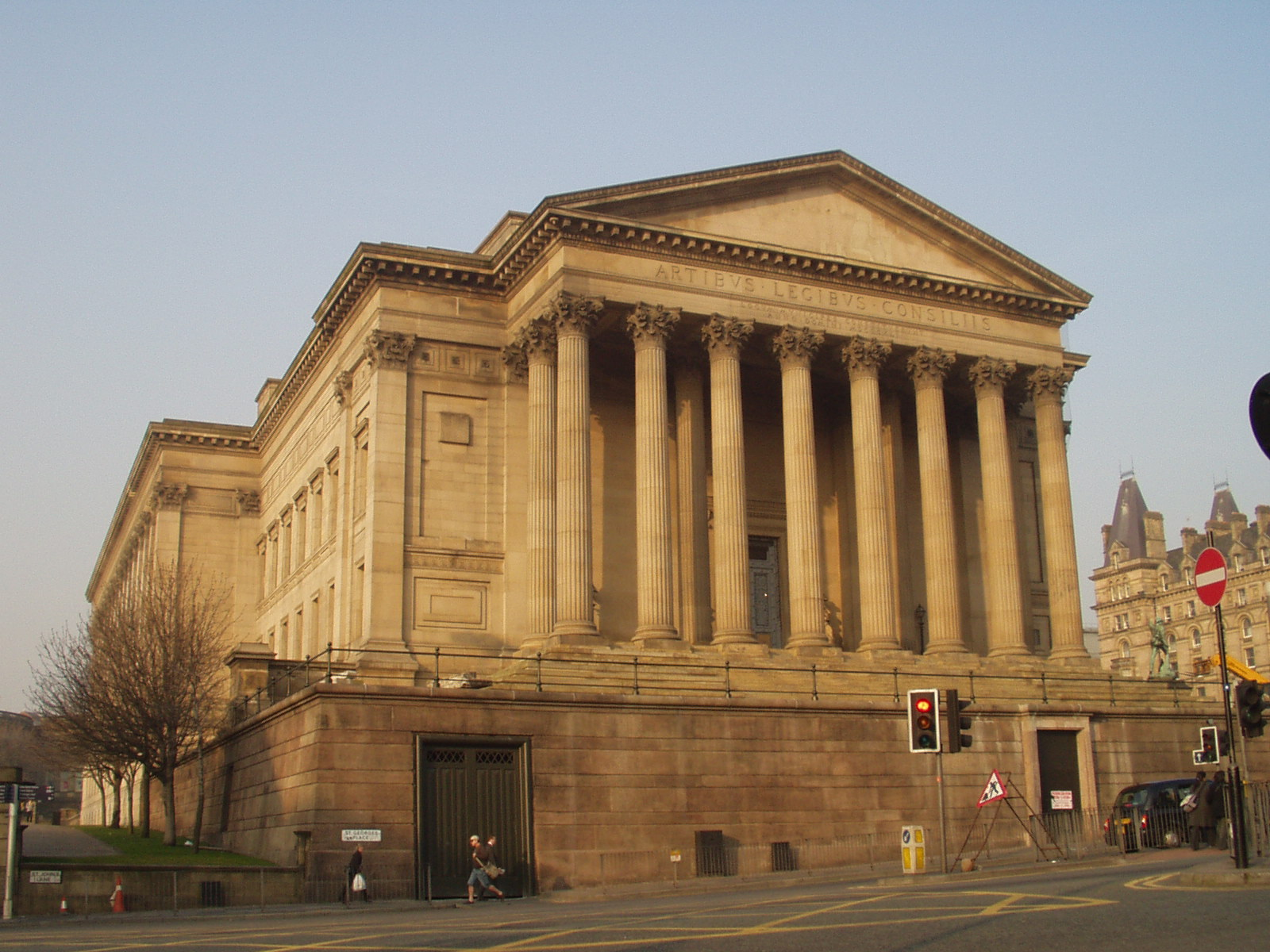
St Georges Hall, Liverpool, from the southwest

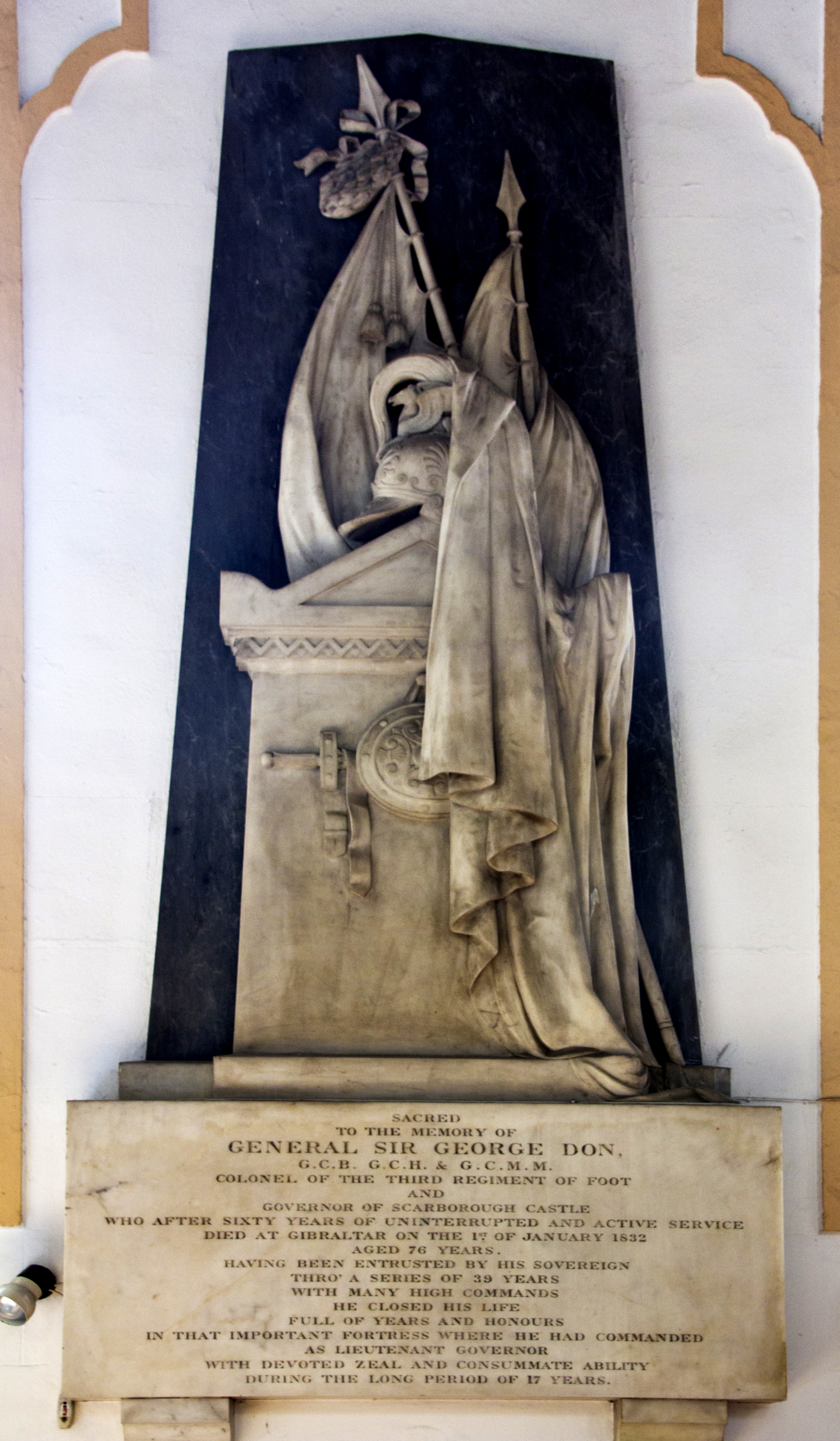
Sir George Don monument, Anglican Cathedral, Gibraltar

William Grinsell Nicholl (London 1796–1871) was a British 19th-century architectural and monumental sculptor.

== Life ==
He was born in Marylebone, London in 1796. In 1822 he attended the Royal Academy Schools.

He exhibited in the Royal Academy from 1822 to 1861 and was highly respected. His studio was on Grafton Street East - off Tottenham Court Road, London

The Oxford Dictionary of National Biography incorrectly states that in about 1849 he adopted his maternal grandchild, Elisabeth Nicholl who aged eleven had become an orphan. In time it was claimed that she had spititual powers.

Nicholl had 7 known children, the first born in 1821 and the last in 1843. Only the first two children (both female) married. In 1850 the family (except the first daughter) lived in Sydney, NSW, where he opened a sculpture gallery that proved to be unsuccessful and the family returned to London in 1854. Elizabeth White lived with Nicholl in the 1861 census at 57 Teddington Low Road, Teddington, Middlesex using her correct birth surname of White and describing herself as Nicholl's married daughter. Nicholl's wife and unmarried children were living in Camden, London. On 19 October 1865 an Elizabeth Clara White born 22 January 1838 underwent an adult baptism at St Giles in the Fields, London, giving her parents names as William Grinsell & Elizabeth and the family name Nicholl. Elizabeth White married, using her correct name, a wealthy man called Guppy and witnessed the will of William Grinsell Nicholl one week before he died in the family home in Churchfield Road, Acton, west London on 8 December 1871.

== Architectural works ==
- Pediment London Customs House (1827) - entablature as part of rebuilding after partial collapse. Destroyed in Blitz.
- Portico and columns of the Fitzwilliam Museum, Cambridge (1830-1837) - under George Basevi and designed by Charles Lock Eastlake.
- Bas-reliefs over windows at the Oxford and Cambridge Club in London (1838) - under Sir Robert Smirke.
- Four lions at foot of stairs, Fitzwilliam Museum (1839).
- Pediment of the Taylor Institute in Oxford (1846)- under George Basevi and later Charles Robert Cockerell
- Pediment and columns of St George's Hall, Liverpool (1850) - under Charles Robert Cockerell.
- Four lions at St George's Hall, Liverpool (1855)
- Reredos at Waltham Abbey Church (1862) under William Burges.
- Lectern, two large candlesticks and two statues in Worcester College Chapel, Oxford University (1866) under William Burges.

== Other works ==
- Bust of Henry Sass (1820) -possibly as Nicholl's tutor
- Bust of George III (c.1822) copy of Jubilee Bust by Peter Turnerelli
- Bust of John Law, Archdeacon of Rochester (1827), Chatham Parish Church
- Bust of Philip Rundell (1827) now in Victoria and Albert Museum
- Monument to Sir John Hippisley (1825) Temple Church, Inner Temple, London. Destroyed in the Blitz.
- Monument to Bishop Jacob Mountain (died June 1825), Cathedral of the Holy Trinity, Québec City, Canada (signed W.G. Nicholl).
- Monument to John Frewen-Turner (1829) Cold Overton, Leicestershire
- Monument to Henry Wootton (1830) at Minster, Kent
- Monument to Sir George Don (1832) in Garrison Church, Gibraltar (now the Anglican Cathedral). Designed by George Basevi.
- Monument to Joseph Bonsor(1835) Great Bookham parish church, Surrey
- Monument to Elizabeth Morley (1837) Walthamstow Parish Church
- Monument to Richard Stevenson (1837) Trinity College Chapel, Cambridge
- Statue of Captain Cook (1844) Royal Academy
- Monument to Rev J. Murray (1862) St Andrews Church, Wells Street, London. The church was demolished and rebuilt in 1933–4 as St Andrew’s, Kingsbury.
- Medallions, bas relief carvings and architectural details in the Octagon room of the Garden Pavilion in the Grounds of Buckingham Palace (1846). Pavillion removed (1928)
- Statues of Lord Cornwallis and Lord Clive at the India Office, London. (1867)

== Family ==
He married Emma Elizabeth Nicholson in Paddington, London, on 17 April 1821. Between 1851 and 1854 they lived with most of their children in Sydney, Australia. Nicholl's second daughter, Charlotte Anne (1824-1905), married John Russell an iron founder, 17 February 1855 in St James Church, Sydney and their son John Peter Russell, the Australian impressionist painter, was born in 1858.
