= Thomas Postlethwaite =

English clergyman and mathematician

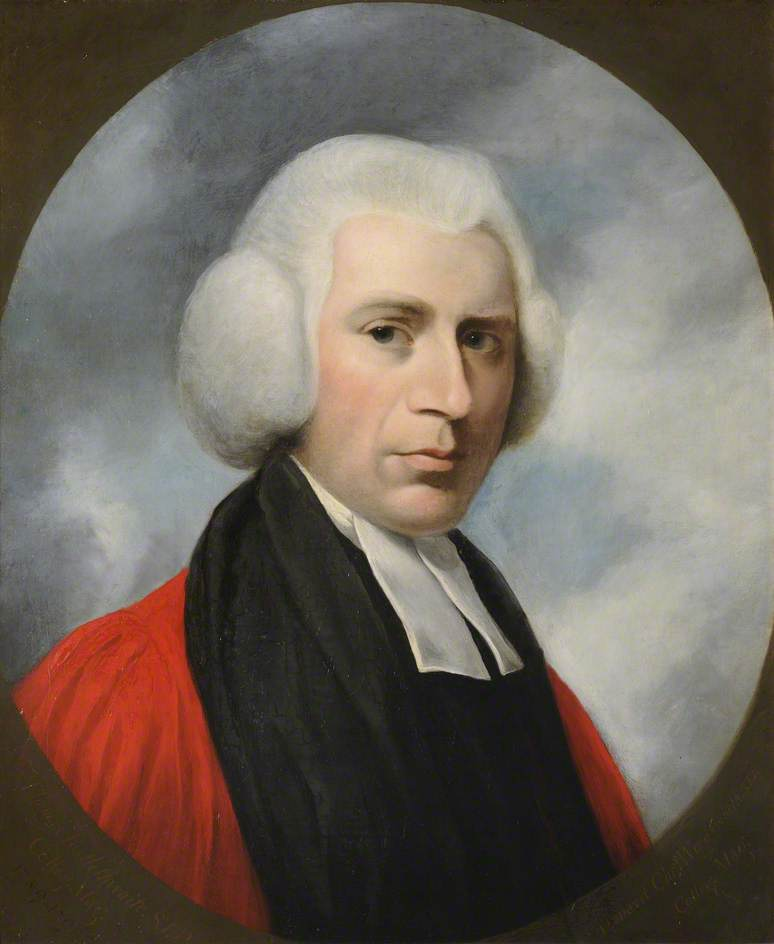
- Born: 1731; Milnthorpe, Westmorland, England
- Died: 4 May 1798 (aged 66–67); Bath, Somerset, England
- Education: Trinity College, Cambridge
- Scientific career
- Fields: Mathematician
- Workplaces: Trinity College, Cambridge
- Academic advisors: Stephen Whisson
- Notable students: Thomas Jones

Thomas Postlethwaite (1731 – 4 May 1798) was an English clergyman and Cambridge fellow, Master of Trinity College, Cambridge from 1789 to 1798.

== Biography ==
Thomas Postlethwaite was the son of Richard Postlethwaite of Crooklands, near Milnthorpe, Westmorland. He attended St Bees School before entering Trinity College, Cambridge as a sizar in 1749. Graduating BA in 1753, he became a fellow of Trinity in 1755. He was Barnaby lecturer in mathematics in 1758. Ordained in 1756, he was from 1774 until his death Rector of Hamerton. He was appointed Master of Trinity in 1789, and in 1791 served as university Vice-Chancellor. He died at Bath on 4 May 1798 and is buried in Bath Abbey church.

He is mainly remembered for depriving the Cambridge classicist Richard Porson of his income, apparently in an attempt to force him to take Holy Orders.

Academic offices
Preceded by John Hinchcliffe	Master of Trinity College, Cambridge; 1789–1798	Succeeded by William Lort Mansel
