= Robert Smith (mathematician) =

English mathematician

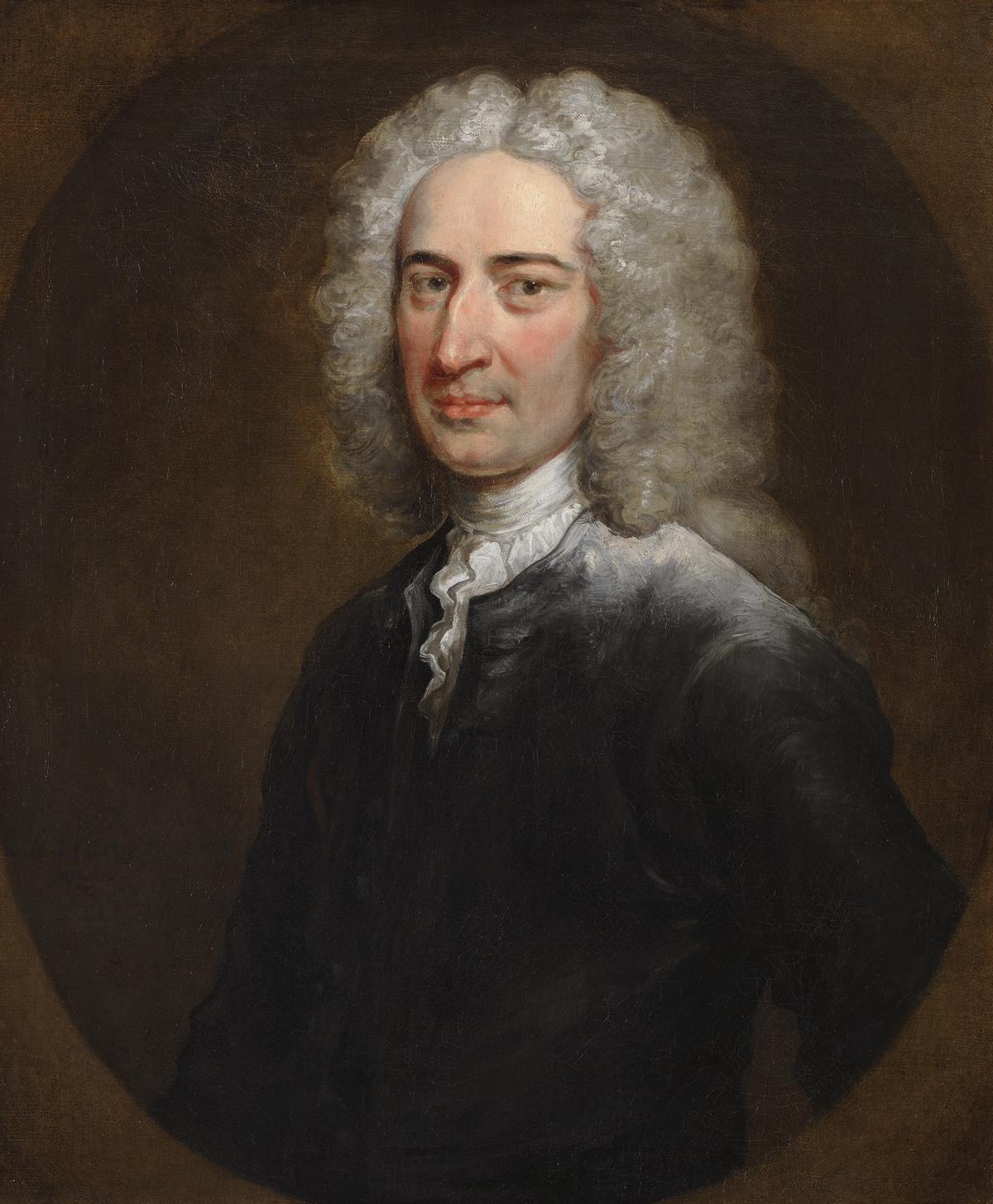
- Portrait by John Vanderbank, 1730
- Born: c. 16 October 1689; Lea, Lincolnshire, England
- Died: 2 February 1768 (aged 78); Cambridge, Cambridgeshire, England
- Education: Trinity College, Cambridge
- Known for: Smith–Helmholtz equation
- Scientific career
- Fields: Mathematician
- Workplaces: Trinity College, Cambridge
- Academic advisors: Roger Cotes
- Notable students: Israel Lyons; Walter Taylor; Richard Watson

Robert Smith (c. 16 October 1689 – 2 February 1768) was an English mathematician.

== Life ==
Smith was probably born at Lea near Gainsborough, the son of John Smith, the rector of Gate Burton, Lincolnshire and his wife Hannah Cotes. After attending Queen Elizabeth's Grammar School, Gainsborough (now Queen Elizabeth's High School) he entered Trinity College, Cambridge, in 1708, and becoming minor fellow in 1714, major fellow in 1715 and senior fellow in 1739, was chosen Master in 1742, in succession to Richard Bentley. From 1716 to 1760 he was Plumian Professor of Astronomy, and he died in the Master's Lodge at Trinity.

In February 1719 he was elected a Fellow of the Royal Society.

Besides editing two works by his cousin, Roger Cotes, who was his predecessor in the Plumian chair, he published A Compleat System of Opticks in 1738, which gained him the sobriquet of Old Focus, and Harmonics, or the Philosophy of Musical Sounds in 1749.

Smith never married but lived with his unmarried sister Elzimar (1683–1758) in the lodge at Trinity College. Although he is often portrayed as a rather reclusive character, John Byrom's journal shows that in the 1720s and 1730s Smith could be quite sociable. Yet ill health, particularly gout, took its toll and severely inhibited his academic work and social activities. He died at the lodge on 2 February 1768, and on 8 February he was buried in Trinity College Chapel, the funeral oration being delivered by Thomas Zouch.

According to the Oxford Dictionary of National Biography, Smith helped to spread Isaac Newton's ideas in Europe and "Newton's successes in optics and mechanics dominated Smith's scientific career".

== The Smith Fund ==
In his will Smith left £3500 South Sea stock to the University of Cambridge. The net income on the fund is annually divided equally between the Smith's Prize and the stipend of the Plumian Professor.

== Books ==
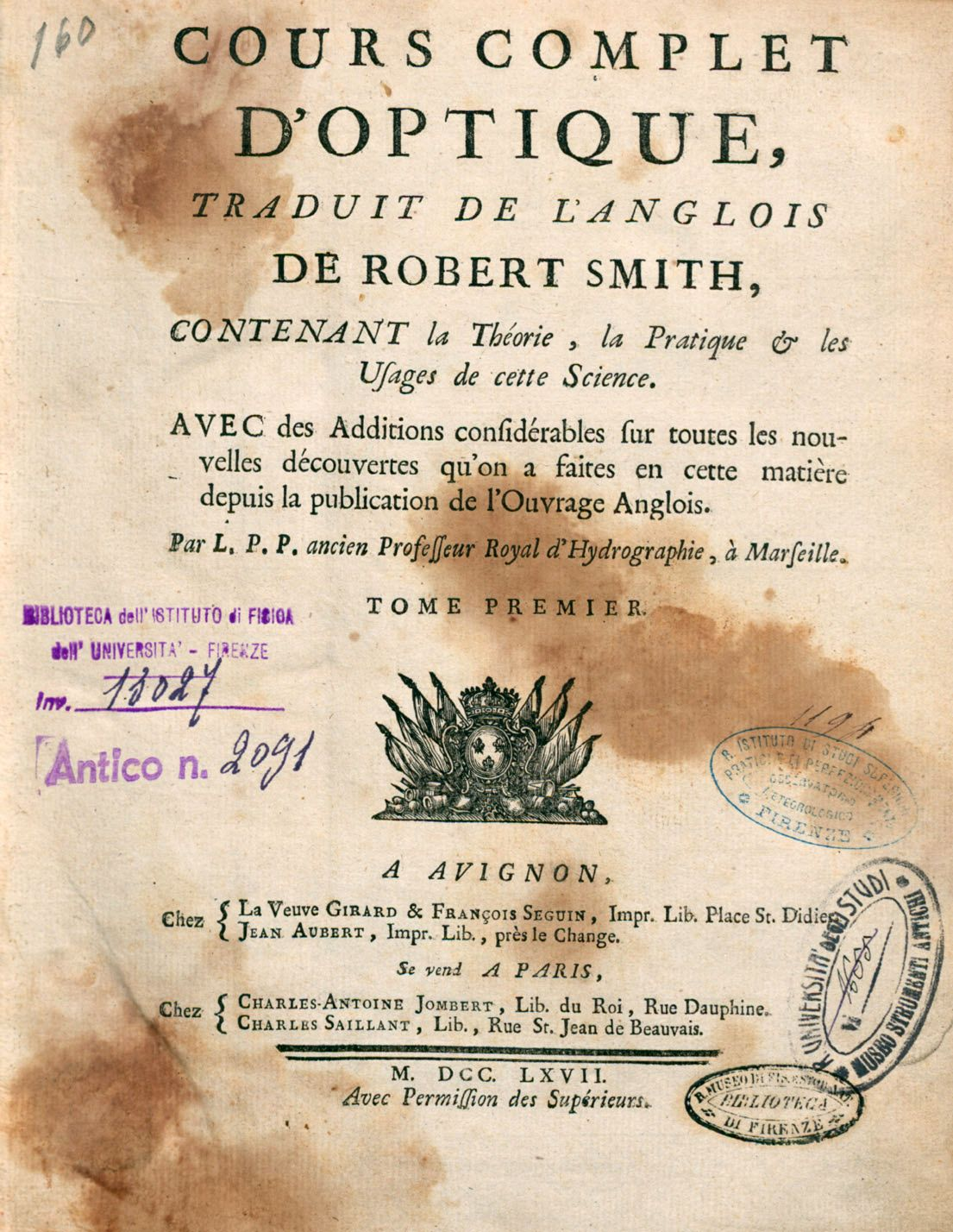
Compleat system of opticks, 1767

- Robert Smith, Harmonics, or, The Philosophy of Musical Sounds, Printed by J. Bentham, and sold by W. Thurlbourn, 1749.
- Robert Smith (1738). A Compleat System of Opticks. Cambridge.
- Robert Smith (1768). Cours complet d'optique traduit de l'anglois de Robert Smith.

Academic offices
Preceded by Richard Bentley	Master of Trinity College, Cambridge; 1742–1768	Succeeded by John Hinchcliffe
