= Robert Lamb (bishop) =

English churchman

Robert Lamb (c.1703 – 3 November 1769) was an English churchman, bishop of Peterborough from 1764.

== Life ==
He was son of Matthew Lamb of London, and nephew of Peniston Lamb, who left him a fortune, as did his father, a prosperous attorney. He was educated at Enfield, Middlesex under Robert Uvedale, and matriculated at Trinity College, Cambridge in 1721. He graduated LL.B. in 1726 and LL.D. in 1728.

He was ordained in 1727, and that year was appointed vicar of Hather and of Keelby, in Lincolnshire. He was Dean of Peterborough from 1744 to 1764. He was rector of Peakirk with Glinton, Northamptonshire, from 1747 to 1763, and then of Hatfield, Hertfordshire from 1763. In 1758 he became a Fellow of the Royal Society.

He was elected Bishop of Peterborough in 1764. He died at Hatfield rectory and was buried there. He was unmarried, and his younger brother Sir Matthew Lamb, 1st Baronet of Brocket Hall inherited his estate.

== Notes ==
Church of England titles
Preceded by Richard Terrick	Bishop of Peterborough; 1764–1769	Succeeded by John Hinchliffe
