= G. T. Lapsley =

- c. 1918
- Born: Gaillard Thomas Lapsley; November 14, 1871; New York, New York, US
- Died: August 17, 1949 (aged 77); New York, New York, US
- Education: Harvard University
- Occupation: Historian

Gaillard Thomas Lapsley (1871–1949) was an American constitutional historian and fellow of Trinity College, Cambridge from 1904 to 1949.

== Biography ==
At Harvard, c. 1893

G. T. Lapsley was born in New York City on November 14, 1871.

He graduated from Harvard University in 1893.

He died in New York City on August 17, 1949.

A brass plaque dedicated to Lapsley's memory can be found in Trinity College Chapel.

== Selected publications ==
- The county palatine of Durham: A study in constitutional history. Longmans Green, New York, 1900.
- The America of today, being lectures delivered at the local lectures summer meeting of the University of Cambridge, 1918. University Press, Cambridge, 1919.
- "The Parliamentary title of Henry IV", English Historical Review, XLIX (1934).
- Some recent advance in English constitutional history: (before 1485). University Press, Cambridge, 1936.
- Crown, community, and Parliament in the later Middle Ages; studies in English constitutional history. Blackwell, Oxford, 1951. (Oxford Studies in Mediaeval History, Vol. 6.)
