= Stephen Whisson =

English educator and librarian (1710–1783)

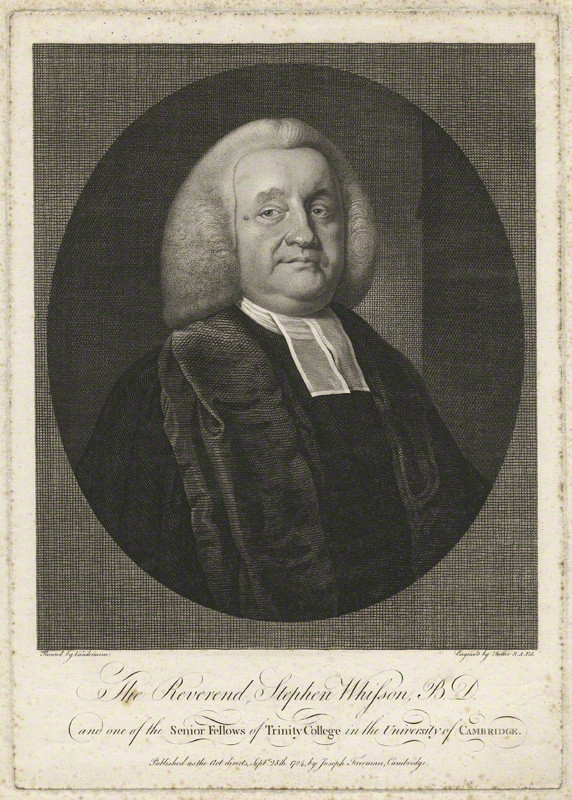
- Born: 1710; St Neots, Huntingdonshire, England
- Died: 3 November 1783 (aged 72–73); Cambridge, England
- Education: Trinity College, Cambridge
- Scientific career
- Fields: Mathematician
- Workplaces: Trinity College, Cambridge
- Academic advisors: Walter Taylor
- Notable students: Thomas Postlethwaite

Stephen Whisson (1710 – 3 November 1783) was a tutor at Trinity College, Cambridge, United Kingdom, and coached 72 students in the 1744–1754 period.

== Biography ==
Wisson was from St Neots, Huntingdonshire and was the son of a publican. In 1735, he matriculated from Wakefield School, Yorkshire.

On 29 November 1734, he was admitted as a sizar at Trinity College, Cambridge, becoming a scholar in 1738.

== Timeline ==
- 1738/9 BA
- 1742 MA
- 1761 BD
- 1741 Fellow of Trinity
- 1744 Taxor
- 1751–83 Cambridge University Librarian
- 1752–80 Senior bursar
- 1757–58 Senior proctor
- 1739 ordained deacon
- 1741 priest
- 1746 – c. 1766 Vicar of Babraham, Cambridgeshire.
- 1753–71 Rector of Shimpling, Norfolk.
- 1771–83 Rector of Orwell, Cambridgeshire.
- 1783 Buried in Trinity Chapel.
