= Frederick Hudson (photographer) =

British spirit photographer

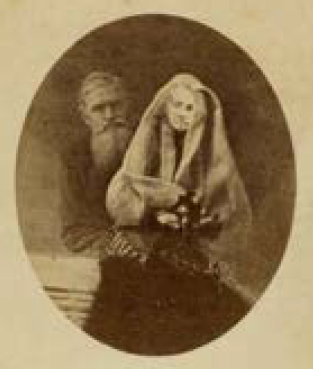
Spirit photograph of Alfred Russel Wallace and his mother, taken by Hudson

Frederick Augustus Hudson (23 January 1818 – 1900) was a British spirit photographer from Westminster who was active in the 1870s.

== Investigations ==
Hudson established his own studio in London, and worked with the medium Georgiana Houghton. He is credited as being the first spirit photographer in Britain.

According to Joseph McCabe, Hudson's photographs were exposed as fraudulent in 1872 by a fellow spiritualist, William Henry Harrison. Hudson was also exposed by another investigator. The psychical researcher Simeon Edmunds wrote that "John Beattie, a professional photographer of note, demonstrated conclusively that his spirits were faked by a simple process of double exposure."

In 1874, Alfred Russel Wallace visited Hudson and a photograph of him with his deceased mother was produced. Wallace declared the photograph genuine, declaring "I see no escape from the conclusion that some spiritual being, acquainted with my mother's various aspects during life, produced these recognisable impressions on the plate."

== Trickery ==
Magic historian Milbourne Christopher has written:

Hudson introduced spirit photography to Britain in 1872. He varied his methods through the years. Though frequently caught practicing deception, he was never arrested. Hudson at one time used a trick camera, made by a craftsman who sold conjuring apparatus. Harry Price described how the camera worked in his book, Confessions of a Ghost-Hunter, published in London in 1936. When the plate slide was inserted, this action brought the paper positive of the "ghost" up against the sensitive plate. When the shutter bulb was pressed, this image and the picture of the sitter were captured on the plate. Thus a single exposure on this plate carried both images.

Hudson was known for staging his spirit photography by either dressing up as spirits or using double exposure techniques. Skeptical investigator Joe Nickell identified Hudson's photographs as fraudulent, noting that in many instances, the sitter was positioned low in the frame to leave room for "spirits" that Hudson had pre-arranged in advance.
