= Robert Burn (classicist) =

British classical scholar

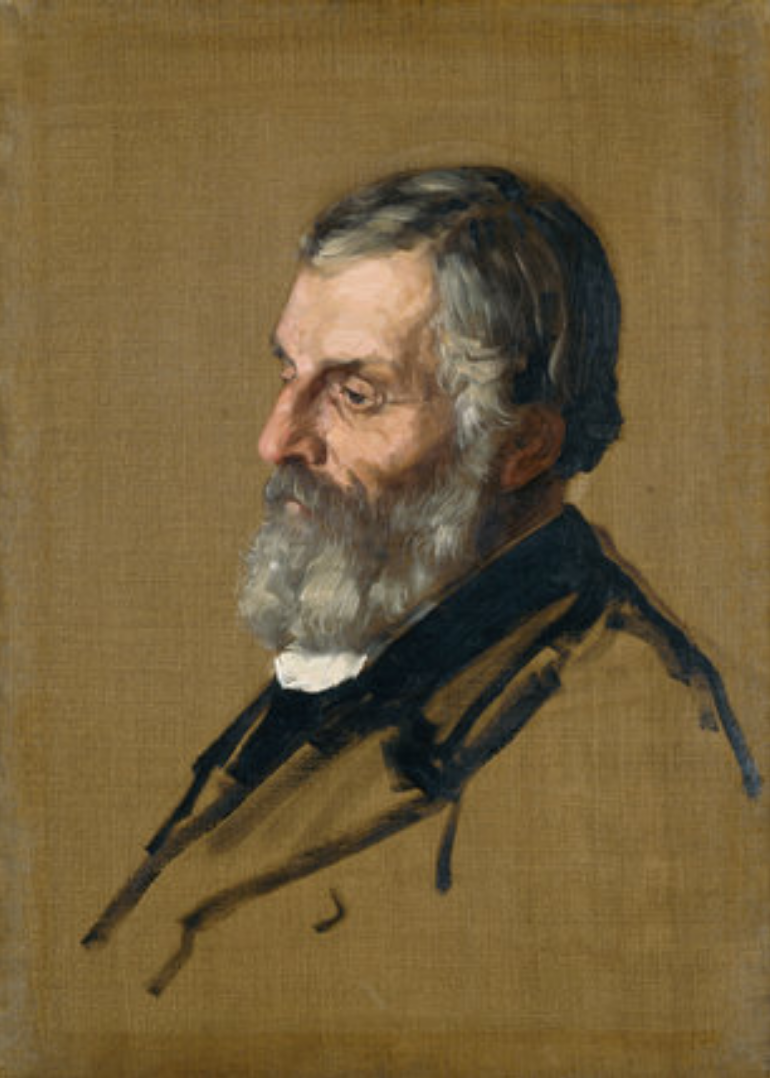
Portrait by Alphonse Legros (1880)

Robert Burn (22 October 1829 – 30 April 1904) was an English classical scholar and archaeologist and Fellow of Trinity College, Cambridge.

== Biography ==
Burn was born at Kynnersley, Shropshire, on 22 October 1829, was second son of Andrew Burn, rector of Kynnersley, by his second wife. (Note: Burn 's elder brother, George, fourth classic and chancellor's medallist at Cambridge in 1851, was fellow of Trinity College.) He was educated at Shrewsbury School under Benjamin Hall Kennedy in 1843 and Trinity College, Cambridge, in 1849.

Burn had remarkable skill in the writing of Latin hexameter verse. He was senior classic in 1852, and took a second class in natural science in 1853. He was elected a fellow of Trinity in 1854, and spent the rest of his life at Cambridge. He was ordained deacon in 1860 and priest in 1862. For many years he lectured on classical subjects; from 1862 to 1872 he was a tutor of Trinity, and discharged the duties of that office with conspicuous success. He vacated his fellowship on his marriage in 1873, but was re-elected next year, and was also appointed praelector in Roman archaeology.

Burn chaired the committee that produced the so-called "Cambridge rules" of football in 1863.

Burn, who frequently visited Rome and its neighbourhood during his vacations, was one of the first Englishmen to study the archaeology of the city and the Campagna. He received an honorary degree from Glasgow University in 1883. He was a distinguished athlete in his youth and a good tennis player up to middle age; but for the last twenty years of his life, though his intellectual interests were unabated, he was an invalid confined to a bath-chair. He died on 30 April 1904 aged 74 and was buried in the Parish of the Ascension Burial Ground in Cambridge. There is a brass to his memory in the ante-chapel of Trinity College.

== Family ==
Burn married in 1873 Augusta Sophia Prescott (a descendant of Oliver Cromwell). They had no children.

== Works ==
Burn published several important works dealing with archaeology in Rome and the Campagna:

1. Rome and the Campagna, Cambridge and London, 1874 [1871]
2. Old Rome, an epitome of the former work, 1880
3. Roman Literature in Relation to Roman Art, 1888
4. Ancient Rome and its Neighbourhood, 1895
