= Coutts Trotter (physicist) =

British physicist and academic administrator

Coutts Trotter (1 August 1837 – 4 December 1887) was a British physicist and academic administrator, vice-master of Trinity College, Cambridge from 1885.

== Life ==
He was the son of the stockbroker Alexander Trotter and his first wife Jacqueline Otter, daughter of William Otter, born on 1 August 1837 in Hampstead; the electrical engineer Alexander Pelham Trotter was his half-brother, and Henry Dundas Trotter his uncle. He was educated at Harrow School, and matriculated at Trinity College, Cambridge, in 1855, graduating B.A. in 1859, and M.A. in 1862.

Trotter was elected a Fellow of Trinity College in 1861. In 1863 he was ordained deacon to a curacy in Kidderminster, where he stayed for two years. He then went to Heidelberg in the German Confederation to study experimental physics under Hermann von Helmholtz and Gustav Kirchhoff from 1865 to 1866. After spending some further time in Italy, he returned to Trinity College, where in 1869 he was appointed lecturer in physical science, a post which he held until 1884.

Settled in Cambridge, Trotter became an influential figure in university administrative affairs, in part because of a polymathic understanding of academic subjects. From 1874 onwards he was a member of the council of the Senate of the university. There were changes in the statutes in 1882, and his role was particularly important for the increased attention to natural science. He was a reformer, and in politics a Liberal. The drive for reform began in Trinity College itself, after William Whewell died in 1866, where Trotter had allies in Henry Sidgwick and Henry Jackson.

In Trinity, Trotter became junior dean in 1870, and senior dean in 1874. He was tutor of his college from 1872 to 1882, and was appointed its vice-master in 1885. He died unmarried in Trinity College on 4 December 1887: at the time he was president of the Cambridge Philosophical Society, and vice-president of the council of Newnham College. He left much of his library, with a bequest in money, to Trinity College, and the remainder of his library and his collection of scientific instruments to Newnham College.

== Legacy ==
From the time of Trotter's death, Trinity College has offered the Coutts Trotter studentship, supported by a bequest of £7,000. The chosen areas were experimental physics and physiology. It was held, for example, by Ernest Rutherford.
