= Edward Blore (cricketer) =

English cricketer and clergyman

Edward William Blore (24 January 1828 – 24 June 1885) was an English amateur cricketer and clergyman who played from 1848 to 1855.

He was a son of Edward Blore, and was educated at Eton College and Trinity College, Cambridge. A right-handed batsman and right arm slow roundarm bowler who was mainly associated with Cambridge University. He made 18 known appearances in important matches.

Blore was President of Cambridge University Cricket Club between 1884 and 1885 and founded the Quidnuncs club with Frederick Hayes Whymper. He was ordained deacon in 1854, and priest in 1855.
