= Frederick Simpson (historian) =

Frederick Arthur Simpson (22 November 1883(?) or 1884 – 6 February 1974) was an Anglican priest, historian and a fellow of Trinity College, Cambridge.

== Career ==
Simpson was educated at Rossall School and Queens' College, Cambridge, graduating B.A. in 1906; and M.A. in 1909. He was ordained deacon in 1909 and priest in 1910, serving his title at St Mary and St Anne, Ambleside. He became a Fellow of Trinity College, Cambridge in 1911, and was a temporary Chaplain to the Forces from 1915 to 1918. While Dean of Chapel at Trinity Simpson controversially queried the divinity of Christ.

He wrote the first two volumes of a life of Louis Napoleon. After this he spent most of the rest of his college life pruning college shrubbery, and was known as "Snipper Simpson".

His change of direction has been attributed to an unfavourable review by Philip Guedalla, but John Polkinghorne ascribes it to an "inner loss of nerve."

== Personal life ==
Simpson was described as a tall, stooped and craggy-featured figure usually wearing a cloth cap and dangling scarf. He had flown the English Channel in his own Gypsy Moth light aircraft. During the early 1930s he was associated with Guy Burgess when the latter was an undergraduate at Trinity College.

== Bibliography ==
- Louis Napoleon and the recovery of France (1923)
- The Rise of Louis Napoleon (1925)
