= Bathurst studentship =

Fund for women science graduates at Cambridge (1879–)

The Bathurst studentship was a fund for graduates of the natural science tripos at the women's colleges at the University of Cambridge to continue their scientific research.

It was established in 1879 by The Hon. Lady Evelyn Selina Bathurst (often called Selina Bathurst, d. 1946). She was the daughter of Allen Bathurst, 6th Earl Bathurst and his second wife Evelyn, née Hankey. She contributed money and equipment for the establishment of the Balfour Biological Laboratory for Women. On 18 June 1898, she married Major George Coryton Lister. They had two children. She died on 16 April 1946.

The Bathurst Studentship, awarded 'from time to time,' was taken up by dozens of women scientists in the late nineteenth and twentieth centuries. Students would work independently, supported by academic supervisors, and were granted bench space in the Balfour Biological Laboratory for Women for their experiments.

== Notable recipients ==
- Florence Eves (1881–2)
- Alice Johnson (1882–3)
- Marion Greenwood (1883–4)
- Anna Bateson (1887–9)
- Edith Saunders (1888–9)
- Elizabeth Eleanor Field (1891–3)
- Mary Tebb (1891–3)
- Gertrude Elles (1895)
- Ethel Skeat (1895–7)
- Mildred Gostling (1899–1900)
- Sibille Ford (1900–2)
- Ida Smedley (1901–3)
- Jessie Slater (1903–5)
- Muriel Onslow (1904)
- Edith Gertrude Willcock (1904–5)
- Annie Homer (1905)
- Mary Gladys Sykes (1908–9)
- Margaret Hume (1912)
- Molly F. Mare (1938)
- Nancy Kirk (1939)
- June Sutor (1954)
- Brigid Hogan (1966)
- Rachel Alcock
- Mary Bernheim
- Dorothy Jordan Lloyd
- Cecilia Payne-Gaposchkin
- Lilian Sheldon
