= Balfour Biological Laboratory for Women =

Laboratory for women students of Cambridge 1884–1914

Coordinates: 52°12′09″N 0°07′25″E

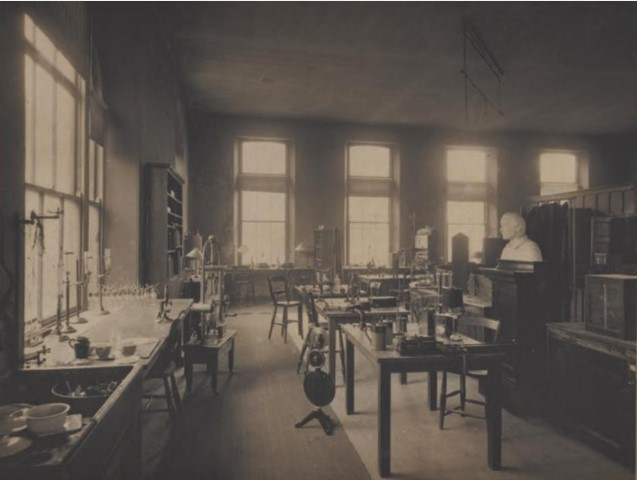
- Interior of the Balfour Laboratory
- Active: 1884–1914
- Affiliation: University of Cambridge

The Balfour Biological Laboratory for Women was a laboratory attached to the University of Cambridge from 1884 to 1914. Established to expand the laboratory capacity and provide a separate space for women's practical work, it served as an important source of academic posts and opportunities for networking and discussion for women at Cambridge until laboratories began being shared by men and women in 1914.

== Background ==
In March 1881, the month after women students received the right to sit the Natural Sciences Tripos at the University of Cambridge, twenty-two natural sciences students at Newnham College, Cambridge presented a memorial to the college's governing body outlining the need for more laboratory space. Newnham, one of two women's colleges at Cambridge, had had a purpose-built laboratory on its grounds since 1879. This laboratory was mostly set up for chemistry, and more space was needed because the Natural Sciences Tripos included a two-day examination in practical laboratory techniques. All laboratory space at Cambridge was becoming oversubscribed due to the increase in students wanting to study natural sciences, but it was also thought appropriate that women, who attended lectures alongside men, should have a separate laboratory facility rather than a shared one.

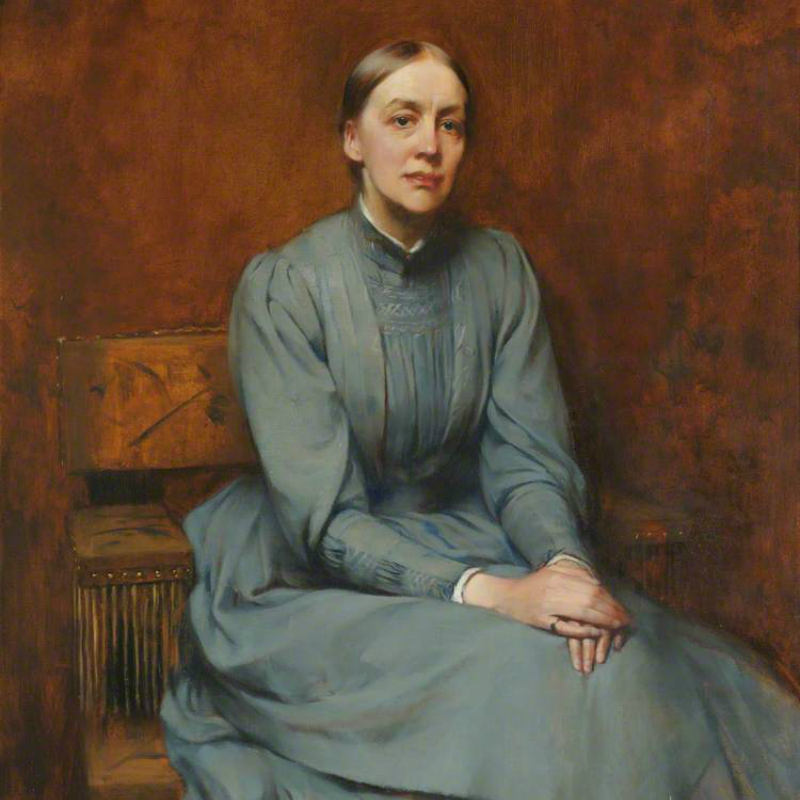
Eleanor Sidgwick was the driving force behind the establishment of the laboratory.

In April 1881, the Newnham College council appointed a subcommittee consisting of Principal Anne Clough, Vice-Principal Eleanor Sidgwick, her brother Francis Maitland Balfour, and Trinity College's Coutts Trotter, to investigate the possibility of establishing a laboratory. The committee selected a site that month, and Eleanor Sidgwick began legal proceedings for purchasing the building in May.

Newnham College raised over £2000 towards the laboratory over the next three years. The other women's college at Cambridge, Girton College, also contributed to the equipping of the laboratory but was not involved in its establishment because it took the position that the laboratory should be established by the University of Cambridge itself, whereas Newnham was willing to proceed independently. Renovations and equipment were also donated by Coutts Trotter and Walter Holbrook Gaskell.

== History ==
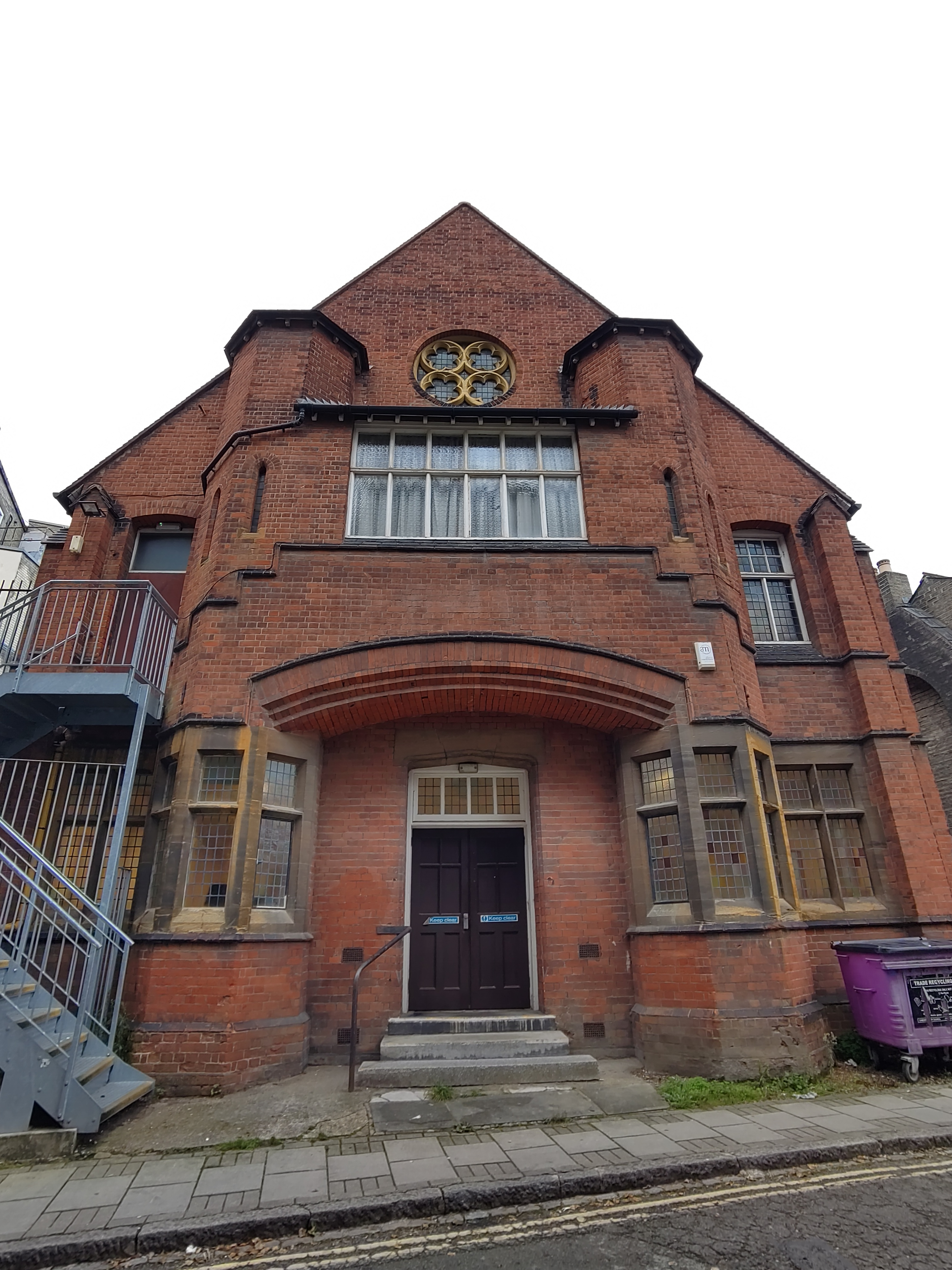
Former Emmanuel Congregational Chapel used as the premises for the Balfour Laboratory, photographed in 2024

The laboratory opened for teaching in the spring of 1884, funded largely by Eleanor Sidgwick, Vice-Principal of Newnham College, and her sister Alice Blanche Balfour. It was named in memory of their brother Francis Maitland Balfour, a biologist who had been a supporter of Newnham College and a member of the committee negotiating to secure the building. Francis had died in a climbing accident on Mont Blanc in 1882 a few months after becoming lecturer in morphology at Cambridge. A bust of him was gifted to the laboratory by his former students. The premises for the laboratory was the former Emmanuel Congregational Chapel at Downing Place, in the centre of Cambridge and a five-minute walk away from the men's laboratory.

The laboratory drew most of its staff and funding from Newnham College, and was also open to students at Girton College, the only other Cambridge college accepting women students at the time. Resources were at first limited, but staff wrote of the sense of excitement at overcoming the obstacles in the early days. At first, the staff consisted only of director Alice Johnson, who had taken the Part I examination in Morphology, and Marion Greenwood, who taught physiology. Physiology student Florence Eves collaborated with Johnson on a prospectus as to how the laboratory should be run. There was also a "young untrained boy" to assist with setting up experiments, so the demonstrators did most of the work preparing specimens and reagents themselves. Greenwood also taught botany, because women were excluded from the botany laboratory by Sydney Howard Vines. As botany became more popular, the Balfour appointed two more staff to teach it in 1886, Lilian Sheldon and Anna Bateson.

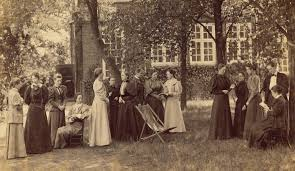
Discussion in the grounds of Newnham College in 1896, featuring Marion Greenwood (second from left) and Edith Saunders (right)

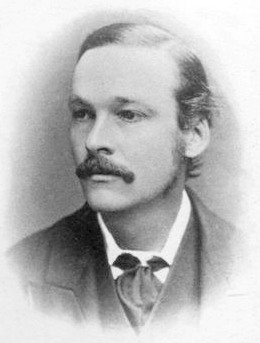
Francis Balfour, the namesake of the Balfour Laboratory and supporter of women's higher education, died at the age of 30.

Demonstrators supervised experiments and tutored students as well as carrying out their own research, and they also offered lectures when women students' access to university lectures was temporarily withdrawn in 1897. An average of forty students per year used the Balfour Laboratory in the 1880s, increasing to about sixty from 1896 when morphology, physics and geology were added to the programme.

The laboratory was refurbished in 1892. By 1910, it had acquired two neighbouring buildings. It contained two floors of laboratories, a lecture room, a greenhouse, and bench space for independent research.

The Balfour laboratory closed for teaching in 1914, by which time women were being admitted to share practical facilities with men, and student numbers were declining due to World War I. The building remained open for women's scientific research until 1927. It also hosted the Department of Biochemistry from 1919 to 1923.

== Personnel ==
The Balfour Laboratory provided academic posts for women which would have been harder to come by otherwise because, being a designated laboratory for women, it needed to appoint women as demonstrators. This led to several women scientists advancing their careers and completing the research necessary to make publications.

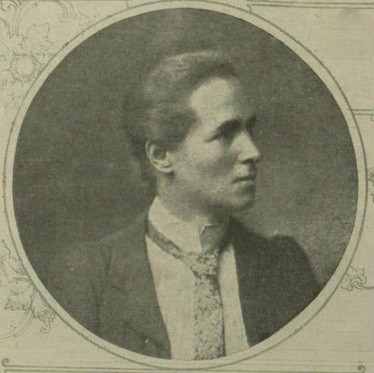
Edith Saunders, the final Director of the Balfour Laboratory

=== Directors ===
- Alice Johnson, demonstrator and director, 1884–1890
- Marion Greenwood, demonstrator in physiology and botany 1884–1888, demonstrator in physiology 1902–3 and head for much of the period 1890–1899
- Edith Saunders, demonstrator in botany 1888–1890 and head 1899–1914

=== Staff ===
- Anna Bateson, demonstrator in botany 1886–7
- Lilian Sheldon, assistant in botany 1886–7 and demonstrator in animal morphology 1893–8
- Laura Russell Howell, demonstrator in animal morphology 1890–2
- Rachel Alcock, demonstrator in animal morphology 1890–1 and 1898–9 and in biology 1903–4
- Helen Klaassen, demonstrator in physics 1891–1901
- Agnes Isabella Mary Elliot, demonstrator in vertebrate morphology 1892–6 (Note: Agnes Elliot, for whom little information is available, received a second class pass in zoology from Newnham College in 1883 and a first class degree with distinction in zoology from London University (which, unlike Cambridge, awarded degrees to women) in 1887.)
- Gertrude Elles, demonstrator in geology 1894–1914
- Elizabeth Dale, assistant in botany 1897–9
- Annie Purcell Sedgwick, assistant in physiology 1897–8
- Elinor Philipps, demonstrator in animal morphology 1898–1902
- Florence Margaret Durham, demonstrator in animal morphology 1898–1900
- Sibille Ford, assistant in animal morphology 1901–2 and in botany 1903–4
- Igerna Sollas, demonstrator in animal morphology and lecturer in animal biology 1902–1912
- Muriel Wheldale, demonstrator in physiological botany 1907–1914
- Mary Gladys Sykes, assistant in botany 1908–9, demonstrator in physiology 1909–10, and demonstrator in vegetable biology 1910–1
- Susila Bonnerjee, demonstrator in physiology 1910–2
- Agnes Robertson, demonstrator in systematic botany 1911–4, continued to use the facilities until 1927

=== Notable students and researchers ===
- Catherine Durning Holt, who co-authored books on heredity with her husband William Cecil Dampier; studied at Balfour 1889–1892
- Mary Tebb, physiologist, served as assistant to Marion Greenwood 1891–3
- Alice Embleton, biologist, studied at Balfour in 1900
- Dorothea Pertz, botanist, conducted research with Francis Darwin
- Gabrielle Matthaei, botanist, conducted research with Frederick Blackman
