= Rachel Alcock =

English physiologist

- Born: 1862; Stockport, Cheshire, England
- Died: 2 February 1939 (aged 76–77)
- Education: Newnham College, Cambridge, Biblioteca Nacional, Liverpool University
- Occupation: physiologist

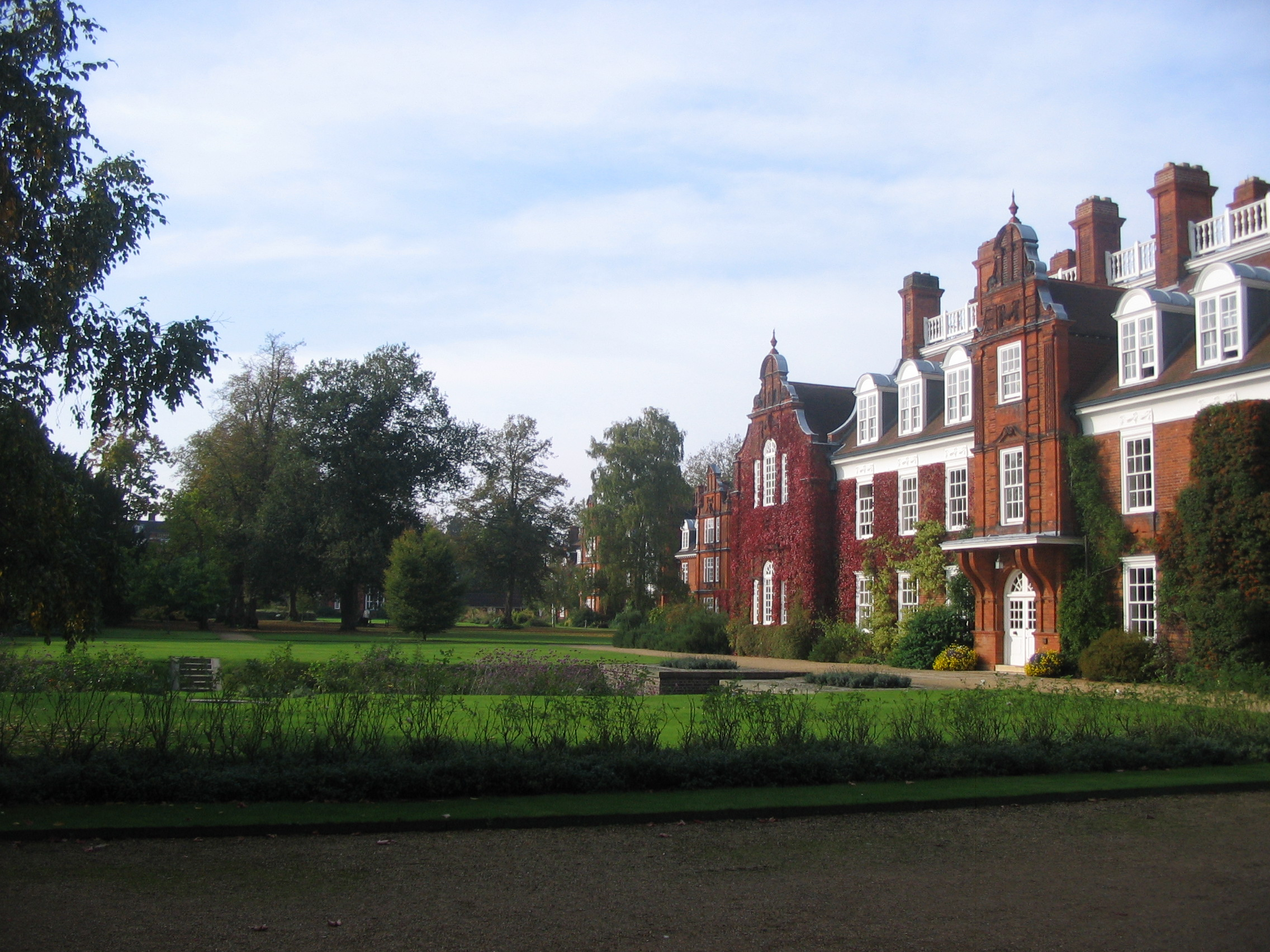
Clough, Newnham College, Cambridge

Rachel Alcock (1862 – 2 February 1939) was an English physiologist and academic.

== Early life and education ==
Born in Stockport, Cheshire, in 1862, Alcock received her early education from tutors and private school. She attended Newnham College, Cambridge, from 1886. She took the Natural Sciences Tripos examinations and stayed on in Newnham with a Bathurst studentship. She undertook research on digestive processes, and on nerve distribution in the primitive fish, which was supervised by British physiologist Walter Gaskell.

Alcock taught morphology and anatomy to women students in the Balfour Laboratory for a short period in 1891 and again in 1898–1899, filling in after the resignation of zoologist Lilian Sheldon.

By the late 1890s, despite continuing to work as a demonstrator in the Balfour Laboratory, Alcock became interested in Spanish literature. She spent two years at the Biblioteca Nacional in Madrid, and in Toledo from 1914 to 1916, and then went on to study for an M.A. at Liverpool University in 1916.
