= Rose Scott-Moncrieff =

Founder of biochemical genetics

- Born: 19 April 1903; Kensington, London, England
- Died: 30 July 1991 (aged 88); Epsom, Surrey, England
- Education: University of Oxford, University of Cambridge (PhD)
- Known for: Founding of the science of biochemical genetics
- Spouse: Oswald Mapletoft Meares
- Children: Two, Jean Meares, John Meares

Rose Scott-Moncrieff (1903-1991), was an English biochemist, credited with founding the science of biochemical genetics.

== Life ==
She was born Rose Scott-Moncrieff in 1903. She studied an undergraduate degree at Imperial College London and received a PhD from Cambridge in 1930. However, because she was a woman she was given only a certificate and she was not allowed to join the university. She worked at the John Innes Horticultural Institution. In the 1930s she worked alongside some of the leading figures in chemistry and genetics. Her recollections of her career were recounted in her book 'The Classical Period in Chemical Genetics. Recollections of Muriel Wheldale Onslow, Sir Robert Robinson and J. B. S. Haldane'.

Rose Scott-Moncrieff joined the Biochemistry department at the University of Cambridge in 1925 and studied under Muriel Onslow (née Wheldale). She continued Wheldale's research into the genetic control of pigmentation in Antirrhinum majus.

In 1929 Scott-Moncrieff received a small grant from the Department of Scientific and Industrial Research which enabled her to begin work with JBS Haldane on the molecular biology of flower colour. In the early period of their collaboration she was based in the laboratory of Professor Gowland Hopkins at the University of Cambridge where Haldane was a Reader. Their experiments were mainly carried out at Merton College, Oxford on the chemistry of anthocyanins. Haldane persuaded her to widen her research to include the chemical and genetic study of flower pigmentation. He also introduced her to the geneticists at John Innes Horticultural Institution where she started on a biochemical survey of related genotypes. Scott-Moncrieff's ability to bring together scientists of a more chemical background with those working on genetics was credited as a large aspect of her success.

In the 1930s Rose Scott-Moncrieff and her colleagues published a number of seminal papers in the Biochemical Journal which determined the metabolic sequence and genetic basis of pigment biosynthesis in flowers. Their research laid the foundation for biochemical genetics and molecular biology.

The first crystalline form of primulin was prepared by Scott-Moncrieff in about 1930. This was the first crystalline anthocyanin pigment ever identified.

Having isolated anthocyanin from purple Antirrhinum majus she now started work on its red variety and on the different strains of Primula sinensis.

After her 1937 marriage to Oswald Mapletoft Meares, an electrical engineer, Scott-Moncrieff's anthocyanin research came to an end. The couple had two children, Jean Rosemary Meares and John Willoughby Meares . They moved to India and remained there until Independence in 1947. Besides raising her children she contributed to war-time investigations of camouflage, was Divisional Girl Guide Commissioner for Cawnpore, India and acquired a special insight into Indian education, becoming President of the Women's Section of the All-India Basic Education Conference in January 1945. On their return to England the family settled at 'Windyridge', One Tree Hill Road in Guildford. Her husband died on 28 April 1973.

== Legacy ==
Scott-Moncrieff's book in which she describes her contemporaries is a good source for historians, but Cathie Martin has argued that the credit for starting chemical genetics should go to Rose Scott-Moncrieff herself, rather than her mentor, Muriel Wheldale Onslow.

Rose Scott-Moncrieff....Working with an extremely difficult system (biochemically) she made discoveries that are still of relevance today. Over the past ten years anthocyanin research has re-emerged as a hugely important field because of the health-protecting and health-promoting effects of dietary anthocyanins, which are consumed in significant amounts in super foods such as blackberries, blackcurrants, cranberries, strawberries, raspberries. Many of the scientific principles described by Rose Scott-Moncrieff remain relevant and important today, particularly in the rapidly growing area of natural colourants, where anthocyanins are fast replacing synthetic colourants as not only safe, but also health-promoting natural alternatives., C.Martin

In 2017, the John Innes Centre, where Scott-Moncrieff worked in the 1930s, launched an annual Rose Scott-Moncrieff lecture, with the inaugural lecture given by Hopi Hoekstra.
