= Florence Eves =

English physiologist (d. 1911)

Florence Elizabeth Eves (d. 1911) was an English physiologist noted as the first woman to receive a degree in physiology.

Educated at North London Collegiate School, she took classes at University College London before studying the natural science tripos at Newnham College, Cambridge in 1878. She gained a class I pass in 1881, and received her BSc from the University of London that year as Cambridge was not awarding degrees to women. She came highest in the class in the London examinations for botany and physiology.

Eves was one of the first recipients of a Bathurst studentship to continue her research at Newnham in 1881–2, and worked as a demonstrator in chemistry at Newnham from 1881 to 1887.

She studied the process of liver ferment, publishing solo and with John Newport Langley about her findings in the Journal of Physiology.

She was involved with the establishment of the Balfour Biological Laboratory for Women, raising funds for it in 1881 (including a donation from Charles Darwin) and collaborating with Marion Greenwood on a prospectus for its teaching when it opened in 1884.

From 1887, Eves was a teacher at Manchester High School for Girls and St Leonards School, St Andrews. She was interested in social reform, and became head of the Women’s House of the Christian Socialist Union in Hoxton.

She died on 11 February 1911.

== Select publications ==
- (with John Langley) 'On certain conditions which influence the amylolytic action of saliva,' Journal of Physiology 4 (1883) 18–28
- 'On some experiments on the liver ferment,' Proceedings of the Cambridge Philosophical Society 5 (1884) 182–3
- 'Some experiments on the liver ferment,' Journal of Physiology 5:4–6 (1885) 342–351
