= Mary Tebb =

English physiologist (1868 – 1953)

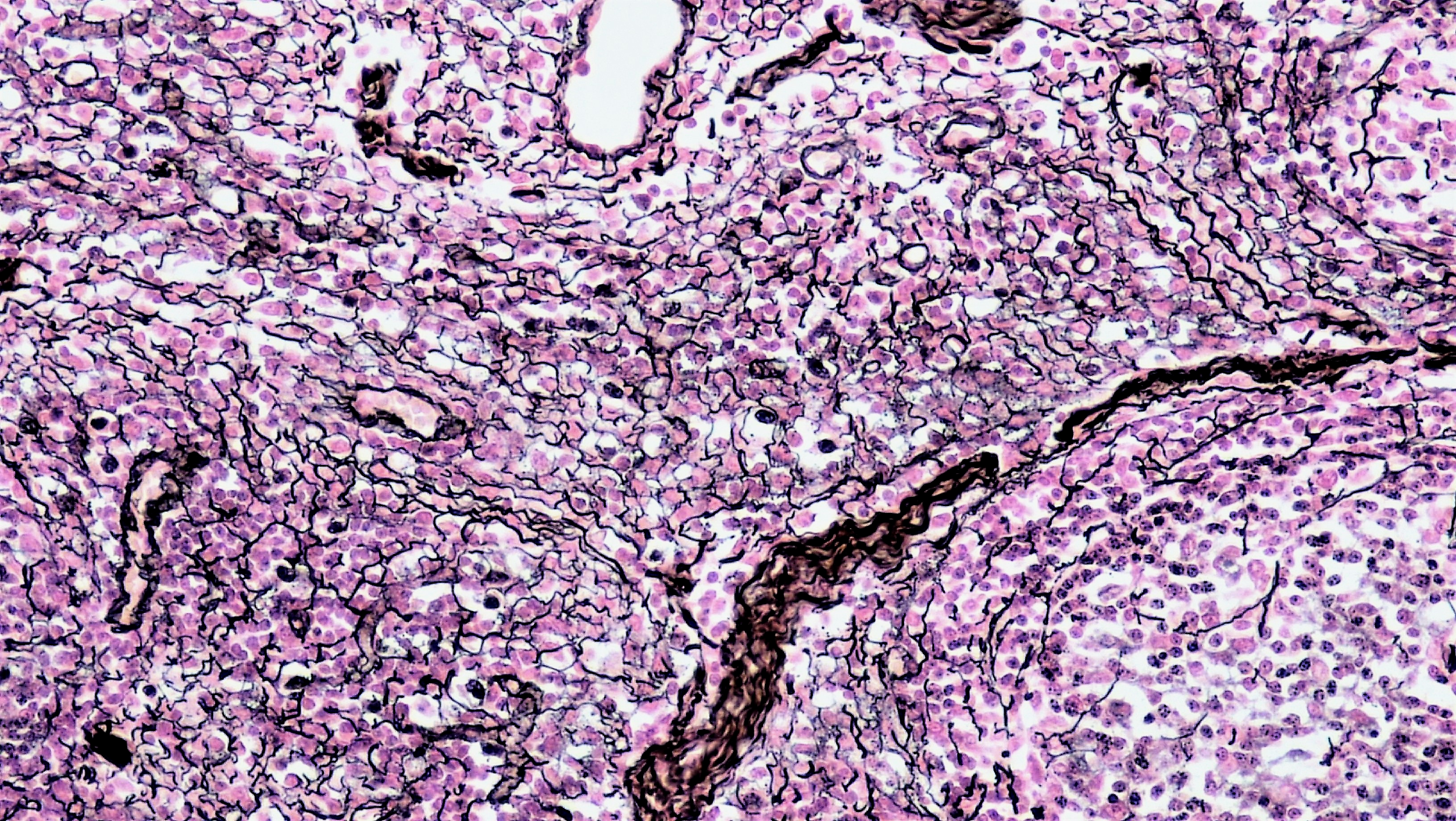
Mary Tebb studied substances including protagon, reticulin (pictured), cholesterol, and spermine

Mary Christine Rosenheim (née Tebb, 1868 – 1953) was an English physiologist. She is particularly known for her work with Otto Rosenheim on the crystalline material protagon.

== Early life ==
Mary was the daughter of businessman and activist William Tebb and his wife Mary, née Scott. Her brother William was a medical doctor and her sister Florence was a mathematician who, like Mary, studied at Girton. Mary was educated at Bedford College, London, from 1882 to 1887.

== Career ==
At Girton College, Cambridge, Mary studied natural sciences between 1887 and 1893, where she gained a double first and specialised in physiology in Part II. She held a Bathurst studentship and was assistant to Marion Greenwood (later Marion Bidder), leader of the Balfour Biological Laboratory for Women, between 1891 and 1893.

She then moved to King's College, London, where she worked at William Dobinson Halliburton's Chemical Physiology Laboratory until 1910, and at the Physiology Laboratory from 1910 to 1916.

During this time, she published papers on enzymatic hydrolysis of complex carbohydrates and on the structure of protein fibres in connective tissue. This brought her into a controversy about the nature of reticulin which was not resolved until much later.

Between 1907 and 1910, she collaborated with King's College's lecturer in physiological chemistry, Otto Rosenheim, a German chemist who had emigrated to England in 1894 to escape antisemitism. They studied protagon, a crystalline material produced by the brain, and established that it was a mixture rather than a chemical compound. In the words of an obituarist, 'They laid the bogy of protagon, around which unseemly controversy had raged.' Tebb and Rosenheim married in July 1910.

Mary received grants from the Royal Society to study cholesterol until 1916.

Spermine

In 1923, she worked at the Medical Research Council in Hampstead along with Rosenheim. They studied spermine, having established the conditions for the reproduction of spermine phosphate crystals while at King's College.

She died in 1953, being nursed by her husband for the last two years of her life.

== Select publications ==
- 'Reticulin and Collagen,' Journal of Physiology 27:6 (1902), 463-472
- (with Otto Rosenheim) 'The non-existence of "protagon" as a definite chemical compound,' Journal of Physiology 36:1 (1907), 1–16
