= Primulin =

Primulin may refer to:

- Primulin (anthocyanin), a phenolic compound
- an alternate spelling for primuline, a dye containing the benzothiazole ring system
- Primulines, one of the main hybrid groups of the ornamental flower Gladiolus
