= Alice Johnson (zoologist) =

English zoologist

- Born: 7 July 1860; Cambridge
- Died: 13 January 1940 (aged 79); Cambridge

Academic background
- Education: Newnham College
- Influences: Francis Maitland Balfour; Adam Sedgwick

Academic work
- Institutions: Balfour Laboratory; Society for Psychical Research; Newnham College
- Main interests: early development of the newt

Alice Johnson (7 July 1860 – 13 January 1940) was an English zoologist. She also edited the proceedings of the Society for Psychical Research from 1899 to 1916.

== Life ==
The daughter of William Henry Farthing Johnson, a private school master, and Harriet Brimsley, she was born in Cambridge. Her brother was the logician William Ernest Johnson. She was educated in Cambridge and Dover, entering Newnham College in 1878. In 1881, she was placed in the equivalent of the First Class of the Natural Sciences Tripos (at that time, as a woman, she was not permitted to earn a degree). She was the first director of the Balfour Biological Laboratory for Women. From 1884 to 1890 Johnson was also a demonstrator in animal morphology at the laboratory. She continued her studies with Francis Balfour and, after Balfour's death in 1882, with Adam Sedgwick. Her research included studies of the early development of the newt. In 1884, she published the first paper by a woman to appear in the Proceedings of the Royal Society. She also published a study on the development of cranial nerves in the newt embryo with Lilian Sheldon, then a student at Newnham College.

In 1890, she became private secretary to Eleanor Mildred Sidgwick, a leading figure in the Society for Psychical Research. Johnson was secretary for the Society from 1903 to 1907 and was its research officer from 1907 to 1916. She assisted in the so-called "Brighton experiments" in thought transference. Johnson also worked for the Society on the Census of Hallucinations. She prepared the work Human Personality and Its Survival of Bodily Death by Frederic W. H. Myers for publication; it had been left uncompleted after Myers' death. Johnson resigned from the SPR in 1917.

Eleanor Sidgwick became principal for Newnham College in 1892 and Johnson served as her secretary until 1903. From 1893 to 1902, Johnson was also an associate of the college.

She died in Cambridge at the age of 79.

== Publications ==
- Johnson, Alice (1884). "On the changes and ultimate fate of the blastopore in the newt (Triton cristatus)". Proceedings of the Royal Society of London. 37 (232): 65–66. doi:10.1098/rspl.1884.0014.
- Johnson, Alice; Sheldon, Lilian (1886). "On the development of the cranial nerves of the newt". Proceedings of the Royal Society of London. 40 (242): 94–95. doi:10.1098/rspl.1886.0016. S2CID 84493318.
- Johnson, Alice. (1908). Report on Some Recent Sittings for Physical Phenomena in America. Proceedings of the Society for Psychical Research 21: 94-135.
- Johnson, Alice. (1908). On the Automatic Writing of Mrs. Holland. Proceedings of the Society for Psychical Research 21: 166-391.
- Johnson, Alice. (1909). The Education of the Sitter. Proceedings of the Society for Psychical Research 21: 483-511.

== See also ==
- Timeline of women in science
