= Elinor Philipps =

English science educator and missionary (1872 – 1965)

- Born: Elinor Mary Beatrice Philipps; 1 September 1872; Winfrith, Dorset, England
- Died: 1965 (aged 92–93)

Elinor Mary Beatrice Philipps (1 September 1872 – 1965) was an English science educator and missionary.

She was born 1 September 1872 in Winfrith, Dorset.

She studied the natural science tripos at Newnham College, Cambridge in 1894–5, and then taught as an assistant mistress at Bradford Girls' Grammar School. In 1897, Adam Sedgwick withdrew permission for women at the University of Cambridge to attend his lectures in morphology, so the Balfour Biological Laboratory for Women added a lecture room to their premises and appointed Philipps as lecturer in morphology, a post she held from 1898 to 1902.

She then travelled to Japan, and taught at Japan Women's University, Tokyo, until 1941. She was attached to St Hilda’s Mission for Women.

In 1941, she travelled to Canada to continue her missionary work.

She died in 1965.
