= Sibille Ford =

English botanist and zoologist (1874–1932)

Sibille Ormston Ford (1874 – 1932) was an English botanist and zoologist.

She was born in Leeds, the daughter of a silk mill manager, in 1874. She was the niece of reformer Isabella Ormston Ford.

Ford gained a first class pass in botany and zoology at Newnham College, Cambridge in 1899. She received a Bathurst studentship to continue her studies in 1900–2, and taught as an assistant in animal morphology at the Balfour Biological Laboratory for Women in 1901–2. She received a BA from Trinity College, Dublin in 1906 (where Cambridge alumni would travel to receive their degrees while Cambridge was not awarding them to women).

She published several solo and joint papers on plant anatomy, including a review of the Araucariaceae with Albert Seward which was published by the Royal Society in 1906.

Ford was a Quaker, and assisted with the Friends Relief Mission in Bar-le-Duc, Verdun in 1918–20.

She died in Grange-Over-Sands, Cumbria in 1932.

== Select works ==
- 'The anatomy of Ceratopteris Thalictroides' (1902)
- (with Alfred Seward) 'The Anatomy of Todea, with notes on the geological history and affinities of the Osmundaceae' (1903)
- 'The Anatomy of Psilotum triquetrum' (1904)
- (with Alfred Seward) 'The Araucarieae, recent and extinct' (1906)
