= Khadijah Mellah =

English jockey (born 2000)

Khadijah Mellah (born 2000) is the first hijab-wearing jockey in a competitive British horse race. Despite being new to horse-racing, she won the Magnolia Cup on her mount Haverland.

Mellah's story was the subject of the TV documentary Riding a Dream first broadcast on 16 November 2019.

== Background ==
Mellah was born in Peckham, London, the daughter of Ali Mellah and his wife, Selma. Her parents were, respectively, from Algeria and Kenya. Mellah was always keen to ride, and her mother saw a leaflet in the local mosque offering riding (mainly ponies) at the Ebony Horse Club in Brixton; she started riding in 2012.

Followed by a camera crew she began riding a thoroughbred horse in April 2019. She was also sitting her A-levels at Sydenham High School at this time. The documentary makers had no idea that she would win the race; the documentary was primarily aimed at showing the diversity of activities available to disadvantaged communities in London.

Mellah was chosen to represent the club at a charity race. She had to undertake two months of intensive training at the British Racing School, at Newmarket. This included ensuring her own physical fitness and bonding with the horse. The race, the Magnolia Cup, is an all-women charity race. It was held on 1 August 2019 at Goodwood racecourse.

Before the race started, the odds on Haverland were 25:1. Mellah was both the youngest and by far the least-experienced jockey of the 12-strong field, who included Victoria Pendleton, Luisa Zissman and Vogue Williams.

The 5.5-furlong race saw Haverland boxed-in mid-way, but with two furlongs to go an opening appeared to the left and Haverland was guided past the four leading horses to a photo-finish. Around 15 seconds later Haverland was declared the winner. Mellah received applause in the winners enclosure.

Mellah, who was in the midst of her A-levels at the beginning of the ordeal, went on to study Mechanical Engineering at Brighton University. In November 2019 she won The Times Young Sportswoman of the Year for her achievements.

== Filming ==
The drama of the event was hugely enhanced by the "jockey's eye view" afforded by helmet-mounted dashcams on all riders in the race. This film footage also records Mellah's emotional words as she realises she is going to win.

The documentary premièred at the Ritzy Cinema in Brixton, with Mellah, the club patron Oliver Bell and Camilla, Duchess of Cornwall as guests, prior to its TV screening.

== Riding A Dream Academy ==
In 2021, Mellah co-founded the Riding A Dream Academy, with the aim of increasing the number of young horse riders from under-represented communities in racing. Among the academy's graduates is Aamilah Aswat, who in November 2025 became the first black British female jump jockey to ride in Britain.
