= Henderina Scott =

English botanist (1862–1929)

Henderina Victoria Scott
- Born: Henderina Victoria Klaassen; 18 July 1862; Brixton, London
- Died: 18 January 1929 (aged 66); East Oakley House, Basingstoke, Hampshire
- Education: Royal College of Science, 1887
- Known for: Use of cinematography to research plant growth and movement
- Spouse: Dukinfield Henry Scott (1854–1934)
- Children: 7
- Awards: Fellow of the Linnean Society of London (1905)

Henderina Victoria Scott (18 July 1862 – 18 January 1929) was an English botanist who pioneered time-lapse photography of plants.

== Early life and education ==
She was born Henderina Victoria Klaassen in Brixton in the Surrey outskirts of London in 1862. Her father, Hendericus M. Klaassen, had emigrated from Hanover, Germany and was a successful businessman. In later life he became enthusiastic about science, especially geology, and his daughters Henderina and Helen were interested in science from childhood.

While studying botany at the Royal College of Science in 1886 she got to know one of the lecturing staff, Dukinfield Henry Scott, who gave advanced classes in botany at the Jodrell Laboratory, Kew. They married in 1887 and she assisted his career as well as conducting her own botanical research. She did not hold an academic post.

== Research ==
Scott assisted her husband with his research. For example, she catalogued and indexed his collections of fossil slides and provided illustrations for his textbooks. However, she also undertook her own independent research in botany and paleobotany.

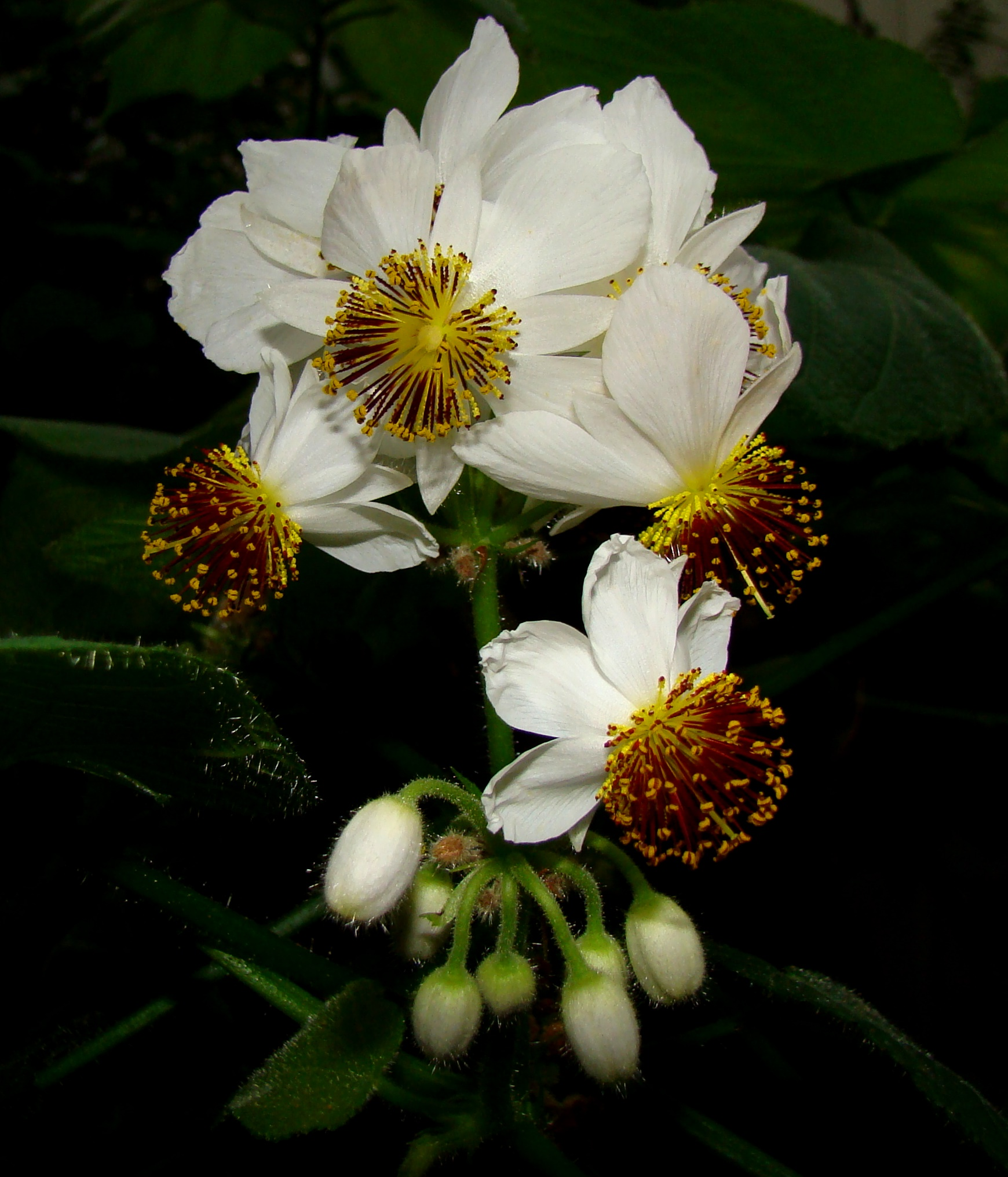
Sparrmannia africana

Her most innovative work was applying cinematography to record plant growth. She published her application of time-lapse photography to capture the movement of flowers of Sparmannia africana, the African linden or African hemp. She had been in communication with Harry Bolus for information on the natural history of this species. Movement of the stamens had already been recorded by botanists but the petals, sepals and entire flower bud are also capable of comparatively rapid movement. Individual flowers of this species lived much longer in greenhouses in the UK than in its warmer natural habitat in South Africa. In addition to recording flower circumnutation and opening through drawings, she also applied cinematography. After reviewing available and affordable systems she used a Kammatograph, a filmless system available from 1900 where photographs are taken on a glass disc and could be projected using a magic lantern system. Kamm and Co. provided assistance in optimising the Kammatograph for her time-lapse studies. Some of these photographs were included in her scientific publications. None of the at least 12 original film discs have survived.

Her further slow motion time-lapse photography showed plant activity such as the opening of buds, pollination by a bee and the opening of a shoot, among others. This was substantially before the better-known early time-lapse photographs of flowers by F. Percy Smith.

Her time-lapse films were shown at several scientific meetings. These included a Royal Society conversazione in June 1904, the British Association for the Advancement of Science meeting in August 1904, Holmesdale Natural History Club in Reigate in December the same year, the Linnean Society in London in March 1905 (after she had been admitted as a Fellow), and a Royal Horticultural Society meeting in 1906. She is also recorded as showing her animated photographs at the Linnean Society again in 1907.

She continued to research and publish after the family moved from London to near Basingstoke.

== Personal life ==
She bore seven children, one of whom died in infancy; only four survived to adulthood. In 1907 she and her husband retired to East Oakley House near Basingstoke in Hampshire where she became involved in school and local politics, as well as hosting visits from many international botanists. She died at home, unexpectedly, after a short illness on 18 January 1929.
