= Muriel Onslow =

English biochemist

- Born: Muriel Wheldale; 31 March 1880; Birmingham, England
- Died: 19 May 1932 (aged 52); Cambridge
- Education: University of Cambridge
- Known for: Inheritance of flower colour
- Spouse: Victor Alexander Herbert Huia Onslow (died 1922)
- Awards: Bathurst studentship (1904)
- Scientific career
- Fields: Biochemistry, botany
- Workplaces: John Innes Horticultural Institution, University of Cambridge

Muriel Onslow (née Wheldale; 31 March 1880 – 19 May 1932) was a British biochemist, born in Birmingham, England. She studied the inheritance of flower colour in the common snapdragon Antirrhinum and the biochemistry of anthocyanin pigment molecules. She attended the King Edward VI High School in Birmingham and then matriculated at Newnham College, Cambridge in 1900. At Cambridge she majored in botany. Onslow later worked within William Bateson's genetic group and then Frederick Gowland Hopkins' biochemical group in Cambridge, providing her with expertise in biochemical genetics for investigating the inheritance and biosynthesis of petal colour in Antirrhinum. She was one of the first women appointed as a lecturer at Cambridge, after moving to the Biochemistry department.

== Education and personal life ==
She was the only child of her parents John and Fannie (née Hayward) Wheldale. Her father was a solicitor. She attended King Edward VI High School in Birmingham, which was well known amongst single-sex schools for its strong science teaching to girls. In 1900, she entered Newnham College, Cambridge and achieved a First Class result in Part I of the Natural Sciences Tripos in 1902. She took Part II (Botany) in 1904 and again achieved a First Class result but was not awarded a degree since University of Cambridge did not award degrees to women until 1948.

In 1919, she married biochemist Victor Alexander Herbert Huia Onslow, second son of the 4th Earl of Onslow. They had no children. He had recently entered the field of chemical genetics, and their work was closely associated. Victor Onslow was paralysed from the waist down following a diving accident and died in 1922. In her memoir for her husband she wrote that he was a man of amazing courage and mental vitality enabling him to gain a career in biochemistry despite his physical circumstances, and with her encouragement and assistance.

She died at her home in Cambridge on 19 May 1932, aged 52.

== Career ==
Her work was funded initially by a Bathurst studentship in 1904 and then Newnham College fellowship for 6 years, starting in 1909.

In 1903, she joined William Bateson's genetics group at Cambridge where she began her study focusing on the inheritance of petal colour in Antirrhinum (snapdragons). Bateson was the English biologist who was the first person to use the term genetics to describe the study of heredity, and the chief populariser of the ideas of Gregor Mendel following their rediscovery in 1900. Bateson and Onslow, alongside a research group mainly made up of Newnham College graduates, carried out a series of breeding experiments in various plant and animal species between 1903 and 1910.

By 1906, she had enough data to formulate a rudimentary factorial analysis on snapdragon inheritance. In 1907, Wheldale published a full explanation what became termed epistasis, the phenomenon of dominant-like relationship between different pairs of nonallelomorphic factors. Wheldale's study of genetics on flower coloration ultimately gained her the most recognition, with the 1907 publication of a full factorial analysis of flower colour inheritance in snapdragons and the four subsequent papers she published from 1909 to 1910. Her interest was in the biochemistry underlying the petal colours, rather than understanding inheritance itself. Her study of the chemistry of the anthocyanin pigments culminated in publication of her first book in 1916, The Anthocyanin Pigments of Plants. This application of chemical analysis to explain genetic data led to international recognition since it was among the first attempts at syntheses of these two areas.

She was an assistant lecturer in Newnham College between 1906 and 1908.

She left Cambridge University between 1911 and 1914 owing to a studentship at the John Innes Horticultural Institution where, in addition to her laboratory work, she was valued as the Institution's leading botanical artist, able to capture the exact colours of plants. In 1913, she became one of the first three women to be elected to the Biochemical Society, after the society's initial exclusion of women in 1911.

She joined the biochemistry lab of Frederick Gowland Hopkins at Cambridge University in 1914, where she pursued the biochemical aspects of petal colour, whose genetics she had elucidated during her work with Bateson. She worked on oxidase systems which were also involved in additional areas of plant biology. This led her to work for the Food Investigation Board from 1917 onward and then, and from 1922 leading a team working on fruit ripening at the Cambridge Low Temperature Station from 1922. Between 1917 and 1922 she collaborated with Victor Onslow on the colour and iridescence in insect scales. In 1925 she produced a second, substantially revised edition of her book The Anthocyanin Pigments of Plants, updated for the substantial developments in the field since the first 1916 edition.

In combining genetics and biochemistry she became one of the first biochemical geneticists and paved the way for the later successes of such seminal investigators as Edward Tatum and George Beadle.

In 1926, she was one of the first women appointed as a University Lecturer at Cambridge, in plant biochemistry in the biochemistry department. Students considered that she was an inspiring teacher and her course in plant biochemistry was an important part of the advanced botany curriculum.

Amongst her followers was Rose Scott-Moncrieff who went on to identify the first crystalline form of primulin in about 1930. This was the first crystalline anthocyanin pigment ever identified. Onslow and Scott-Moncrieff have been credited with founding biochemical genetics, although Scott-Moncrieff is thought to have the stronger claim.

== Legacy ==
There is a prize and research fellowship named after her at Newnham College, University of Cambridge.

In 2010 the Royal Institution of Great Britain staged a play, entitled Blooming Snapdragons, about four early-20th-century women biochemists, one of whom was Onslow. Written by Liz Rothschild and directed by Sue Mayo, it had been commissioned by the John Innes Centre where Onslow worked.

== Books by Muriel Onslow ==
- The Anthocyanin Pigments of Plants, 1916, revised in 1925
- Practical Plant Biochemistry, 1920
- Principles of Plant Biochemistry, Volume 1, 1931
