= Dukinfield Henry Scott =

British botanist

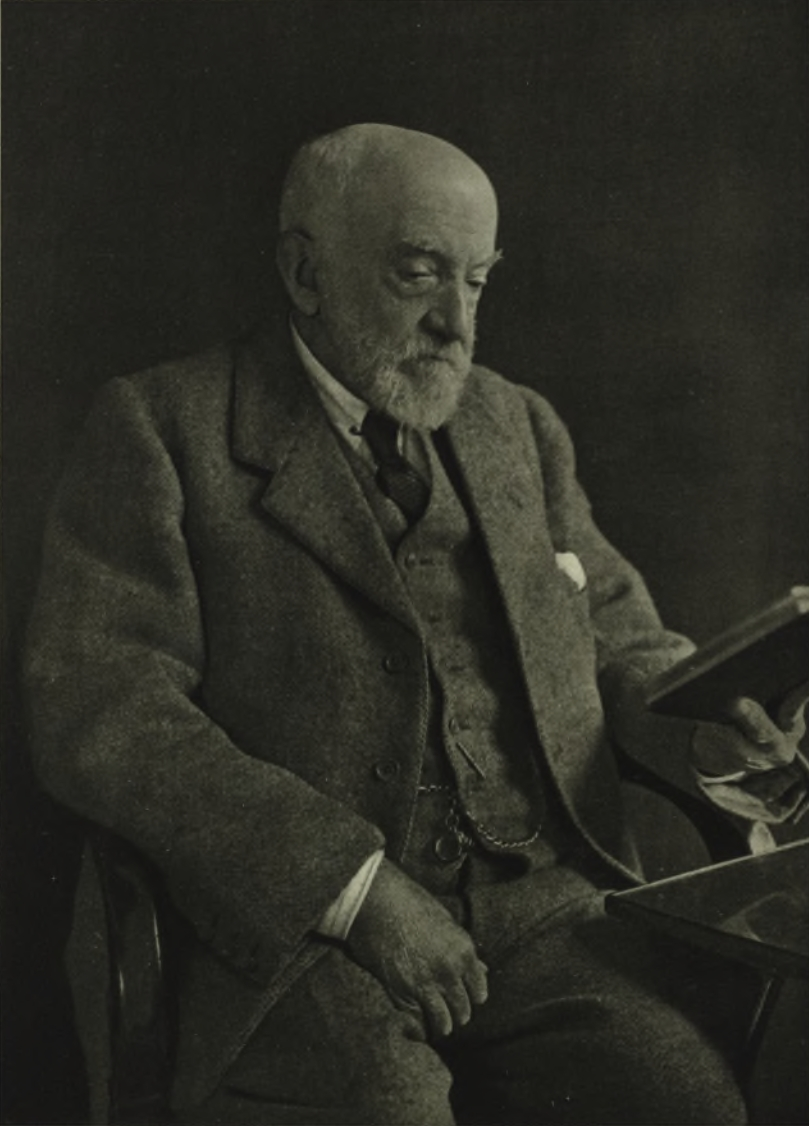
- D. H. Scott
- Born: 28 November 1854; London
- Died: 29 January 1934 (aged 79)
- Education: Christ Church, Oxford; Würzburg University
- Scientific career
- Fields: Botany
- Workplaces: University College London; Royal College of Science; Royal Botanic Gardens, Kew
- Doctoral advisor: Julius von Sachs
- Author abbrev. (botany): D.H.Scott

Dukinfield Henry Scott FRS HFRSE LLD (28 November 1854 – 29 January 1934) was a British botanist and paleobotanist. The standard author abbreviation D.H.Scott is used to indicate this person as the author when citing a botanical name. He conducted research on plant fossils and examined the evolution of plants. His textbook Studies in Fossil Biology and his lectures on paleobotany at University College, London, influenced and helped grow paleobotany.

== Early life ==
Scott was born in London on 28 November 1854, the fifth and youngest son of architect Sir George Gilbert Scott and his wife Caroline Oldrid. Scott received private tuitions and was a collector of plants and was a self-taught systematic botanist. From the age of fourteen, he read the works of Joseph Hooker, Alexander Braun, Hugo von Mohl, Carl Wilhelm von Naegeli and Wilhelm Hofmeister.

When he studied Natural Sciences at Christ Church, Oxford, graduating B.A. 1876 (M.A. 1872) he found little encouragement in botany and he studied engineering from 1876 to 1879. After the death of his father in 1878 he became financially independent and resumed his interests in botany. He studied as a postgraduate at Würzburg University in Germany, where he studied under the famous botanist Julius von Sachs, and earned his doctorate. He showed the development of latex vessels in tissues in his 1881 dissertation titled “The Development of the Milk Vessels in Plants”.

== Career ==
In 1882, Scott was appointed assistant to Daniel Oliver, the professor of botany at University College London, and in 1885 as assistant professor in biology (botany) at the Royal College of Science, South Kensington under T. H. Huxley. He was the first lecturer in botany at University College who allowed women to attend his classes. One of his most brilliant students was Harold Wager, who went on to become a Fellow of the Royal Society of London in 1904.

In 1892, Scott was appointed the first keeper of the Jodrell Laboratory at the Royal Botanic Gardens, Kew, a position he held for fourteen years until 1906, under the directorship of the botanist William Turner Thiselton-Dyer, one of his early mentors.

Throughout his life, Scott published many books and papers on botany and palaeobotany in scientific journals. He worked closely with specialists in paleobotany such as William Crawford Williamson and Francis Wall Oliver. He supported the education of women and was the first lecturer in botany at University College who allowed women to attend his classes.

== Honours and awards ==
In addition to his research, Scott provided considerable service to the wider scientific community. He was General Secretary of the British Association from 1900 to 1903, and President of the Royal Microscopical Society from 1904 to 1906. He was the Botanical Secretary of the Linnean Society from 1902 to 1908 and its President from 1908 to 1912. He was President of the Paleobotanical Section of the International Botanical Congress at Cambridge in 1930.

Scott received many awards and honours. He was elected a Fellow of the Royal Society in June 1894 and a member of the Royal Swedish Academy of Sciences in 1916. In 1930 he was elected an Honorary Fellow of the Royal Society of Edinburgh. In 1905 Scott delivered the Wilde lecture to the Manchester Literary & Philosophical Society The Early History of Seed-bearing Plants, as recorded in the Carboniferous Flora

He was awarded the Royal Medal of the Royal Society in 1906, the Gold Medal of the Linnean Society in 1921, the Darwin Medal of the Royal Society in 1926 and the Wollaston Medal of the Geological Society of London in 1928. He was awarded an Honorary Doctorate of Science of Manchester University, a Doctor of Laws in Aberdeen, and Honorary or Corresponding Membership of many foreign academies, including the French Academy of Sciences.

In 1905 Scott delivered the Wilde lecture to the Manchester Literary & Philosophical Society The Early History of Seed-bearing Plants, as recorded in the Carboniferous Flora

== Personal life ==
In 1887 he married Henderina Victoria Klaassen (d.1929), who had been one of his first students (d.1929). She continued to carry out research after their marriage, and also provided illustrations and indexes for some of his books and catalogued his collection of fossil slides. They had seven children, one of whom died in infancy and only four daughters survived him.

The family moved to East Oakley House near Basingstoke, in Hampshire in 1906. He continued to research and publish from there until his death in 1934.

Scott received many academic honors. In 1894 he was elected a member of the Royal Society and in 1906 received the Royal Medal. From 1908 to 1912 he was president of the Linnean Society. In 1926 he was awarded the Darwin Medal and two years later, the Wollaston Medal of the Geological Society.

== Selected publications ==
- Scott, Dukinfield Henry (1894) An Introduction to Structural Biology. (Later editions had 2 volumes). (4th edition - Part 1 Part 2)
- Scott, Dukinfield Henry (1900). Studies in Fossil Botany. A. and C. Black. (2nd edition) (Volume 1, Volume 2, 3rd ed)
- Scott, Dukinfield Henry (1911). The Evolution of Plants. H. Holt and Co.
