= Elizabeth Dale =

British paleobotanist and botanist (1868–1936)

Elizabeth Dale (27 March 1868 – 1936) was a British botanist, paleobotanist, plant pathologist, and author.

She was born in Warrington, Lancashire, the daughter of manufacturing chemist John Gallemore and his wife Clara, née Heys. She was educated by a governess and then at a private school in Buxton, Derbyshire.

After studying at Owens College, Manchester, she studied the natural science tripos at Girton College, Cambridge in 1890–1891.

She worked as an assistant in botany at the Balfour Biological Laboratory for Women at the University of Cambridge from 1897 to 1899. She held a two-year Pfeiffer research studentship, and then spent fourteen years carrying out research at the Cambridge Botanical Laboratory. Her research and publications were mostly on abnormal plant growth.

She worked as a garden steward at Girton, part-time from 1912, and then full-time from 1914–1917. She then retired to the Isle of Wight.

== Written works ==
- Dale, Elizabeth (1900). Scenery and Geology of the Peak of Derbyshire. London: Sampson Low, Marston, and Company, Limited.
- Dale, Elizabeth (September 1901). "On the Origin, Development, and Morphological Nature of the aërial Tubers in Dioscorea sativa, Linn" (PDF). Annals of Botany. 15 (59): 491–501.
- Dale, Elizabeth (January 1912). "On the cause of 'blindness' in potato tubers". Annals of Botany. 26: 129–131.
