= Annie Homer =

Biochemist

- Born: 12 March 1884; West Bromwich, UK
- Died: 1 January 1953 (aged 68)
- Education: University of Cambridge
- Known for: Antitoxin production
- Scientific career
- Fields: Biochemistry;
- Workplaces: University of Cambridge; University of Toronto; Lister Institute

Annie Homer (12 March 1882 – 1 January 1953) was a biochemist at Newnham College, Cambridge, University of Toronto and the Lister Institute. She developed improved methods for large-scale production of antitoxin sera during World War I.

== Personal life and education ==
Annie Homer was born at West Bromwich, UK, on 3 December 1882. Her parents were Joseph and Keziah (née Skidmore) Homer. After attending King Edward VI High School for Girls in Birmingham, Homer went in 1905 to Newnham College of the University of Cambridge to study chemistry. She took the Natural Sciences Tripos in 1904 and 1905, gaining Class I, chemistry, Part II but women were not awarded degrees by this university at that time. However, she was able to obtain an MA degree from Trinity College, Dublin based on her Cambridge studies. She was awarded a DSc by Trinity College in 1913 based on research she undertook at Newnham College.

She died 1 January 1953.

== Career ==
From 1909 - 1914 Homer was at Newnham College, initially as Assistant Lecturer and Demonstrator in Physical Science (1909 - 1910) and then Demonstrator in Chemistry. She was supported financially by a Bathurst research studentship and fellowship (1907–10), a Benn Levi fellowship (1910) and a Beit Memorial fellowship (1911 - 1914). In 1914, she moved to the University of Toronto in Canada to work as a Demonstrator in Biochemistry and was a Medical Research Fellow. She also acted as Assistant Chemist at the Dominion Experimental Farm, Ottawa. In 1914 she became assistant director of the Antitoxin Laboratories, Toronto, and this led to her return to the UK with an appointment at the Lister Institute and research facilities at the Physiological Institute, University of London.

While at Newnham College, Homer published on physical organic chemistry, including organic chemistry syntheses that involved the Friedel-Crafts reaction. Initially, she was advised by Humphrey Jones and also John Edward Purvis. The latter was a spectroscopist and assistant to George Downing Liveing at University of Cambridge but developed an interest in public health, becoming Lecturer in Chemistry and Physics in their application to Hygiene and Preventive Medicine in 1908. Her research developed a focus on reactions of the indole group in the aminoacid tryptophan and some of her publications continued to be cited into the twenty-first century.

In Canada, she re-focused her research onto antitoxic sera, which resulted in innovative methods to manufacture high quality antitoxin protein fractions from serum. Separating unnecessary proteins from the antibodies used to counter infections in medical practice was important to increase both potency of antitoxin doses and to reduced the incidence of serum sickness. Her return to the UK in 1914 was to provide expertise in large scale, commercial production of this therapeutic protein which was necessary during the First World War.

In the 1920s she changed her research field again to become involved in development of oil, potash and other mineral resources in Palestine. She, and an engineer R. H. Bicknell, were members of a consortium aiming to exploit salts, particularly potash, from the Dead Sea that was financed and headed by W H Tottie who a director in London for the Canadian Merchants and General Trusts. This came to a halt in 1927 when Tottie died unexpectedly, despite a positive response to their bid for a British government tender. However, she continued during the Second World War, when she acted at times on behalf of the British Government, and until her death.

== Publications ==
She published 37 scientific papers, divided between topics in chemistry (prior to 1914) and those on antitoxins (1914 - 1920). These included:

- Homer, Annie (1907) The action of aluminium chloride on naphthalene. Journal of the Chemical Society 91 (1) 1103–1114
- Homer, Annie and Purvis, John Edward (1910) The absorption spectra of dinaphthanthracene and its hydro-derivative compared with the absorption spectra of its isomerides. The Journal of the Chemical Society Transactions 97 1155–1158
- Homer, Annie (1913) The condensation of tryptophane and other indole derivatives with certain aldehydes. Biochemical Journal 7 (2) 101 - 115
- Homer, Annie (1915) A method for the estimation of the tryptophane content of proteins, involving the use of baryta as a hydrolyzing agent. Journal of Biological Chemistry 22 (2) 369–389
- Homer, Annie (1915) A spectroscopic examination of the color reactions of certain indol derivatives and of the urine of dogs after their administration. Journal of Biological Chemistry 22 (2) 345–368
- Homer, Annie (1916) An improved method for the concentration of antitoxic sera. Journal of Hygiene 15 (3) 388 - 400.

== Awards and honours ==
She became a Fellow of the Royal Society of Chemistry in 1918.
