= Frederick Bernheim =

American biochemist

Frederick Bernheim (1905-1992) was an American biochemist. He was one of the founding members of the Duke University medical school and became James B. Duke Professor of Pharmacology. He published over 120 articles on biological pharmacology.

Bernheim was born in New Jersey, and attended the Ethical Culture Fieldston School, graduating a year after J. Robert Oppenheimer. He went on to attend Harvard University where he formed a close friendship with Oppenheimer. Bernheim credited Oppenheimer with inspiring his later career in research. He graduated from Harvard University in 1925. He went to the United Kingdom in the autumn of 1925 to study biochemistry as a research student at King's College, Cambridge. It was in the University of Cambridge Biochemistry Laboratory that he met his future wife Mary Hare.

Bernheim discovered in 1940 that aspirin could affect the metabolism of the tuberculosis bacillus, a discovery which was used by Jorgen Lehman in his development of para-aminosalicylic acid as the first synthetic antimicrobial against tuberculosis.

Frederick and Mary both worked in Germany for several years and then after working briefly at Johns Hopkins took faculty positions in the newly founded Duke University School of Medicine in 1930. Frederick Bernheim became editor of the Proceedings of the Society for Experimental Biology and Medicine and a Fellow of the American Association for the Advancement of Science and the New York Academy of Sciences.

Frederick and Mary Bernheim had two children.
