= Kammatograph =

Early (1900) system for short movie films

The Kammatograph was a system for motion pictures patented in 1898 in the UK by Leonard Ulrich Kamm and marketed to the general public from 1900. It used a circular glass plate rather than a spool of film for the images.

== Inventor ==
Leo (Leonard) Ulrich Kamm (born 1861) invented and patented the Kammatograph system for moving pictures. It was one of the products of his company, Kamm and Co that he had founded in 1892 to manufacture electrical goods and camera equipment. He used patents to protect his intellectual property. He was granted a British patent on 3 December 1898 for "Improvements in apparatus for photographing and exhibiting cinematographic pictures" that describes the Kammatograph.

== Technical aspects ==
A kammatograph was made of Spanish mahogany, aluminium, and gun metal, was 14 x 13.5 x 3.5 inches (35.5 x 34.3 x 8.9 cm) in size and weighed about 8 lbs (3.6 kg).

The photographic images were arranged on a 12 inch (30.5 cm) glass disc in a spiral, providing a distinction from other systems. The glass disc was coated with a photosensitive gelatine emulsion. To record images, the lens cap was removed and the disc was rotated in front of the lens by hand. It could record 300 or 550 images and a gauge at the back of the camera showed how many exposures were left. The disc was removed from the camera in a dark room and processed to produce a negative in the same way as contemporary photographic plates. A circular positive print could be made from the negative as a contact print. This could then be used in the camera to show the pictures, after changing the shutter and lens stop. From a distance of 20 feet (6 m) it could project a 6 foot (1.8 m) square image onto a screen. When complete, each film could last 30 – 45 seconds.

== Commercial aspects ==
The kammatograph was one of the product of L Kamm and Co., scientific engineers and manufacturers, 27 Powell Street, Cromwell Road, London E.C. The company produced kammatographs and all the necessary accessories.

Two selling-points were that it did not require flammable celluloid film and that it was easier for amateur photographers to use at home than other contemporary systems. A significant disadvantage was that each recording had to be short and editing was not possible.

== Impact on cinematography ==
A kammatograph was used around 1901 by William Norman Lascelles Davidson and Benjamin Jumeaux in experiments with colour which led to Kinemacolor which was the first commercially successful colour motion film process.

Henderina Scott pioneered time-lapse photography of plants in 1903 using a kammatograph. Kamm and Co. Ltd. assisted her in optimising the equipment for time-lapse.
