= Mary Gladys Thoday =

Welsh botanist, suffragist, and peace activist (1884 – 1943)

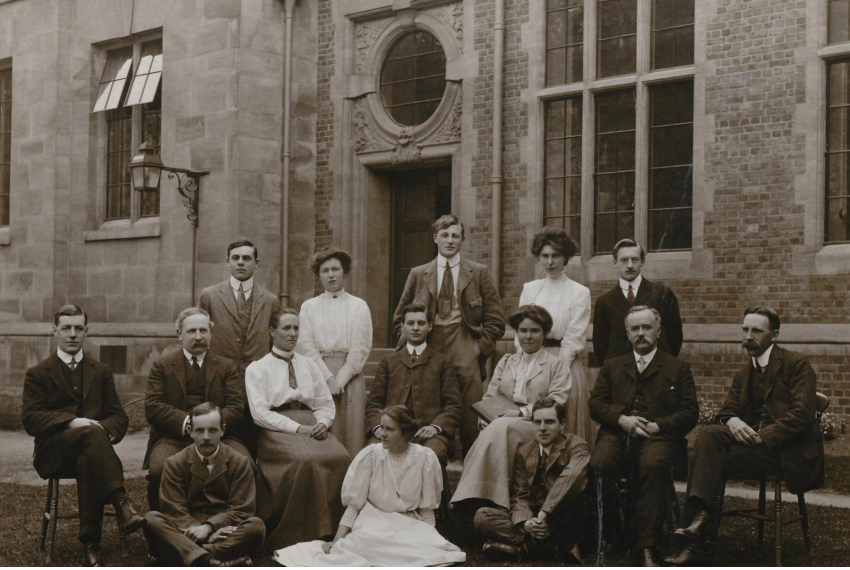
Mary Gladys Sykes (back row, second from left) with members of the Marshall Ward Society in 1909.

Mary Gladys Thoday (née Sykes, 1884 – 1943), sometimes known as Gladys or Gwladys Thoday, was a Welsh botanist, suffragist, and peace activist in Britain and South Africa.

== Early life and education ==
She was born Mary Gladys Sykes 13 March 1884 in Chester, the elder of two daughters of cotton broker John Sykes and his wife Mary, née March. She grew up in Croes Howell, Gresford, Denbighshire.

Educated by governess and at the Queen’s School, Chester, she gained a double first class pass in the natural science tripos at Girton College, Cambridge.

== Botany ==
Thoday was a Bathurst student and research fellow at Newnham College, Cambridge and a member of the University’s Marshall Ward Society. She worked at the Balfour Biological Laboratory for Women as an assistant in botany (1908–9), demonstrator in physiology (1909–10), and demonstrator in vegetable biology (1910–1).

Described in her obituary in Nature as 'a keen and versatile botanist,' she published prolifically on cytology and genetics.

In 1910, she married her fellow Marshall Ward Society member, the botanist David Thoday. They had four sons, one of whom, John Thoday, would become Balfour Professor of Genetics at the University of Cambridge.

In 1911 she was appointed Honorary Research Fellow at the University of Manchester and contributed to the research programme and teaching there.

In 1919, the family moved to Cape Town, South Africa, where she completed Henry H. W. Pearson’s unfinished book on Gnetales. On their return to Britain in 1923, Thoday was appointed honorary lecturer at the University College of North Wales in 1925.

== Activism ==
Thoday was a prolific public speaker and letter-writer on the subjects of disarmament, women’s suffrage, and female genital mutilation in South Africa, who spoke face-to-face with Prime Minister Jan Smuts on the subject of female suffrage during her time in South Africa. Disarmament was the main cause of her later life.

In 1926, she led the North Wales contingent of a Women’s International League for Peace and Freedom Peace Pilgrimage. In 1932, she travelled to the Geneva World Disarmament Conference to deliver a Memorial taken from 135 meetings held in north Wales which demanded the end of arms exports. She represented Britain at the Ninth World Congress of the Women’s International League for Peace and Freedom in Czechoslovakia in 1937, where she spoke on 'Colonial Questions.'

=== Positions held ===
- Honorary secretary of the Manchester District Federation of Women’s Suffrage Societies
- Vice-president of the Women’s Enfranchisement Association of the Union of South Africa
- Honorary secretary of the North Wales Women’s Peace Council
- Executive Member of the Women’s Peace Crusade

== Later life and death ==
During World War II, Thoday and her husband hosted refugees from Europe in their home.

She died on 9 August 1943.
