= Edith Gertrude Willcock =

English biochemist (1879–1953)

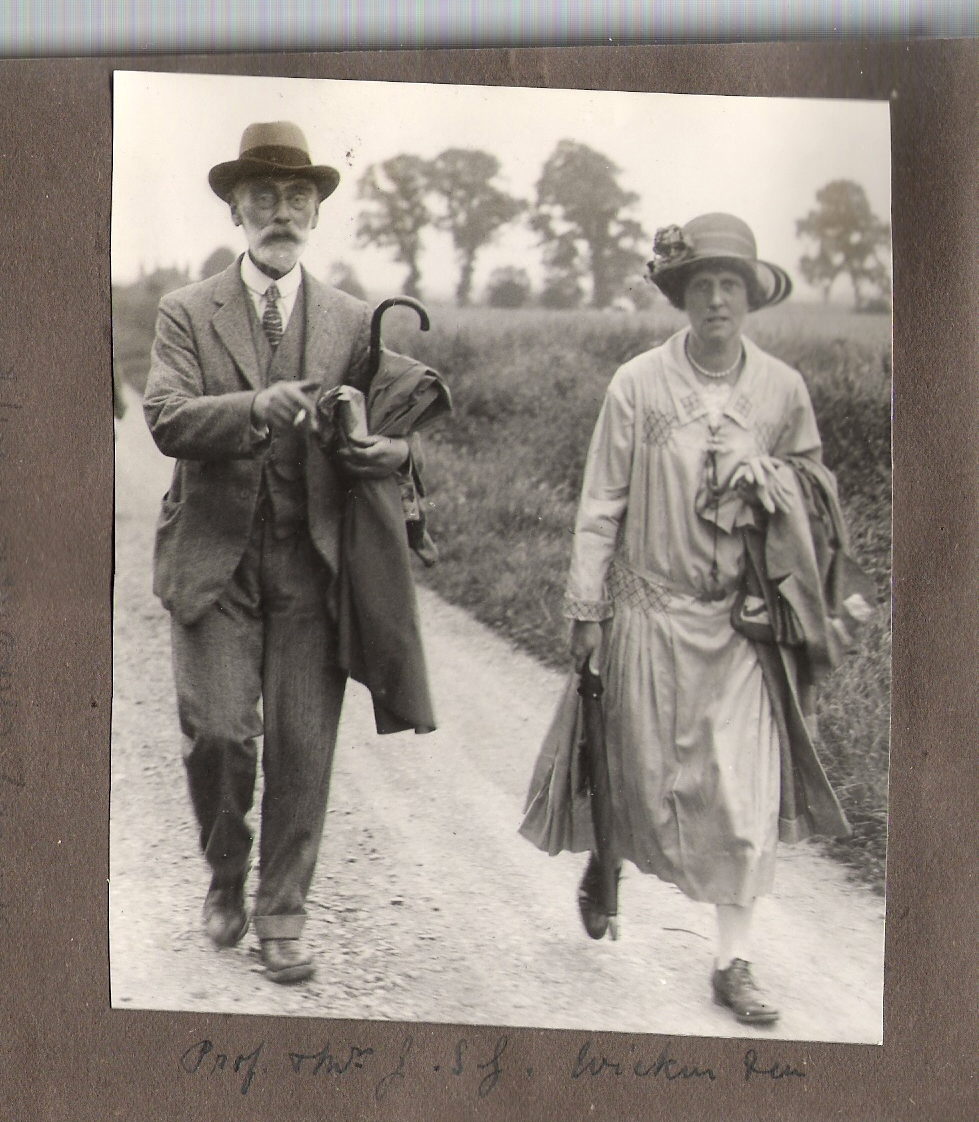
Edith and her husband in the 1930s

Edith Gertrude Willcock (1879–1953) was an English nuclear physicist and biochemist. After publishing on radium, she contributed to research into the role of amino acids in diet.

== Early life ==
Edith Willcock was born at Albrighton on 7 January 1879 to solicitor Robert Willcock and his wife Emma. She was educated at the King Edward VI High School for Girls in Birmingham, known for its science syllabus.

== Scientific career ==
Willcock studied at Newnham College, Cambridge from 1900, gaining a second class pass in Part I in 1902 and a first class pass in Part II in 1904. She received a Bathurst studentship to continue her research in 1904 – 5 and was appointed a research fellow at Newnham in 1905 – 9. Since Cambridge did not award degrees to women until 1948, she was one of the 'steamboat ladies' who travelled to Trinity College, Dublin to receive their degrees, gaining a DSc in 1906.

During her undergraduate studies, she did research with William Bate Hardy on radium, and published a solo paper which represents one of the first studies to show the damaging effects of radiation on animal life.

Inspired by her 'realisation of the existence of vast unexplored tracts and the unfolding of immense opportunities for research' in lectures by Frederick Gowland Hopkins, she carried out research with him from 1905 – 9. By studying the effects of adding or subtracting tryptophan to the diet of mice, they established in 1906 that some amino acids were essential to diet and could not be substituted for others. This research led to Hopkins' discovery of vitamins.

== Agricultural consultancy and later life ==
In 1909, Willcock married zoologist John Stanley Gardinar. They had two daughters and lived in Bredon House, which was built for them in 1914, and was later given to Wolfson College, Cambridge.

During World War I, Edith worked as a local consultant for the British Ministry of Agriculture on the raising of rabbits and poultry, on which she wrote leaflets for distribution, and an advisor on the cultivation of oysters.

After her marriage, Edith focused on her other interests, as a watercolour artist, singer, and children’s author.

She died in Cambridge on 8 October 1953.

== Publications ==
- (with W.B. Hardy) 'On the oxidizing action of the rays from radium bromide as shown by the decomposition of iodoform,' Proceedings of the Royal Society of London 71 (1903): 200–204
- 'Radium and animals,' Nature 69 (1903): 55
- 'The action of the rays from radium upon some simple forms of animal life,' Journal of Physiology 30:5–6 (1904): 449–454
- 'The action of radium rays on tyrosinase,' Journal of Physiology 34:3 (1906): 207–9
- 'The importance of individual amino-acids in metabolism,' Journal of Physiology 35:1–2 (1906): 88–102
- 'Crystalline egg-albumin,' Journal of Physiology 37:1 (1908): 27–36
