= Edith Rebecca Saunders =

British geneticist (1865–1945)

Edith Rebecca Saunders FLS
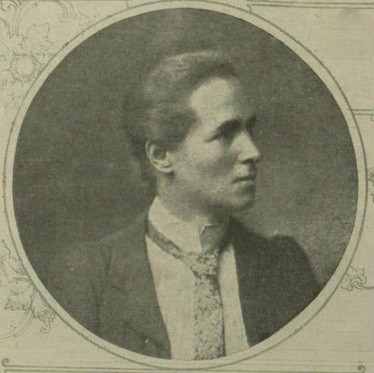
- Born: 14 October 1865; Brighton, England
- Died: 6 June 1945 (aged 79); Cambridge, England
- Scientific career
- Fields: Genetics, plant anatomy
- Author abbrev. (botany): E.R.Saunders

Edith Rebecca Saunders FLS (14 October 1865 – 6 June 1945) was a British geneticist and plant anatomist. Described by J. B. S. Haldane as the "Mother of British Plant Genetics", she played an active role in the re-discovery of Mendel's laws of heredity, the understanding of trait inheritance in plants, and was the first collaborator of the geneticist William Bateson. She also developed extensive work on flower anatomy, particularly focusing on the gynoecia, the female reproductive organs of flowers.

== Biography ==
Saunders was born on 14 October 1865 in Brighton, England. She was educated first at Handsworth Ladies' College and in 1884 she entered the female-only Newnham College, Cambridge. There, she attended both Part I (in 1887) and II (in 1888) of the Natural Sciences Tripos.

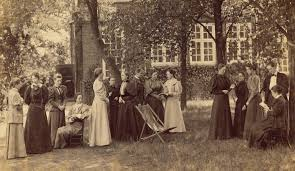
Discussions in 1896 at Newnham College. Marion Greenwood is second from left and Edith Saunders is at right

She continued to post-graduate research, and served as a demonstrator at the Balfour Biological Laboratory for Women between 1888 and 1890 (where students from Newnham and Girton colleges received preparation for the Natural Sciences Tripos). She was the last director of that Laboratory between 1890 and 1914. She was also director of studies at Girton College (1904–1914) and Newnham College (1918–1925).

She was appointed a fellow of the Royal Horticultural Society from which she received the Banksian Medal in 1906. In 1905 she was elected a Fellow of the Linnean Society of London, later serving on its council (1910 - 1915) and as vice-president during 1912- 1913.

In 1920 she was the president of the botanical section of the British Association for the Advancement of Science. She also served as president of the Genetics Society, between 1936 and 1938.

During World War II she served as a volunteer helping the Allied forces. She died soon after returning to Britain, in 1945, after suffering injuries in a bicycle accident.

== Research ==
Saunders' earlier research focused on genetics. Many of her genetic experiments led to her and William Bateson defining important terms like "allelomorphs" (nowadays referred to as alleles), heterozygote and homozygote. Furthermore, together with Bateson and Reginald Punnett she co-discovered genetic linkage.

She also did extensive work in plant anatomy, particularly concerning gynoecia, having published several articles on the subject (noteworthy is her series of articles on "Illustrations of Carpel Polymorphism" published in the journal New Phytologist between 1928 and 1931).

== See also ==
- Dorothea Pertz
