= Helen Klaassen =

English physicist (fl. 1893–1919)

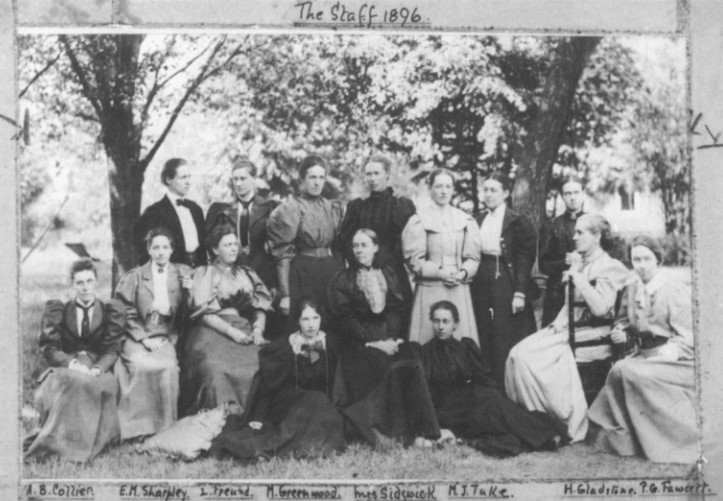
Staff of Newnham College in 1896, including Helen Klaassen (back row, third from left)

Helen Gertrude Klaassen (26 June 1865 – 31 May 1951) was an English physicist.

She was the daughter of Hendericus Klaassen, a geologist who had emigrated from Prussia in the 1840s. Her sister was botanist Henderina Scott.

She attended the University of Cambridge, carrying out electrochemical experiments at the Cavendish Laboratory in the late 1880s and 1890s. At the suggestion of J. J. Thompson, she studied electric resistance curves in sulphuric acid.

She worked as lecturer in physics at Newnham College, Cambridge, and as a demonstrator in physics at the Balfour Biological Laboratory for Women in 1891–1901.

Her most notable work was a collaboration with Alfred Ewing on the magnetic properties of iron, published by the Royal Society of London in 1893.

Klaassen was a member of the National Union of Scientific Workers and also took an interest in nursing.

== Select publications ==
- (with James Alfred Ewing) 'Magnetic qualities of iron,' Philosophical Transactions of the Royal Society of London 184 (1893) 985–1039
- 'Change of phase on reflexion at the surface of highly-absorbing media,' London, Edinburgh, and Dublin Philosophical Magazine and Journal of Science 44 (1897) 349–355
