= Mary Bernheim =

British biochemist

- Born: Mary Lilias Christian Hare; 28 June 1902; Gloucester, England
- Died: 19 November 1997 (aged 95)
- Education: University of Cambridge
- Known for: The discovery of the enzyme system of tyramine oxidase
- Spouse: Frederick Bernheim (m. 1928)
- Scientific career
- Fields: Biochemistry
- Workplaces: Newnham College, Cambridge; Duke Medical School

Mary Lilias Christian Bernheim (née Hare; 28 June 1902 – 19 November 1997) was a British biochemist best known for her discovery of the enzyme tyramine oxidase, which was later renamed as monoamine oxidase. Bernheim discovered the enzyme system of tyramine oxidase during her doctorate research at the University of Cambridge in 1928, and her research has been referred to as "one of the seminal discoveries in twentieth century neurobiology".

== Early life and education ==
Bernheim was born under the name Mary Lilias Christian Hare in Gloucester, England on 28 June 1902. However, she was referred to as "Molly" by those around her. As a child, Bernheim was raised in India. She obtained higher degrees of BA, MA, and PhD from the University of Cambridge in England. After finishing her undergraduate, Bernheim received the Bathurst Studentship to work on her PhD research in the Department of Biochemistry at the Newnham College, Cambridge.

== Discovery of monoamine oxidase ==
As a doctoral student, Bernheim was aware of the limited research which had been conducted on the catabolism of tyramine, a naturally occurring monoamine compound obtained from the amino acid tyrosine. Keeping in mind the availability of newly enhanced techniques for the analysis of oxidative processes, she decided to study the manner in which the addition of tyramine affected oxygen uptake in tissues.

During the course of her work, Bernheim used rabbit liver extracts and obtained the enzyme by adding kaolin to the liver extracts at pH 6.5. Following this, crude tyramine was procured by heating tyrosine in the presence of the catalyst diphenylamine. The extracted enzyme was added to tyramine, in the presence of water and buffer, and the Barcroft technique was used to observe the amount of oxygen consumed by tyramine. She discovered that the oxidation of tyramine did take place, with the observation that one atom of oxygen was absorbed per molecule of tyramine present. This observation indicated the presence of an enzyme system within the studied liver extracts, which Bernheim named tyramine oxidase, since it was involved in the oxidation of tyramine.

In addition to the discovery of the enzyme system, Bernheim observed several unique properties of the tyramine oxidase system. She noted that the methylene blue dye used in the experiment was not reduced. This observation indicated that the tyramine oxidase system, unlike other enzyme systems, was not able to use the dye as a hydrogen acceptor. Additionally, the oxidative process within this enzyme system was seen to be resistant to the addition of cyanide. This observation showed that the tyramine oxidase system was an exception to Warburg's statement, which claimed that direct oxidation could not occur unless atmospheric oxygen was activated by iron. Instead, the system was seen to produce hydrogen peroxide, indicating that molecular oxygen acted as a hydrogen acceptor in the system. Bernheim also detected that the enzyme facilitated the occurrence of deamination in tyramine, along with the process of oxidation.

Prior to her discovery, tyramine had not been studied extensively from a biochemical perspective.

=== Importance of monoamine oxidase discovery ===
Breakdown of Norepinephrine, which belongs to the catecholamine family. Monoamine oxidase is depicted in the blue box on the left.

Following her discovery, Bernheim predicted that tyramine oxidase was important for the oxidative deamination of tyramine, thus allowing for the detoxification of extra amines absorbed from the intestines. This prediction was proven correct by later research, which showed that patients treated with monoamine oxidase inhibitors had toxic reactions to the consumption of food rich in tyramine. However, subsequent research indicated that the enzyme was involved in the oxidative deamination of additional monoamine neurotransmitters, including Catecholamines and histamine, as shown in the figure. The enzyme was eventually renamed as monoamine oxidase, indicating that the enzyme catalysed the oxidative deamination of the class of monoamines.

After the discovery of monoamine oxidase (MAO), numerous studies were conducted to determine the biological importance of monoamines. Due to the significance of MAO in the inactivation of monoamine neurotransmitters, MAO dysfunction is believed to cause several psychiatric and neurological disorders, including depression and schizophrenia. Upon the discovery that the MAO inhibitor iproniazid resulted in mood elevation, and thus could be used as an effective anti-depressant, there was a marked increase in pharmacological research on drugs regulating monoamine activity.

Despite the fact that MAO inhibitors were eventually replaced by tricyclic antidepressants and serotonin reuptake inhibitors in the treatment of depression, there is still enormous interest in the function of MAO. The discovery of different MAO subtypes has led to research on selective MAO subtype inhibitors, which have been shown to exhibit reduced side effects and greater specificity during inhibition. These MAO subtype inhibitors are being used in the treatment of geriatric depression and as potential replacements for MAO reuptake inhibitors. Additionally, the discovery of MAO in blood platelets has led to research on the function of platelet enzyme activity as an indicator of MAO dysfunction.

== Duke Medical School faculty ==
In 1930, Bernheim was appointed as a member of the original faculty of Duke Medical School. When she began at Duke, Bernheim was notably one of few women in the Department of Biochemistry, either as a student or faculty member. She eventually became a full professor at Duke, and was teaching graduate students, medical students, and nursing students. During her time at Duke, the number of women in the medical school classes increased significantly from one or two women in a class of seventy-five students to women comprising more than half of the class. At the time of her death in 1997, she was the final surviving member of the original faculty of Duke Medical School.

== Personal life ==
While at Cambridge, Hare met fellow graduate student Frederick Bernheim, and eventually married him on 17 December 1928. Over the course of her career, Bernheim had authored over sixty papers.

Beyond biochemistry, Bernheim had interests in botany and flying. She published a book "A Sky of My Own," in which she details her journey into the field of flying, and describes her experience as a pilot and flight instructor.

Bernheim was recognised for her contributions to scientific research, and she was honoured at the Ciba Foundation symposium held in 1975 for her discovery of monoamine oxidase. Although she retired in 1983, she remained in a teaching position until her death on 19 November 1997 at the age of 95.
