= Helen Sheldon =

British headmistress and educationist

- Born: 15 October 1859; Handsworth
- Died: 16 May 1945 (aged 85); Holloway

Helen Maud Sheldon (15 October 1859 – 16 May 1945) was a British headmistress of Sydenham High School and an educationist.

== Life ==
Sheldon was born in Handsworth in 1859 where her father was the vicar. or 1860 She had two brothers who survived and four sisters. Her parents Ann (born Sharp) and John Sheldon arranged for their daughters to attend Handsworth Ladies' College and remarkably three of the girls went on to higher education in Cambridge. Lilian Sheldon went to Newnham College and became a noted zoologist and two others to Girton College. Her brother Gilbert was paralysed as a child but became a successful writer. Helen studied mathematics at Girton and took the tripos but she was not awarded a degree (because she was not a man).

She had always wanted to go into education and from 1881 to 1884 she was teaching at the Girls’ Public Day School Trust (GPDST) in Kensington School. In 1884 she returned to Girton to lecture in mathematics but she decided she did not know enough maths and in 1887 she returned to GPDST teaching at Blackheath High School.

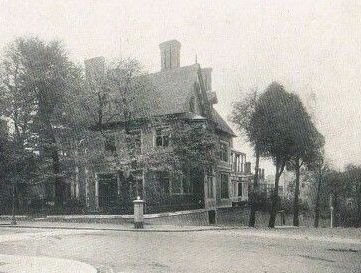
Sheldon's Sydenham High School in 1900

In 1898 she became the head of the Girls’ Public Day School Trust (GPDST) in Dover. The school had been founded in 1888 and she was the third and penultimate head (the school closed in 1908). In 1901 Sheldon became the Sydenham High School's second head teacher. The school had been created by the GPDST in 1887 with an initial school roll of twenty. The first head had been Ms. I Thomas.

Sheldon made changes at her new school. She created the school's first orchestra. She introduced the idea of senior girls becoming prefects and she divided the school into houses. Sheldon's family had left her money and she used some of this to offer her school interest free loans. A minor addition was a school pavilion that was created from an old tram, but the major additions was to the school grounds. Using the money she lent to the school, the campus was increased by the purchase of adjoining land. In 1910 Sheldon obtained permission for the school's buildings to be increased by the use of two former residential houses. Sheldon retired in 1917, and she was succeeded by Ms. A. F. E. Sanders.

Sheldon died in 1945 in Holloway.
