= John Thoday =

British geneticist

John Marion Thoday FRS (30 August 1916 – 25 August 2008) was a British geneticist. He was the son of the botanists David Thoday and Mary Gladys Thoday. He was Arthur Balfour Professor of Genetics at Cambridge University between 1959 and 1983 and was elected a Fellow of the Royal Society in 1965.

Thoday was born in Chinley, Derbyshire, and educated at Bootham School, York, followed by University College of North Wales at Bangor, and then Trinity College, Cambridge. During World War II he served in the RAF as a photographic intelligence officer.

His research from 1947 has been largely concerned with the causes and functions of intraspecific genetic variation, on the nature of continuous genetic variation and on the effects of selection on such variation. He has published an important thesis on the meaning of biological progress in evolution and the role of genetic variation in determining long term fitness. He has pioneered a method for the location on chromosomes of genes mediating continuous variation, and showed (contrary to accepted theory) that the genes at different loci affected the quantitative character in qualitatively different ways. He has pioneered experiments into disruptive selection (selection in the same population for both extremes and against intermediates), and (again contrary to theoretical expectation), showed such selection could be extremely effective, increasing variance, establishing and maintaining polymorphisms, and, if the selected individuals were allowed to choose their mates, dividing the population into two partially isolated parts, something which is a step towards speciation.
