= Kathleen Halpin =

British public servant and feminist (1903–1999)

Kathleen Halpin OBE CBE
- Born: 19 November 1903; Forest Hill, London, England
- Died: 4 January 1999 (aged 95); London, England
- Education: Sydenham High School
- Occupations: public servant and feminist
- Employer(s): Ministry of Health, United Nations Relief and Rehabilitation Administration
- Organization(s): Women's Gas Council, National Society for Women's Service, Women's Voluntary Service, Soroptimist International, St. Bartholomew's Hospital

Kathleen Mary Halpin OBE CBE (19 November 1903 – 4 January 1999) was a British public servant and feminist. She was involved in organisations including the British Red Cross Society, the Girl Guides Association, Order of St John, Women's Gas Council, National Society for Women's Service, Women's Voluntary Service, Soroptimist International, United Nations Relief and Rehabilitation Association and St. Bartholomew's Hospital.

== Biography ==
Halpin was born in 1903 in Forest Hill, London, and was the eldest of four children. She was educated at Sydenham High School. Whilst at school she was involved with the British Red Cross Society, the Girl Guides Association and the Order of St John.

Halpin lived in Paris, France, for a year after leaving school, then completed secretarial training as a shorthand typist when she returned to England. She was employed as a secretary with Encyclopaedia Britannia and the Architects Journal, then worked as private secretary in the 1930s to John Simon, 1st Viscount Simon whilst he was Foreign Secretary, and his wife Kathleen Simon, Viscountess Simon.

In 1935, Halpin established the first branch of the Women's Gas Council in Harrogate, and became the council's organising secretary. The organisation aimed to popularise gas for domestic cooking and 21 local branches had been established by the end of the year. In 1938, she attended the Seventh International Management Congress, in Washington, D.C. to represent the organisation.

Halpin became Regional Administrator of the Women's Voluntary Service for Civil Defence (WVS) in the London Civil Defence Region under Stella Isaacs, Marchioness of Reading, taking over the role from Lindsey Huxley. In this role she administered the evacuation of children from London at the beginning of World War II. She was so successful that she was appointed National Administrator for the entire country. She was appointed OBE in recognition of this service in the 1941 Birthday Honours. When the WVS Benevolent Trust was founded in 1953, Halpin was one the seven trustees, alongside Margaret Charles, Frances Clode, Enid Cubitt, Doreen Harris, Stella Isaacs and Alice Crawford Johnston. When the WVS Association was formed in 1973, Halpin was elected as the founding Chairman of the Association.

Towards the end of the war, Halpin was seconded to the Ministry of Health. She became an adviser for the United Nations Relief and Rehabilitation Association, sitting on the Committee of Welfare and advising on war refugees from Europe. She also served as a Governor of St. Bartholomew's Hospital from 1948 to 1974. She was appointed CBE in 1953.

Halpin joined Soroptimist International and was president of the Federation of Soroptimist Clubs of Great Britain and Ireland (SIGBI) from 1959 to 1960. She chartered daughter clubs in Britain, Barbados, Jamaica, Rhodesia, South Africa and Trinidad.

Halpin was an early member of the National Society for Women's Service (now the Fawcett Society), setting up the youth wing in the 1920s. She became chair from 1967 to 1971, was involved with their Women's Employment Federation, and worked on campaigns including equal pay, the provision of childcare for working mothers and pension rights. She remained an active member into her eighties and nineties.

Halpin was interviewed in 1977 for Brian Harrison's Suffrage Interviews project, titled Oral evidence on the suffragette and suffragist movements: the Brian Harrison interviews (number 138) and in1990 for the National Life Story Collection oral history project. She was also interviewed for the book From Poor Law to community care: The development of welfare services for elderly people 1939-1971, which was published in 1998.

Halpin died in 1999.
