= David Thoday =

Botanist

Professor David Thoday
- Born: 5 May 1883
- Died: 30 March 1964 (aged 80)
- Children: John Thoday
- Awards: Fellow of the Royal Society (1942)
- Scientific career
- Institutions: University of Cape Town; University College of North Wales
- Author abbrev. (botany): Thoday

David Thoday FRS (5 May 1883 – 30 March 1964) was a botanist.

== Career ==
Thoday was Harry Bolus professor of botany, University of Cape Town and later professor at the University College of North Wales 1923–1949. As a botanist, his work is denoted by the author abbreviation Thoday when citing a botanical name.

== Awards and honours ==
He was elected a Fellow of the Royal Society in 1942. His nomination reads

Professor of Botany in the University College of North Wales, Bangor. Distinguished for researches in plant physiology and causal anatomy, in which he has carried out work over a wide field. In his earlier work he made important contributions to our knowledge of photosynthesis and respiration. This was followed by investigations on the water relations of plants in which particular attention was paid to the problems of microphylly. His later work has dealt with growth and differentiation in Compositae, and more especially with succulent members of this family, as exemplified in particular by 'Kleina articulata'. He has also made a number of contributions to taxonomy, including a revision of the genus 'Passerina'.

== Personal life ==
He married fellow botanist and activist Mary Gladys Sykes in 1910. Their son was the geneticist John Thoday.
