= Sydenham High School =

Sydenham & Dulwich Girls

Location
- 19 Westwood Hill; Sydenham, London, SE26 6BL; 51°25′38″N 0°03′46″W

Information
- Type: Private day school
- Established: 1887
- Department for Education URN: 100757 Tables
- Head teacher: Ms Antonia Geldeard
- Gender: Girls
- Age: 4 to 18
- Enrolment: 726
- Website: School site

Sydenham & Dulwich Girls is a private day school for 4- to 18-year-old girls located in London, England. Sydenham & Dulwich Girls was founded by the Girls’ Public Day School Trust in 1887. Since then, the original school roll of 20 pupils has grown to 724 girls. The school is separated into the senior and junior schools, each with a separate site on Westwood Hill in Sydenham. The school changed its name from Sydenham High School to Sydenham & Dulwich Girls in 2026 to coincide with the opening of its new Sixth Form, The Foundry, built as an extension to the original 1889 stable block, and the innovation and maker spaces forming the new entrance building, Fairlight, named after one of the school's original buildings.

== History ==
The school was created by the Girls’ Public Day School Trust in 1887 with an initial school roll of twenty and Ms I Thomas as the founding head.

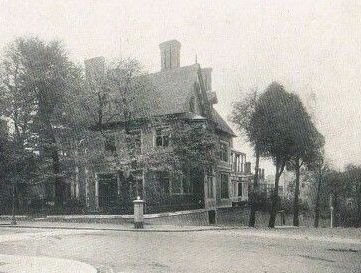
Sydenham High School's first building in 1900

In 1901 the mathematics graduate Helen Sheldon became the school's second head teacher. She created the school's first orchestra. She introduced the idea of senior girls becoming prefects and she divided the school into houses. Sheldon's family had left her money and she used some of this to offer her school interest free loans. A minor addition was a school pavilion that was created from an old tram, but the major additions was to the school grounds. Using the money she lent to the school the campus was increased by the purchase of adjoining land. In 1910 Sheldon obtained permission for the school's buildings to be increased by the use of two former residential houses. Sheldon retired in 1917.

In April 1934, the school moved to Horner Grange, a former house built for diamond magnate William Knight in 1884, where he lived until his death in 1900. The premises subsequently became a hotel before the school bought the freehold. It was damaged by fire in 1997, but the building was restored.

The school's original Anglo Saxon motto, Nyle ye drede, means "fear nothing" and is adopted by the school as a whole.

== Headmistresses ==
- Miss Irene Thomas, 1887-1901
- Miss Helen Sheldon, 1901-1917
- Miss Sanders, 1917-1930
- Miss Smith, 1931-1941
- Miss Yardley, 1942-1966
- Miss Hamilton, 1966-1987
- Mrs Baker, 1988-1999
- Dr Lodge, 1999-2002
- Mrs Kathryn Pullen, 2002-2016
- Mrs Katharine Woodcock, 2017-2022
- Ms Antonia Geldeard, 2022–Present

== Notable former pupils ==
- G. E. M. Anscombe, philosopher
- Kathleen Halpin (1903–1999), public servant and feminist
- Elly Jackson, lead singer with pop group La Roux
- Emily Joyce, actress
- Gertrude Leverkus (1899–1976), architect
- Margaret Lockwood (1916-1990), actress
- Sophie McKenzie, author of books such as Blood Ties
- Khadijah Mellah (b.2000) first competitive jockey to wear the hijab and winner of the Magnolia Cup at Goodwood
- Sandy Powell, BAFTA-winning costume designer
- Florence Rawlings, musician
- Kathleen Shackleton (1884-1961), artist
