= Dorothea Pertz =

British botanist (1859–1939)

- Born: Dorothea Frances Matilda Pertz; 14 March 1859; London, England
- Died: 6 March 1939 (aged 79); Cambridge, England
- Education: Newnham College, Cambridge
- Occupation: Botanist

Dorothea Frances Matilda Pertz FLS (14 March 1859 – 6 March 1939) was a British botanist. She co-authored five papers with Francis Darwin, Charles Darwin's son. She was made a Fellow of the Linnean Society, among the first women admitted to full membership.

== Biography ==
Dora Pertz was born in London on 14 March 1859 to Georg Heinrich Pertz and his second wife, Leonora Horner, daughter of Leonard Horner, who was a progressive intellectual and an adamant supporter of Darwinism, a fact he noted in his final address. She grew up in a family where women were well-educated and intellectually active; one of her aunts was the botanist Katharine Murray Lyell, who was a biographer of Charles Lyell, her brother-in-law. Through family connections she met many prominent naturalists including Darwin. Pertz spent most of her youth in Berlin, where her father was Royal Librarian, though they visited England each year. After her father's death in 1876, Pertz moved to Florence with her mother. Later she returned to England and in 1882 she was admitted to Newnham College, Cambridge. She spent a year in Italy before returning to Cambridge in 1884. The next year she took part one of the Natural Sciences Tripos, with her subjects including botany, and gained second-class honours. Once women were allowed titular degrees, she would take her MA in 1932.

Pertz subsequently undertook research into plant physiology, working under Francis Darwin, a reader at the university. (Note: The son of Charles Darwin.) From 1892 to 1912 they jointly published five papers; during this period she also collaborated with William Bateson, and she published a paper with him concerning inheritance in Veronica. She also produced two papers independently. In 1905 she was made a fellow of the Linnean Society, among the first women admitted as full members, though she did not take part in the movement advocating for women to be fellows. After Darwin's retirement, Pertz was encouraged by Frederick Blackman to undertake research on meristematic tissue, but after a year observing germinating seeds her results were inconclusive. She abandoned research, possibly over disappointment, though Agnes Arber claimed "she came to recognize that the plant physiology of the twentieth century was developing on lines widely divergent from those on which she had been educated and that it demanded a grasp of mathematics, physics, and chemistry, which she did not possess."

After Pertz had given up research, at Blackman's suggestion she worked on indexing German literature on plant physiology, including the journals Biochemische Zeitschrift and Zeitschrift für Physiologische Chemie. Despite the difficulty of the task, she completed the index up to the year 1935. Between 1923 and 1936 she provided illustrations for her friend Edith Rebecca Saunders' series of papers on floral anatomy, and both the paper and illustrations were highly respected. Pertz did much of her work unpaid out of passion for science, and she never had a formal appointment at Newnham or the university. She also performed charity work, including working as a masseuse at a convalescent hospital in Cambridge during the First World War.

After several years of illness Dora Pertz died in Cambridge on 6 March 1939. She was cremated and buried at Brookwood Cemetery.

== Published works ==
In chronological order:

- Pertz, Dorothea F. M. (1884). "On the disposal of the nutlets in certain labiates". 1. London: 8. reprinted from Pertz, Dorothea F. M. (October 1894). "On the disposal of the nutlets in certain labiates". Natural Science. 5 (32). London.

And with Francis Darwin:

- Darwin, Francis; Pertz, Dorothea F. M. (October 1892). "On the artificial production of rhythm in plants". Annals of Botany. os-6 (3): 245–264. doi:10.1093/oxfordjournals.aob.a090678.
- Darwin, Francis; Pertz, Dorothea F. M. (January 1903). "On the artificial production of rhythm in plants, with a note on the position of maximum heliotropic stimulation". Annals of Botany. os-17: 93–106. doi:10.1093/oxfordjournals.aob.a088917.
- Darwin, Francis; Pertz, Dorothea F. M. (1904). "On the distribution of statoliths in Cucurbitaceae". Annals of Botany. os-18 (4): 453–454. doi:10.1093/oxfordjournals.aob.a088983.
- Darwin, Francis; Pertz, Dorothea F. M. (1904). "Notes on the statolith theory and geotropism. I. Experiments on the effects of centrifugal force. II. The behavior of tertiary roots". Proceedings of the Royal Society. 73 (488–496): 477–90. doi:10.1098/rspl.1904.0065. JSTOR 116804.
- Darwin, Francis; Pertz, Dorothea F. M. (1905). "The position of maximum geotropic stimulation". Annals of Botany. os-19 (4): 569–570. doi:10.1093/oxfordjournals.aob.a089030.
- Darwin, Francis; Pertz, Dorothea F. M. (1912). "On a new method of estimating the aperture of stomata". Proceedings of the Royal Society B. 84 (569): 136–154. doi:10.1098/rspb.1911.0058.
