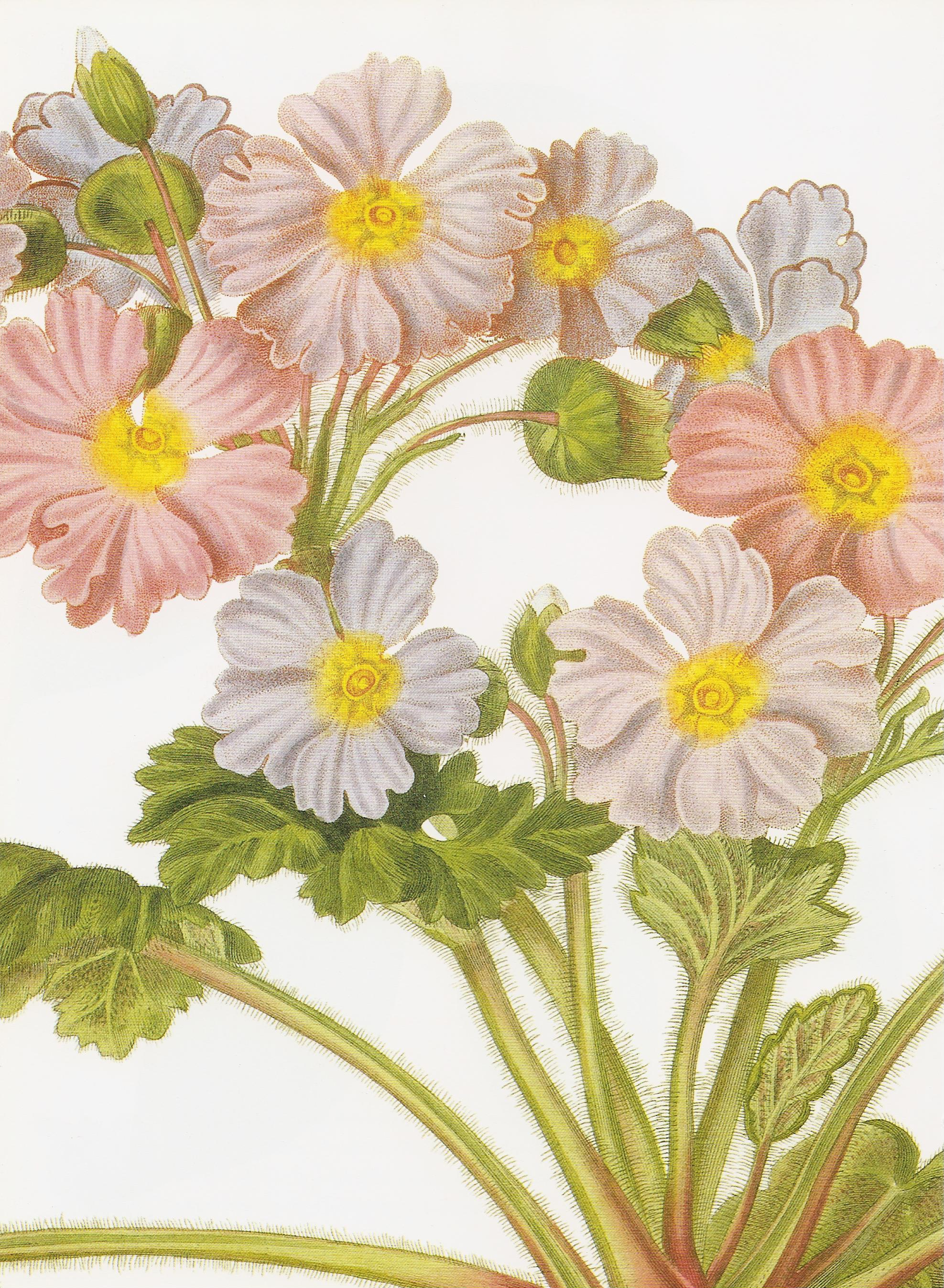
- Primula sinensis, a hand-coloured engraving from John Lindley's Collectanea botanica (1821) of a plant both named and drawn by Lindley

Scientific classification
- Kingdom: Plantae
- Clade: Embryophytes
- Clade: Tracheophytes
- Clade: Angiosperms
- Clade: Eudicots
- Clade: Asterids
- Order: Ericales
- Family: Primulaceae
- Genus: Primula
- Species: P. sinensis

Binomial name
- Primula sinensis Sabine ex Lindley, Coll. Bot. t. 7. 1821. non Loureiro (1790).

Synonyms
- Auganthus praenitens Link; Oscaria chinensis Lilja; Primula mandarina Hoffmannsegg; P. praenitens Ker Gawler; P. semperflorens Loiseleur-Deslongchamps ex Steudel; P. sertulosa Kickx f. Primulidium sinense (Sabine ex Lindley) Spach.

= Primula sinensis =

Species of flowering plant

Primula sinensis (Chinese: 藏报春; pinyin: zàngbàochūn), or the Chinese primrose, is a flowering plant species in the genus Primula.

Primulin is an anthocyanin found in P. sinensis.
