= Adam Sedgwick (zoologist) =

British zoologist

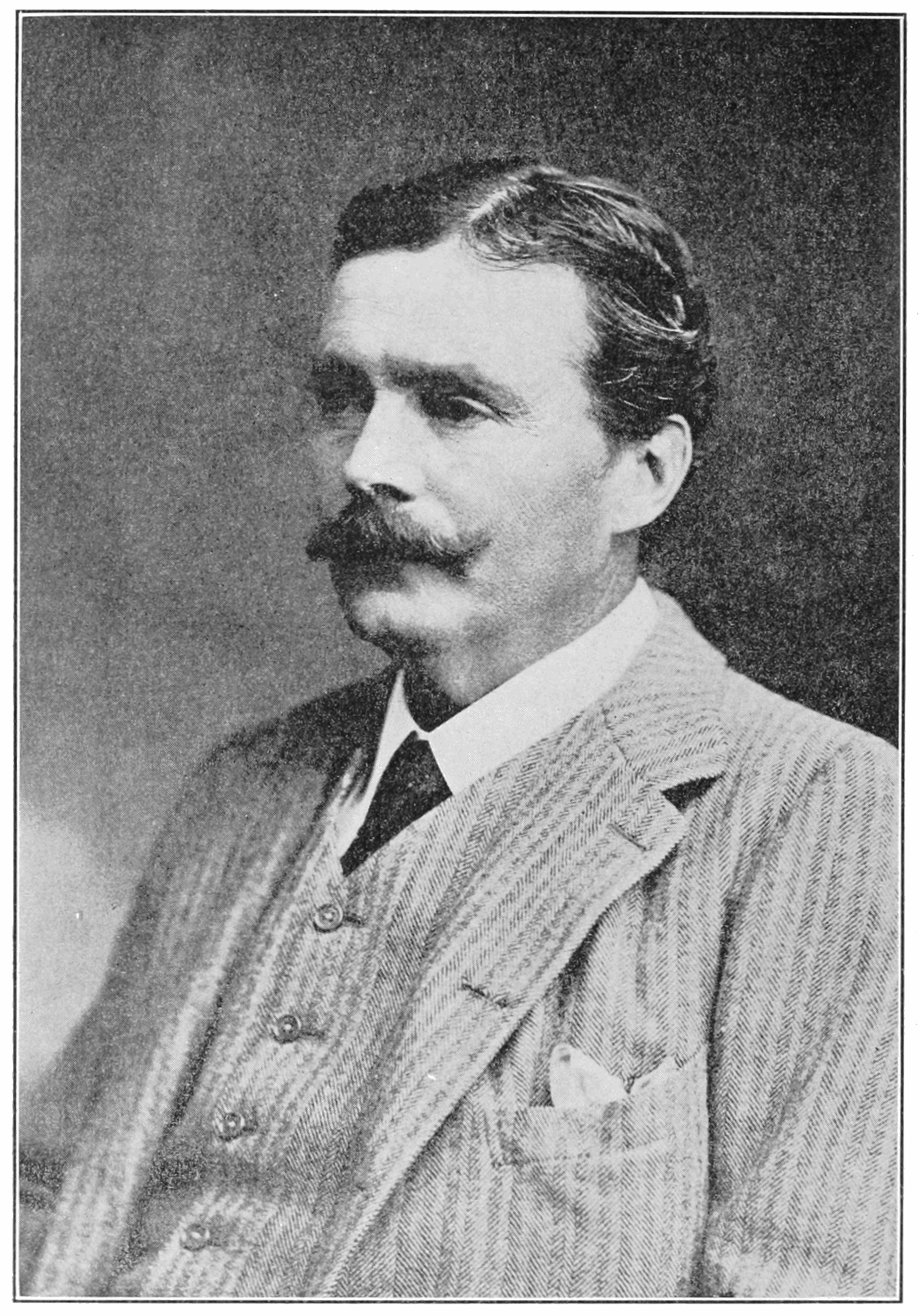
- Born: 28 September 1854; Norwich, Norfolk
- Died: 27 February 1913 (aged 58); London
- Scientific career
- Fields: Zoology
- Institutions: Cambridge University, Imperial College of London

Adam Sedgwick FRS (28 September 1854 – 27 February 1913) was a British zoologist and Professor of Zoology and Comparative Anatomy, Imperial College, London. He was a great nephew of the geologist Adam Sedgwick.

== Early life ==
Sedgwick was born in Norwich, Norfolk in 1854, the son of Rev Richard Sedgwick, vicar of Dent, Yorkshire and his wife Mary Jane, daughter of John Woodhouse of Bolton-le-Moors, Lancashire. He was the great-nephew of Rev. Adam Sedgwick (FRS 1821). He married Laura, daughter of Captain Robinson of Armagh.

He was educated at Giggleswick School; Marlborough College; King's College London; and later at Trinity College, Cambridge, where he earned his BA in 1878, and an MA in 1881.

== Career ==
He worked as a fellow of Trinity College, Cambridge (1880).

He was a tutor there (1897–1907). He became a lecturer in animal morphology at Cambridge University (1883–1890). He worked as reader in animal morphology (1890–1907). He became a professor of zoology and comparative anatomy (1907–1909). He served as professor of zoology at Imperial College, London (1909–1913). He became chairman of the Geological Survey of Great Britain. He was elected a fellow of the Royal Society in 1886. He was a member of the Athenaeum Club.

Sedgwick contributed articles to the 1911 edition of Encyclopædia Britannica. He also wrote A Student's Textbook of Zoology in three volumes, published in 1898, 1905 and 1909.
