= W. H. Gaskell =

British physiologist (1847–1914)

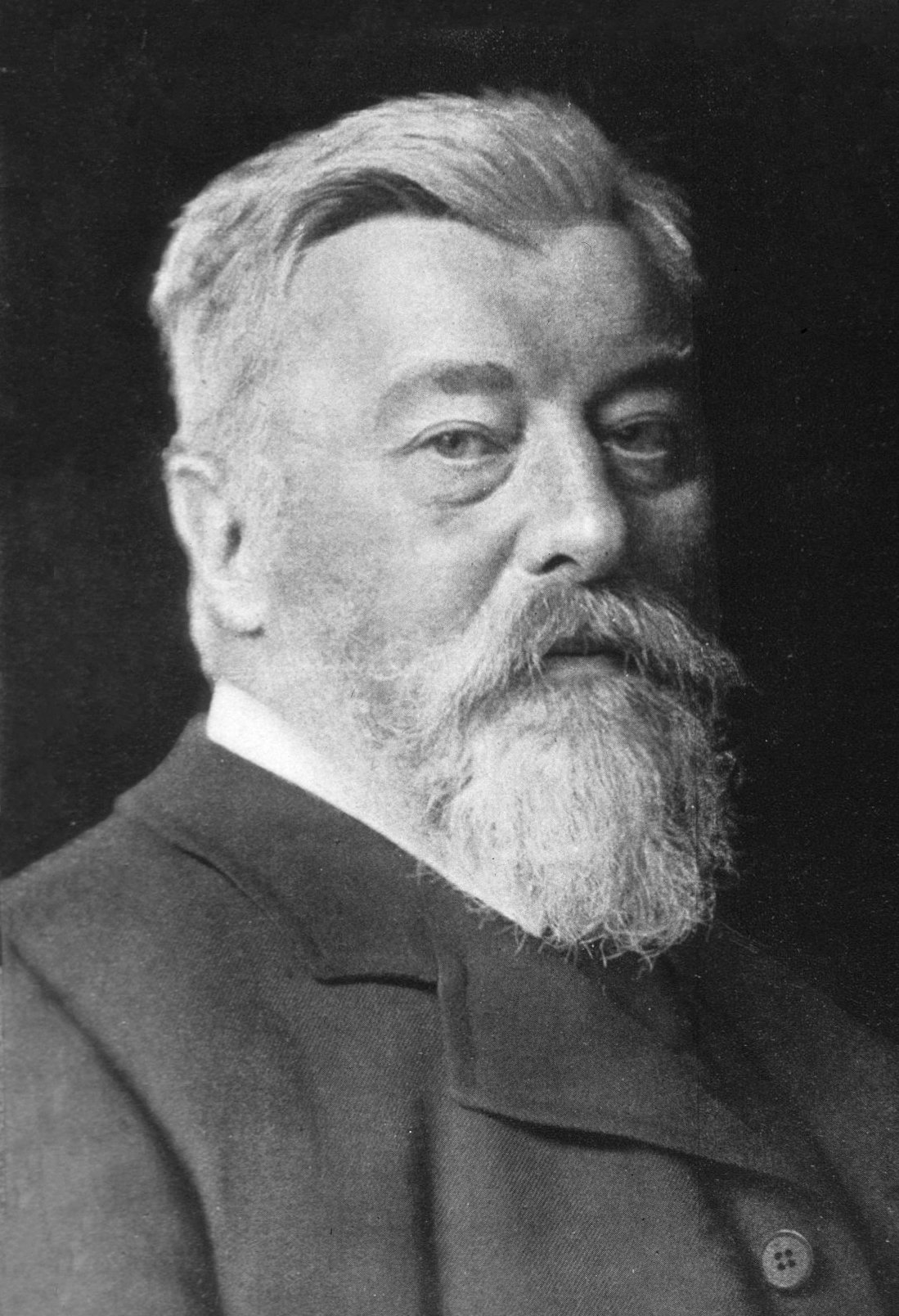

Walter Holbrook Gaskell FRS (1 November 1847; Naples – 7 September 1914; Great Shelford) was a British physiologist.

== Early life ==
The son of barrister John Dakin Gaskell, he was educated at Highgate School and Trinity College, Cambridge, receiving his BA as a wrangler in 1869 and becoming a Fellow of Trinity Hall.

== Career ==
He worked in the Physiological Laboratory of the University of Cambridge, focusing on the physiology of the heart and the vascular and nervous systems. His research was central to the understanding of cardiac physiology. Key discoveries included the sequence of cardiac contraction, dual autonomic control of the heart, introduction of the concept of heart block and the experimental demonstration of the myogenic origin of the heartbeat. His research also laid the foundations for investigation into cardiac arrhythmias. He also made progress in mapping the sympathetic nervous system. In 1881, he was the first to describe the effects of extracellular pH on cardiac and vascular tissues.

He was elected a Fellow of the Royal Society in 1882 and gave their Croonian lecture of that year. In 1889 he won their Royal Medal for his contributions both to cardiac physiology and to the anatomy and physiology of the sympathetic nervous system.

He wrote "The Origin of the Vertebrates", published by Longmans, Green, and Co., London, in 1908, proposing a since-rejected connection between the vertebrates and eurypterid arthropods.

== Private life ==
In 1875 Walter Gaskell married Catherine Sharpe Parker, first cousin of the London architect Horace Field. They had four daughters and a son, John Foster Gaskell (1878-1960), named after a neighbour and friend, the physiologist Michael Foster. The family settled near Cambridge where he remained for the rest of his life, residing first at Grantchester and later at Great Shelford, where he built a hilltop home, The Uplands, designed by Horace Field, opposite the hill on which stood Michael Foster's home, Nine Wells House. During his youth, he engaged in rowing, cricket, tennis and swimming. Later he enjoyed yachting, fishing, whist and bridge. Throughout life, he always took a somewhat leisurely course during both work and play activities. His main hobby was gardening, and he converted a large area of his 15 acres of the Gog Magog Hills into a charming terraced garden. After Gaskell's death at The Uplands, his remaining family continue to live there until 1961, when the house and estate was auctioned on behalf of the executors of the late Dr John Foster Gaskell and Miss Gaskell MBE. In 1990 a major fire destroyed the house and its ruins still stand today in dense woodland on land now owned by a Cambridge College.

== Bibliography ==
- JNL (1914–1915) Proc Roy Soc Lond B Biol Sci 88:xxvii–xxxvi (Obituary)
- Silverman, ME; Upshaw, CB (2002). "Walter Gaskell and the understanding of atrioventricular conduction and block". J Am Coll Cardiol. 39 (10): 1574–1580. doi:10.1016/s0735-1097(02)01839-9. PMID 12020482.
