= Primulin (anthocyanin) =

Names
- IUPAC name (2S,3R,4S,5R,6R)-2-[5,7-dihydroxy-2-(4-hydroxy-3,5-dimethoxyphenyl)chromenylium-3-yl]oxy-6-(hydroxymethyl)oxane-3,4,5-triol chloride
- Other names Malvidin 3-galactoside Malvidin-3-galactoside chloride Malvidin-3-O-galactoside; Malvidin-3-O-galactoside chloride 3-(Galactosyloxy)-5,7-dihydroxy-2-(4-hydroxy-3,5-dimethoxyphenyl)-1-benzopyrylium chloride Primulin Yellow

Identifiers
CAS Number	30113-37-2
3D model (JSmol)	Interactive image
ChemSpider	85201
ECHA InfoCard	100.045.490
PubChem CID	94409
UNII	MB4022065G
CompTox Dashboard (EPA)	DTXSID90952524
- InChI: InChI=1S/C23H24O12/c1-31-14-3-9(4-15(32-2)18(14)27)22-16(7-11-12(26)5-10(25)6-13(11)33-22)34-23-21(30)20(29)19(28)17(8-24)35-23/h3-7,17,19-21,23-24,28-30H,8H2,1-2H3,(H2-,25,26,27)/p+1/t17-,19+,20+,21-,23-/m1/s1 Key: PXUQTDZNOHRWLI-XSEKTIEYSA-O; InChI=1/C23H24O12/c1-31-14-3-9(4-15(32-2)18(14)27)22-16(7-11-12(26)5-10(25)6-13(11)33-22)34-23-21(30)20(29)19(28)17(8-24)35-23/h3-7,17,19-21,23-24,28-30H,8H2,1-2H3,(H2-,25,26,27)/p+1/t17-,19+,20+,21-,23-/m1/s1 Key: PXUQTDZNOHRWLI-IRUYQYSKBI
- SMILES: COc1cc(cc(c1O)OC)c2c(cc3c(cc(cc3[o+]2)O)O)O[C@H]4[C@@H]([C@H]([C@H]([C@H](O4)CO)O)O)O

Properties
Chemical formula	C_{23}H_{25}ClO_{12} C_{23}H_{25}O_{12}^{+}
Molar mass	528.89 g/mol (chloride); 493.43 g/mol
- Except where otherwise noted, data are given for materials in their standard state (at 25 °C [77 °F], 100 kPa). verify (what is ?) Infobox references

Primulin is an anthocyanin. It is the 3-galactoside of malvidin. It can be found in Primula sinensis.

The first crystalline form of this pigment was prepared by Rose Scott-Moncrieff in about 1930. This was the first crystalline anthocyanin pigment ever identified. This was possible because of her insight into linking genetics with chemistry.
