= Lilian Sheldon =

English zoologist

- Born: May 1862; Handsworth, West Midlands, England
- Died: 6 May 1942 (aged 79–80); Exmouth, Devon, England
- Education: Handsworth Ladys College; Newnham College
- Occupation: zoologist
- Known for: morphology of Cynthia Rustica

Lilian Sheldon (May 1862 – 6 May 1942) was an English zoologist.

== Life ==
Sheldon was born in Handsworth in 1862 where her father was the vicar (one source says 1860). She had two brothers who survived and four sisters. Her parents Ann (born Sharp) and the Reverend John Sheldon arranged for their daughters to attend Handsworth Ladies' College and remarkably three of the girls went on to higher education in Cambridge. Lillian Sheldon went to Newnham College in 1880 and two others to Girton College. Her elder sister Helen Sheldon became a notable headteacher at Sydenham.

Lilian took two Natural Sciences Tripos examinations in Cambridge in 1883 and 1884.

Sheldon conducted research on the development of the newt embryo with Alice Johnson and, as well, on the anatomy and morphology of Cynthia rustica (now called Styela rustica) and Peripatus. Her results were published in the Quarterly Journal of Microscopical Science. Sheldon also contributed a section on Nemertines to volume 2 of the Cambridge Natural History series. She worked at the College as a demonstrator on morphology from 1892 to 1893, and lectured on comparative anatomy from 1893 to 1898. She was a College associate from 1894 to 1906. She retired from academia around 1898.

She later published a number of articles on traditional Devonshire buildings in the Transactions of the Devonshire Association. During World War I, she worked for YMCA in Birmingham, where she was one of the earliest women drivers in the country.

In 1931 her brother Gilbert Sheldon died. He had suffered from paralysis nearly all his life but he had published a number of books and travelled widely with his six sisters. It was Lilian and Walter de la Mare who wrote the introduction to his last work published in 1932.

She also served on the local hospital committee at Exmouth. Sheldon died there at the age of 80.
