= Marion Bidder =

English physiologist and writer

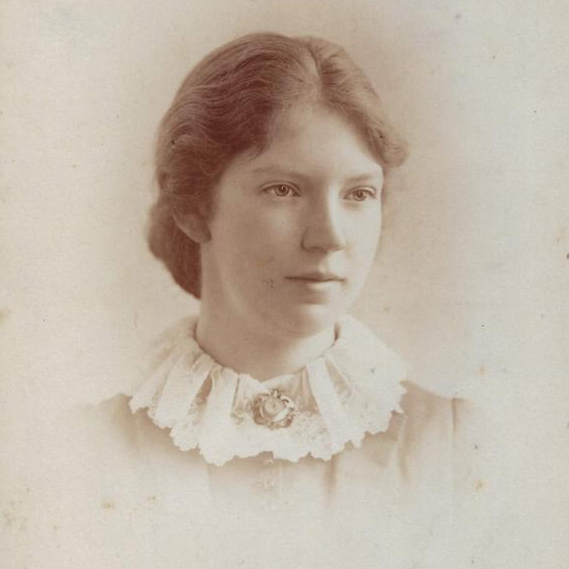
- 1880 photo by JH Lord
- Born: Marion Greenwood; 26 August 1862; Yorkshire, England, U.K.
- Died: 25 September 1932 (aged 70)
- Other name: Marion Greenwood Bidder
- Education: Girton College, Cambridge; Newnham College, Cambridge
- Scientific career
- Fields: Physiology; Domestic economy
- Workplaces: Balfour Laboratory; Girton College, Cambridge

Marion Bidder (née Greenwood) (26 August 1862 – 25 September 1932) was an English physiologist and one of the first women to do independent research in Cambridge. For nearly a decade, she was in charge of the Balfour Laboratory in Cambridge and in 1895 she was the first woman to speak about a paper she had written at a Royal Society meeting.

== Early life and education ==
Born in Myton, Hull, she was the sixth child and her family moved to Oxenhope in 1869. Her parents were Agnes (born Hamilton) and George Greenwood. Her father was a lay preacher and a shipping agent. She attended Bradford Girls' Grammar School and won a scholarship to attend Girton College when she was 17 years old. She was one of the first women to be allowed to graduate with a double first in the natural sciences tripos. She completed botany, physiology and zoology in 1882 with more physiology in 1883. She began to study digestion after being inspired by the physiologist Michael Foster. She was one of the first women deciding her own research and she was the first winner of the Gamble Prize in 1888 for her dissertation.

While doing research at Newnham College, she wrote papers on the gastric glands of pigs, effects of nicotine on invertebrates, and the physiology of protozoa. These papers appeared in the Journal of Physiology.

== Career ==
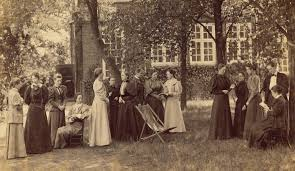
Discussions in 1896 at Newnham College. Greenwood is second from left and Edith Saunders is at right

Starting in 1888, she acted as both a lecturer and director of studies in biology as well as a tutor for female physiology students at Newnham College. Greenwood lead the Balfour Laboratory from 1890. When she married marine biologist George Parker Bidder and gave up the position 11 years later in 1899, it took four people to replace her. They moved to Plymouth, where they stayed until 1902, when they returned to Cambridge. They had two daughters; one, Anna McClean Bidder (1903–2001), was a zoologist and academic.

After marrying, Bidder continued to publish works, however they were on the subject of domestic economy. In 1901, Domestic Economy in Theory and Practice was published, to which Bidder contributed on the theoretical and scientific aspects of the subject.

== Later life ==
Bidder was president of the Cambridge Women's Liberal Association and was passionate about women becoming involved in town councils. She also held the position of vice-chairman of the Cambridgeshire Voluntary Association for Mental Welfare. She was a governor of both Homerton Teacher Training College in Cambridge and of Girton College. She served as governor of Girton College until her death, she died of tuberculosis on September 25, 1932.

== See also ==
- Timeline of women in science
