= Richard Stone (disambiguation) =

Sir Richard Stone (1913–1991) was a British economist.

Richard Stone may also refer to:

- Richard Stone (priest), Archdeacon of Lewes, 1393–1395
- Richard Stone (fencer) (1926–2006), Australian Olympic fencer
- Richard Stone (politician) (1928–2019), American politician and diplomat
- Richard Stone (anti-racism activist) (1937–2024), British medical doctor and activist
- Charlie Stone (rugby league) (Richard Stone, 1950–2018), English rugby league player
- Richard Stone (painter) (born 1951), British portrait painter
- Richard Stone (composer) (1953–2001), American composer
- Richard Stone (lutenist) (born 1960), American lutenist
- Richard Stone (sculptor) (born 1974), British sculptor and painter
- Richard Stone (born 1975), member of the Taiwanese rock band Mayday
- Ricky Stone (born 1975), American baseball pitcher
