= Kenneth Cracknell =

British theologian (1935–2022)

Kenneth R. Cracknell (19 June 1935 – 26 October 2022) was a British theologian who specialised in interfaith dialogue and the Christian theology of religions.

Cracknell has written many articles and books on interfaith dialogue and other subjects, including Towards a New Relationship (1985), Justice Courtesy and Love (1994), An Introduction to World Methodism (2005), and In Good and Generous Faith (2005). A festschrift, A Great Commission (2000) edited by Martin Forward, Stephen Plant and Susan White, includes scholarly articles by numerous friends and colleagues on the occasion of Cracknell's 65th birthday. He has pioneered a sensitive and respectful Christian approach to the religious Other while dealing skillfully with Bible verses that for some demand a total condemnation of other religions and the conversion of their followers. Wesley S. Ariarajah, former director of inter-religions relations at the World Council of Churches describes Cracknell's discussion as "a probing exegesis of the apparently exclusive verses." Defining mission as witnessing to the compassionate presence of God in the world modeled by the life and suffering of Jesus Christ, Cracknell does not reject conversion from one faith to another but is more concerned with movement towards a deeper relationship with God and with loving action in God's world to reduce pain, poverty and prejudice. His Justice, Courtesy and Love examines the contributions of Christian scholars including missionaries whose encounter with the religious Other deepened their own understanding of the nature of God's concern for the restoration of human and planetary health. His career included pioneering the interfaith relations work of the British Council of Churches, teaching at University of Cambridge and at Brite Divinity School, Texas from where he retired in 2007 as Distinguished Professor of Theology and Global Studies.

== Education ==
Cracknell obtained a B.D. degree from the Universities of London (1959) and Oxford (1995). He was educated at the University of Oxford (BA, MA) and the University of Leeds (Post Graduate Certificate with distinction in Religion) and at the Richmond Methodist College, London where he trained for ministry.

== Career ==
A British subject and Methodist minister, he began his career teaching in Nigeria through the Methodist Church Overseas Mission Division, then served as minister in Loughborough and as chaplain to Loughborough University from 1967 to 1978. He served as the first Director for Interfaith Relations in the British Council of Churches from 1978 until 1987 at first under the chairmanship of David Brown, Bishop of Guildford and (from 1983) of Bishop Jim Thompson. He has been associated with the World Council of Churches as a member of the Dialogue Sub-Unit, later the Office on Inter-religious Relations. Cracknell's scholarship is widely cited. Marcus Braybrooke, historian of interreligious relations, refers to Cracknell as "the influential Methodist thinker" in his contribution to Islam and Global Dialogue (2005) (edited by Roger Boase).

=== The Four Principles of Dialogue ===
At the BCC, one of Cracknell's most important contributions was developing and promoting the "four principles of interfaith dialogue". He redacted these from the 13 principles contained in the WCC's Guidelines on Dialogue with People of Living Faiths and Ideologies (1979). They are:

1. Dialogue begins when people meet each other;
2. Dialogue depends on mutual trust and mutual understanding;
3. Dialogue makes it possible to share in service to the community;
4. Dialogue becomes the medium of authentic witness.

Several member churches including the Church of England endorsed these before Cracknell left the BCC in 1987.

=== Promoting Christian Reflection ===
Cracknell founded the Association for Ministerial Training in a Multifaith Society, which held annual conferences attended by upwards of 200 clergy over several years, exploring how theological education ought to respond to the reality and challenges of multiculturalism. As national conversation in the United Kingdom about citizenship, identity and belonging and the place of the nation's Christian heritage (and established Church) developed, Cracknell began the process that resulted in the publication of an important Christian contribution to this discussion, Belonging to Britain: Christian perspectives on religion and identity in a plural society (1991) (edited by Roger Hooker and John Sargant) to which he also contributed.

=== Cracknell's missiology ===
The fact that the interfaith committee at the British Council of Churches was at the time located within the Mission Division and was mainly funded by Missionary Societies made reflection on mission an almost inevitable aspect of the director's role. Cracknell's sustained interest in Christian mission is indicated by the title chosen for the 2000 volume, A Great Commission, edited by Martin Forward, in honor of his scholarly contribution. Cracknell's 1985 book, Towards A New Relationship written while serving at the BCC explored many of the Biblical passages, such as John 14: 6 and Acts 4: 2 that Christian cite to defend an exclusive view of salvation as found only through an explicit, with the lips confession of Jesus as Lord and Savior. Cracknell argued that salvation is to be found "in the Name" but that "His Name is the Name because it affords the means by which human beings share in the grace and love that is the nature of God himself" His linguistic skill with the Biblical languages often disarmed critics, who saw his approach as a betrayal of Christian truth but who relied on English translations of the two testaments. Ariarajah says that "without denying any of the positive aspects of mission", Cracknell challenges Christians to re-think their attitudes to Others free from "prejudices stemming from the assumption of cultural superiority." Hugh Goddard refers to a "detailed study" of the Protestant World Missionary Conference of 1910 in Cracknell (1994) in which he "concluded that in some ways nineteenth century Christian thinking, including that of some missionaries, was readier than subsequent Christian thought to contemplate continuity rather than discontinuity between Christianity and other religions". "In that sense", says Goddard, Cracknell suggests that "under the influence of Barth and Kraemer the twentieth century has gone backwards rather than forwards." Cracknell was awarded his Oxford BD for this book.

=== Networking ===
Travelling widely throughout the United Kingdom and Ireland, in Europe and beyond promoting interfaith dialogue and visiting situations where Christian found themselves compelled to think about their relations with the religious Other, Cracknell was concerned to learn from their experiences but to also challenge a narrow perception of the meaning of faith, which is always God's gift and never a human work. His own experience in Africa led him to view Western Christianity as too tied to cultural assumptions such as those of racial and civilizational superiority, from which it needs to be liberated. Ariarajah also praises Cracknell's exploration of the role of nations in God's purposes, when he asks if the cultures and faiths of all nations are not of value and worth, why did God permit their proliferation?

Working within the member churches of the BCC and outside the churches, Cracknell networked groups of committed individuals from across the faiths, encouraging and nurturing the formation of interfaith encounter groups. Many later affiliated with the Interfaith Network for the United Kingdom, a body that was launched just after he left office. Cracknell developed close personal relations with leading members of the various faith communities in the UK. A defender of religious liberty, he also helped to establish INFORM, a state-funded bureau for information on New Religious Movements including some that tend to be demonized, such as Scientology and the Unification Church.

=== As Journal founder ===
Cracknell was founder-editor of the journal Discernment (from 1986 until 1990), which continued to be published through until 1998.

== Wesley House, Cambridge ==
After 10 years at the BCC, Cracknell moved to Wesley House, Cambridge where he held the Michael Gutteridge Chair in Theology and was Senior Tutor, continuing at the same time to work closely with the interfaith desk of the World Council of Churches and other interfaith groups. During his tenure in Cambridge, Cracknell also served as President of the Theological Federation (1988 to 1995). In much of his writing, Cracknell drew on the scholarship of Wilfred Cantwell Smith whose approach allows Others to define themselves, resisting the temptation to impose preconceived assumptions such as that any claim to experience God outside of Christ must be false. He was succeeded at Wesley by Martin Forward who had directed interfaith relations for the British Methodist Church and who was also involved in the work of the BCC committee.

== Texas Christian University ==
After eight years in Cambridge, he took a position as Professor of Theology and Global Studies (later appointed Distinguished Professor) at Brite Divinity School, Texas Christian University, Fort Worth, Texas. At the same time, Cracknell's wife, Susan White, began teaching at Brite as well. While at Brite, he produced his reader on Wilfred Cantwell Smith, his book on World Methodism (as co-author) and his Good and Generous Faith as well as articles and reviews. Cracknell also oversaw a summer study abroad program for Brite students through Wesley House at University of Cambridge. He retired in 2007. He moved to Vermont to live there, where he operated Sutton Books, a book shop. He continued to lecture and to lead seminars on interfaith relations at various colleges and universities during his retirement.

== Bibliography ==
- Braybrooke, Marcus (2005) "Christians and People of Other Faiths", 215-226 in Boase, Roger (ed) Islam and global Dialogue: religious pluralism and the pursuit of peace, Aldershot and Burlington, VT: Ashgate ISBN 0-7546-5307-2
- Cracknell, Kenneth (1985) Towards A New Relationship: Christians and People of Other Faiths, London: Epworth ISBN 978-0-7162-0421-3
- Cracknell, Kenneth (1994) Justice, Courtesy and Love: theologians and missionaries encountering world religions 1846-1914, london: Epworth ISBN 978-0-7162-0501-2
- Cracknell, Kenneth (2001) Wilfred Cantwell Smith: A Reader, Oxford: Oneworld ISBN 978-1-85168-249-2
- Cracknell, Kenneth and White, Susan J (2005) An Introduction to World Methodism. Cambridge: Cambridge University Press ISBN 978-0-521-81849-0
- Cracknell, Kenneth (2006) In Good and Generous Faith: Christian Responses to Religious Pluralism, Cleveland, OH: Pilgrim Press, ISBN 978-0-8298-1721-8
- Forward, Martin; Plant, Stephen; & White, Susan (2000). A great commission: Christian Hope and religious diversity: papers in honour of Kenneth Cracknell on his 65th birthday. Bern: Lang ISBN 978-3-906764-95-5
- Hooker, Roger H and Sargant, John (1991) Belonging to Britain: Christian perspectives on religion and identity in a plural society, London: CCBI Publications ISBN 978-0-85169-204-3
