= Centre for Jewish–Christian Relations =

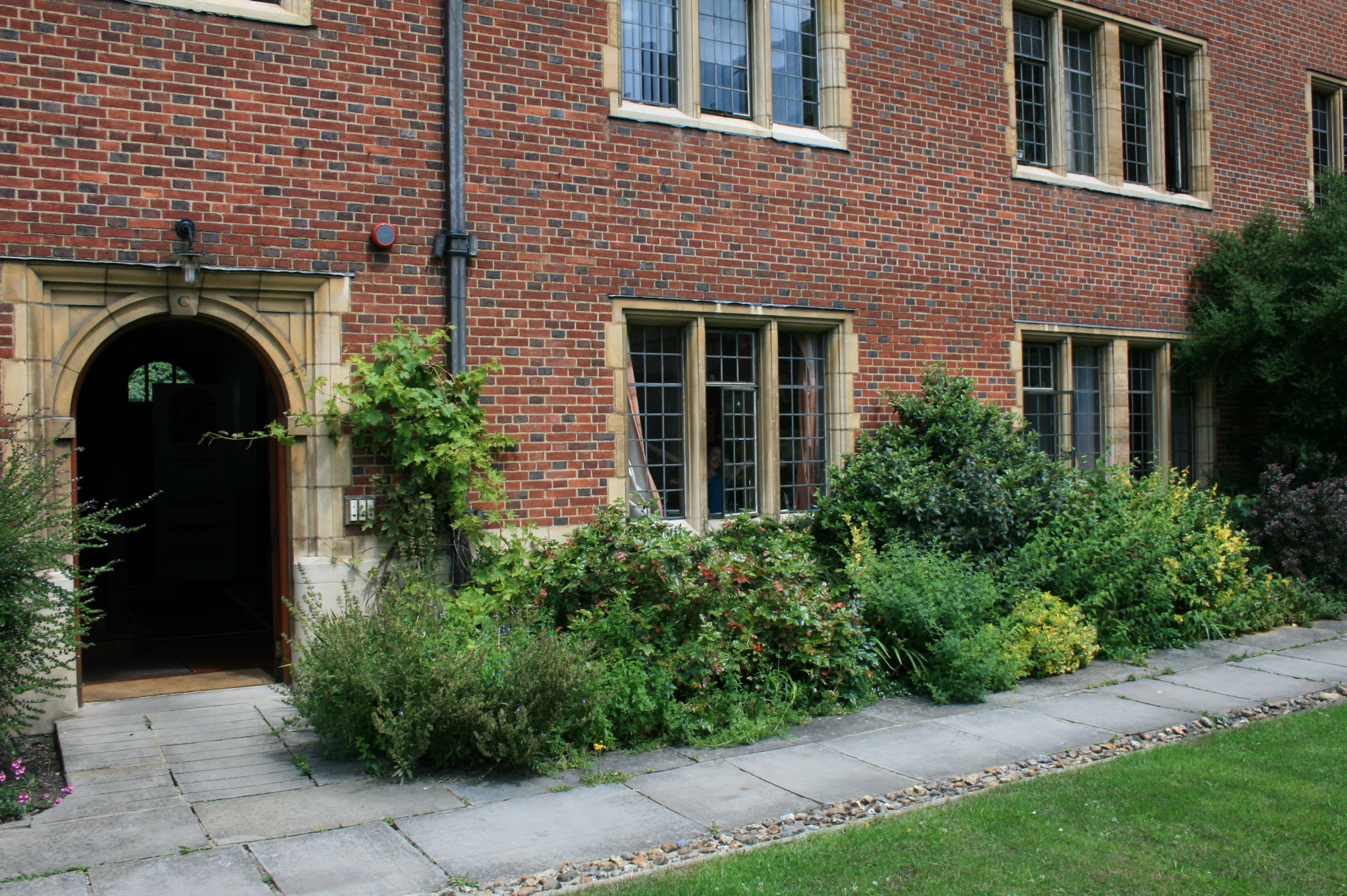
CJCR, The Woolf Institute

The Centre for the Study of Jewish–Christian Relations (CJCR) was based at Wesley House, Cambridge. It was an institute for the study and teaching of Jewish–Christian relations and the promotion of interfaith dialogue. In 2010 CJCR and The Centre for the Study of Muslim-Jewish Relations were renamed The Woolf Institute.

Founded by Edward Kessler and Martin Forward in 1998, CJCR taught the University of Cambridge's Master of Studies in the study of Jewish–Christian relations programme and offered a variety of other educational programmes.
