= Jane Leach =

British minister

The Reverend Jane Leach

Principal of Wesley House
- Incumbent
- Assumed office September 2011

Personal details
- Education: Fitzwilliam College, Cambridge; University of Oxford; University of Nottingham
- Profession: Minister and theologian

Jane Leach is a British Methodist minister and academic, who specialises in pastoral theology. Since September 2011, she has served as Principal of Wesley House, a Methodist theological college in Cambridge. She was also President of the Cambridge Theological Federation from 2015 to 2016.

== Early life and education ==
Leach grew up in the village of River, on the outskirts of Dover, and attended the Dover Grammar School for Girls. Leach has degrees in history and theology. She read history at the University of Oxford. She then trained for ordained ministry at Wesley House, a Methodist theological college in Cambridge, while reading theology at Fitzwilliam College, Cambridge. She undertook postgraduate research at Nottingham, completing her Doctor of Philosophy (PhD) degree in 1997. Her doctoral thesis was titled "The appeal of faith development theory: a sociological perspective".

== Career ==
=== Ordained ministry ===
In 1998, Leach was ordained as a presbyter in the Methodist Church of Great Britain. From 1996 to 2001, she was a circuit minister, with her early ministry spent in the Fenland Methodist Circuit. Since joining Wesley House, she has been a minister of the Cambridge Methodist Circuit.

=== Academic career ===
In 2001, Leach joined Wesley House, a Methodist theological college in Cambridge, as its Director of Pastoral Studies. In September 2011, she was appointed Principal of Wesley House. For 2015/2016 academic year, she served as President of the Cambridge Theological Federation.

Leach lectures and researches in the area of practical theology and theological education at Wesley House and in the Faculty of Divinity, University of Cambridge. She is also a Fellow Commoner of Jesus College, Cambridge, and an associate lecturer of the University of Cambridge.

== Selected works ==
- Leach, Jane (2020). A Charge to Keep: Reflective Supervision and the Renewal of Christian Leadership. Nashville, Tenn.: Wesley’s Foundery Books. ISBN 9781945935725.
- Leach, Jane; Paterson, Michael (2015). Pastoral Supervision: a Handbook (2nd ed.). London: SCM Press. ISBN 978-0334053446.
- Leach, Jane; Paterson, Michael (2010). Pastoral Supervision: a Handbook (1st ed.). London: SCM Press. ISBN 978-0334043256.
- Leach, Jane (2007). Walking the Story: In the Steps of Saints and Pilgrims. Werrington: Inspire. ISBN 978-1905958078.
