= Grayston =

The name Grayston may refer to:

== Given name ==
- Grayston Burgess (1932–2019), English countertenor and conductor
- Greyston Holt (born 1985), Canadian actor
- Grayston Ives (born 1948), British composer, singer and choral director
- Grayston Lynch (1923–2008), American soldier and CIA officer

== Surname ==
- Chris Grayston (active since 1990), British promoter and musician
- Kenneth Grayston (1914–2005), British theologian
- Neil Grayston (actor) (born 1981), Canadian actor
- Neil Grayston (footballer) (born 1975), English footballer
