= The Woolf Institute =

Academic institute in Cambridge, UK

Coordinates: 52.2107°N 0.1110°E

- Former name: The Centre for Jewish-Christian Relations
- Established: 1998
- Founders: Edward Kessler, Martin Forward
- Academic affiliations: University of Cambridge
- President: Edward Kessler
- Director: Dr. Esther-Miriam Wagner
- Location: Cambridge, United Kingdom
- Language: English

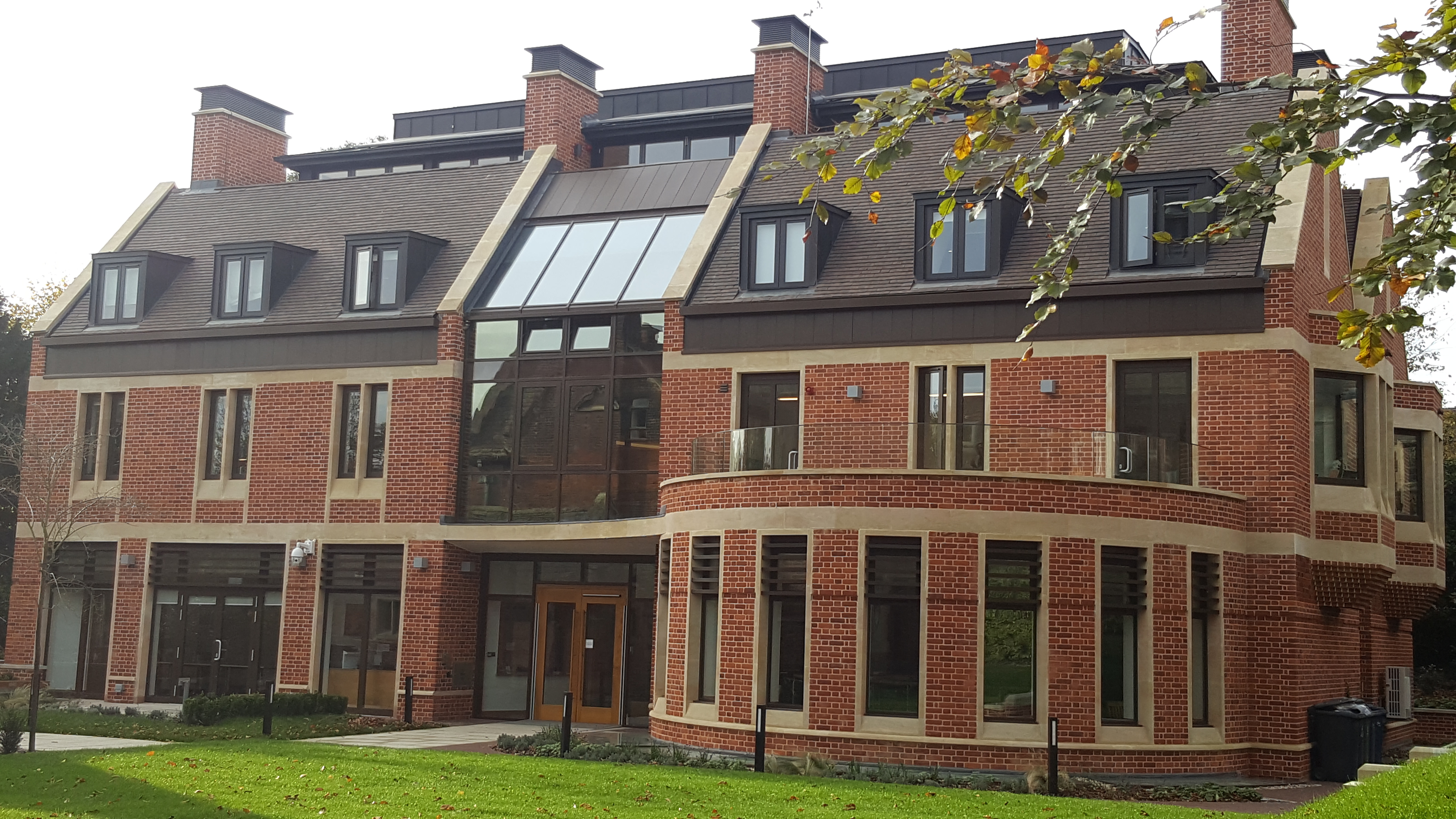
Woolf Institute Building

The Woolf Institute is an academic institute in Cambridge, England. Founded in 1998 by Edward Kessler MBE and Martin Forward, and now located in central Cambridge on the Westminster College Site, it is dedicated to the study of interfaith relations between Jews, Christians and Muslims. Using research and education to explore the relationship between religion and society, it aims to foster greater understanding and tolerance.

Beginning as the Centre for Jewish–Christian Relations, the institute expanded throughout its history to include the Centre for the Study of Muslim-Jewish Relations and the Centre for Policy and Public Education. In 2010, these centers were combined and renamed as The Woolf Institute in honour of Lord Harry Woolf, a patron of the institute and former Lord Chief Justice of England and Wales.

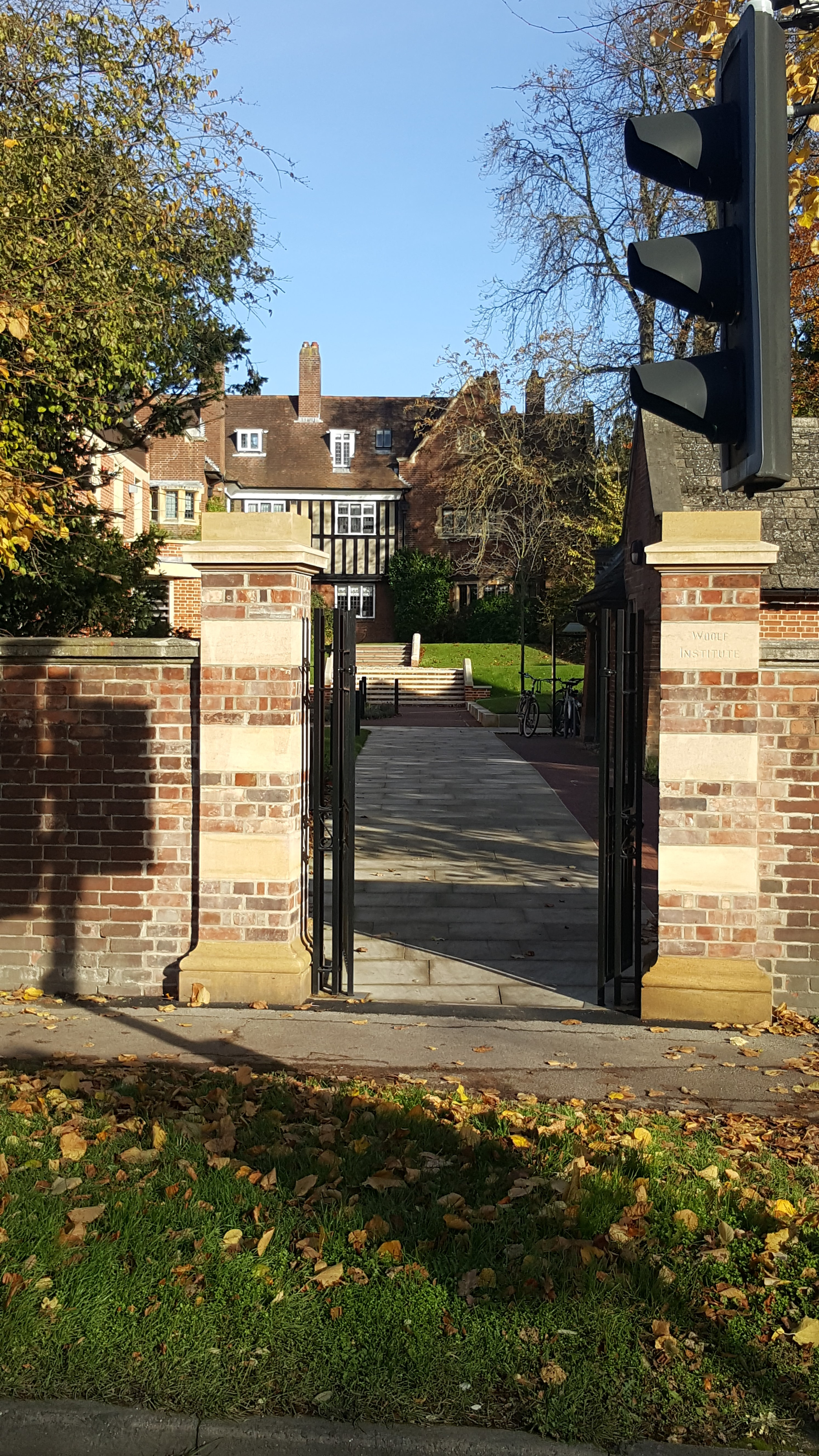
Pedestrian entrance to the Woolf Institute Building

The institute is an associate member of the Cambridge Theological Federation which brings together eleven institutions through which people of different denominations, including Anglican, Methodist, Eastern Orthodox, Reformed and Roman Catholic, train for various forms of Christian ministry and service.

== History ==
The Woolf Institute was established in 1998 as The Center for Jewish-Christian Relations to "provide an academic framework and space in which people could tackle issues of religious difference constructively." In 2010, it combined with The Centre for the Study of Muslim-Jewish Relations and the Centre for Policy and Public Education, and the institute was renamed to The Woolf Institute.

In 2019, the institute set out to explore how to tackle extremism in the United Kingdom, and to find a way to measure different levels of extremism.

In 2026, the Woolf Institute launched the Commission on Interfaith Relations: UK Faith Groups and Global Conflicts, to investigate how global conflicts affect UK Faith communities.

== Teaching ==
The Woolf Institute works together with the Cambridge Commonwealth Trust and the Cambridge Overseas Trust to offer the Woolf Institute Cambridge Scholarship, a PhD scholarship for the study of relations between Jews, Christians and Muslims. It also contributes to the MPhil in Middle East Studies at the University of Cambridge, and offers a Professional Doctorate in collaboration with the Cambridge Theological Federation and Anglia Ruskin University.

== Patrons ==
- The Rt Hon Lord Harry Woolf, CH, PC
  - The Rt Hon Justin Welby, Archbishop of Canterbury
  - Rabbi Ephraim Mirvis, Chief Rabbi of the United Hebrew Congregations of the Commonwealth
  - Cardinal Vincent Nichols, Archbishop of Westminster
  - HRH Prince Hassan of Jordan
  - Archbishop Gregorios, Archbishop of Thyateira and Great Britain
  - Rev Dr Hugh Osgood, Free Church Moderator
  - Rabbi Baroness Julia Neuberger DBE
  - Rabbi Joseph Dweck, Senior Rabbi S&P Congregation
  - Rabbi Lord Jonathan Sacks

=== Inter-faith patrons ===
- Baroness Elizabeth Butler-Sloss GBE
- Dr Richard Stone OBE

=== Honorary vice-presidents ===
- Rev Dominic Fenton (Chair of Trustees: 2003-2007)
- Mr John Pickering (Chair of Trustees: 2007-2010)
- Lord Khalid Hameed CBE (Chair of Trustees: 2010-2016)

== See also ==
- Commission on Religion and Belief in British Public Life
- Religion in the United Kingdom
- Cambridge Theological Federation
