= Ridley Hall, Cambridge =

Theological college in the United Kingdom

Coordinates: 52.200219°N 0.110993°E

Ridley Hall
- Theological college
- Cambridge Theological Federation
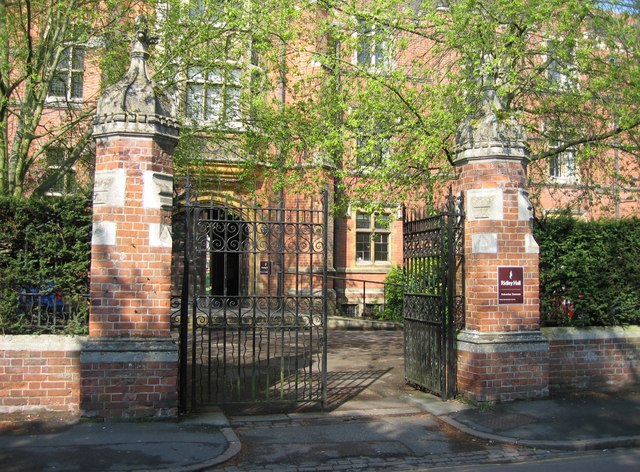
- Location: Cambridge, England
- Motto: Martyrii Memores (Latin)
- Motto in English: Mindful of Martyrdom
- Established: 1881
- Named for: Nicholas Ridley
- Sister college: Wycliffe Hall, Oxford
- Principal: Isabelle Hamley
- Website: www.ridley.cam.ac.uk

Ridley Hall is a theological college located on the corner of Sidgwick Avenue and Ridley Hall Road in Cambridge (United Kingdom), which trains men and women intending to take Holy Orders as deacon or priest of the Church of England, and members of the laity working with children and young people as lay pioneers and within a pastoral capacity such as lay chaplaincy. It is a registered charity.

== History ==
Ridley Hall was founded in 1881 and named in memory of Nicholas Ridley, a leading Anglican theologian and martyr of the sixteenth century. The college's first principal was the theologian Handley Moule, later Bishop of Durham. It was founded under the same Deed of Trust as its sister college Wycliffe Hall, Oxford and to this day both colleges have the ability to nominate two members to the Hall Council of the other.

=== Present day ===
Ridley Hall offers several Common Award qualifications, validated by Durham University. Although not a constituent college of the University of Cambridge, the school has ties with the university's Faculty of Divinity. Some students who are also in a constituent college of the university can be awarded qualifications by Cambridge. Ridley Hall forms part of the Cambridge Theological Federation, along with Westcott House, Westminster College, the Institute for Orthodox Christian Studies, and others.

Ridley Hall's teaching leans towards an evangelical theology. It is one of three Church of England theological colleges that self-identify as "Open Evangelical", the others being Trinity College in Bristol, and Cranmer Hall in Durham.

In November 2023 it was announced that Isabelle Hamley would be the next principal, after it was announced that Michael Volland would be leaving to become the next Bishop of Birmingham. Hamley took up this role in April 2024.

The college publishes an academic journal, Anvil.

== Notable staff and alumni ==
- Jonathan Bailey
- Richard Bauckham
- Jeremy Begbie
- Edward Armstrong Bennett
- Andrew Briggs
- Arthur Buxton
- Christopher John Cocksworth
- Timothy Dudley-Smith
- Dick Lucas
- Michael Nazir-Ali
- Mike Ovey
- Gavin Peacock
- John Sentamu
- David Sheppard
- John Stott
- Michael Volland
- John Waine
- David Watson
- David Wenham
- Andrew White
- Rob Wickham

=== List of principals ===
Thus far, all the principals have been ordained Anglican clergy.

- 1881–1899 (res.): Handley Moule
- 1889–1907 (res.): Thomas Drury
- 1907–1927 (res.): Arthur Tait
- 1927–1945 (res.): Paul Gibson
- 1945–1950 (res.): Falkner Allison
- 1951–1963 (res.): Cyril Bowles
- 1963–1971 (res.): Michael Hennell
- 1971–1972 (res.): Francis Palmer
- 1973–1978 (res.): Keith Sutton
- 1978–1991 (res.): Hugo de Waal
- 1992–2001 (res.): Graham Cray
- 2001–2008 (res.): Christopher Cocksworth
- 2009–2016 (res.): Andrew Norman
- 2016–2024 (res.): Michael Volland
- 2024–present : Isabelle Hamley

== See also ==
- Listed buildings in Cambridge (west)
