= Portrait of Princess Margaret, Countess of Snowdon =

1981 painting by Richard Stone

HRH Princess Margaret, The Countess of Snowdon
- Artist: Richard Stone
- Year: 1981
- Type: Portrait
- Medium: Oil on panel
- Dimensions: 76 cm × 64 cm (30 in × 25 in)

HRH Princess Margaret, The Countess of Snowdon, is a 1981 painting of Princess Margaret by the British artist Richard Stone.

== Description ==
Stone had previously painted a portrait of Margaret's mother, Queen Elizabeth the Queen Mother, the Royal Anglian Regiment of which she was colonel-in-chief. He was then commissioned by the regiment to make a portrait of Margaret, who was their deputy colonel-in-chief. Stone noted that during the sittings "she was going through a very difficult time with her health", and once complained to him: "Mr. Stone. You know I've been suffering from flu for the past two weeks... and I think you've caught it." He later made adjustments to the portrait accordingly. Sittings took place in the Garden Room at Kensington Palace and their sessions were described as "hugely entertaining but also anxiety-ridden" by Stone, who also noted that Margaret would fail to show without prior notice. He produced two portraits of Margaret by the end of summer 1981.

== See also ==
- Richard Stone's portraits of Elizabeth II
- Richard Stone's portraits of Prince Philip, Duke of Edinburgh
- Richard Stone's portraits of Charles, Prince of Wales
- Portrait of Queen Elizabeth the Queen Mother
- Portrait of Prince Andrew, Duke of York
- Portrait of Sophie, Countess of Wessex
