= Richard Stone's portraits of Charles, Prince of Wales =

Paintings by Richard Stone

Charles, Prince of Wales, 2000

Charles, Prince of Wales, 2009

Portraits by Richard Stone

Richard Stone completed two portraits of Charles, Prince of Wales (later Charles III) in 2000 and 2009. In the late 1990s, he painted Charles for the Gordon Highlanders Museum and in the late 2000s at the request of the Worshipful Company of Goldsmiths.

== 2000 portrait ==
The portrait was commissioned by Sir Peter Graham to be displayed at the Gordon Highlanders Museum in Aberdeen, Scotland. Sittings for the painting took at Highgrove House and Charles expressed his satisfaction with the result upon the portrait's painting. The portrait is an oil on canvas and measures 30 in × 25 in (760 mm × 640 mm).

== 2009 portrait ==
The 2009 portrait was commissioned by the Goldsmiths' Company to be displayed at the Goldsmiths' Hall, London. The previous royal portrait commissioned by the company was that of Queen Victoria. Six sittings took place between January and November 2009 at Clarence House and the unveiling took place in 2011 in the presence of Charles and his wife Camilla, Duchess of Cornwall. The portrait is an oil on canvas and measures 84 1/2 in × 53 5/8 in (2,150 mm × 1,360 mm).

In a satirical piece for The Guardian discussing the best and worst royal portraits, John Crace commented on a supposed flaw in the painting, stating in Charles's voice "Can someone please reattach my right arm?"

== See also ==
- Richard Stone's portraits of Elizabeth II
- Richard Stone's portraits of Prince Philip, Duke of Edinburgh
- Portrait of Queen Elizabeth the Queen Mother
- Portrait of Princess Margaret, Countess of Snowdon
- Portrait of Prince Andrew, Duke of York
- Portrait of Sophie, Countess of Wessex
