= Portrait of Sophie, Countess of Wessex =

2006 painting by Richard Stone

HRH The Countess of Wessex
- Artist: Richard Stone
- Year: 2006
- Type: Portrait
- Medium: Oil on canvas
- Dimensions: 97 cm × 71 cm (38 in × 28 in)

HRH The Countess of Wessex, is a 2006 painting of Sophie, Countess of Wessex (later Duchess of Edinburgh) by the British artist Richard Stone.

== Description ==
Stone had begun painting royal portraits by painting Sophie's grandmother-in-law, Queen Elizabeth the Queen Mother for the Royal Anglian Regiment of which she was colonel-in-chief. He was then commissioned by the regiment to make a portrait of her aunt by marriage Princess Margaret and later on he produced portraits of various members of the British royal family. His 2006 portrait of the Countess of Wessex was commissioned by the Queen Alexandra's Royal Army Nursing Corps, of which she was colonel-in-chief. Sittings for the portrait were held at Sophie's residence, Bagshot Park, and she wore a dress by Shanghai Tang. She unveiled the portrait at Sandhurst.

== See also ==
- Richard Stone's portraits of Elizabeth II
- Richard Stone's portraits of Prince Philip, Duke of Edinburgh
- Richard Stone's portraits of Charles, Prince of Wales
- Portrait of Queen Elizabeth the Queen Mother
- Portrait of Princess Margaret, Countess of Snowdon
- Portrait of Prince Andrew, Duke of York
