= Richard Stone's portraits of Prince Philip, Duke of Edinburgh =

Paintings by Richard Stone

Prince Philip, Duke of Edinburgh, 2002

Prince Philip, Duke of Edinburgh, 2007

Portraits by Richard Stone

Richard Stone completed two portraits of Prince Philip, Duke of Edinburgh in 2002 and 2007. In the early 2000s, he painted him for the Guild of Air Pilots and Air Navigators and in 2007 for the National Maritime Museum.

== 2002 portrait ==
The portrait is an oil painting of Philip and measures 25 in × 21 in (640 mm × 530 mm). Philip, who had served as Grand Master of the Guild of Air Pilots and Air Navigators until 2002, and at the suggestion of Lord Cadogan he sat for a portrait to mark his departure after spending five decades in the role. In March 2002 he portrait was unveiled in the presence of Philip and his son Prince Andrew, Duke of York, who succeeded his father in the role of Grand Master. Stone, who painted several portraits of Philip, described his conversations with his as "always robust with his forthright views."

== 2007 portrait ==
The 2007 portrait is also an oil on canvas painting and measures 202.3 cm × 101.5 cm (79.6 in × 40.0 in). It hangs in the National Maritime Museum.

== See also ==
- Richard Stone's portraits of Elizabeth II
- Richard Stone's portraits of Charles, Prince of Wales
- Portrait of Queen Elizabeth the Queen Mother
- Portrait of Princess Margaret, Countess of Snowdon
- Portrait of Prince Andrew, Duke of York
- Portrait of Sophie, Countess of Wessex
