= Portrait of Prince Andrew, Duke of York =

1998 painting by Richard Stone

HRH Prince Andrew, The Duke of York
- Artist: Richard Stone
- Year: 1998
- Type: Portrait
- Medium: Oil on canvas
- Dimensions: 76 cm × 64 cm (30 in × 25 in)

HRH Prince Andrew, The Duke of York, is a 1998 painting of Prince Andrew, Duke of York (later Andrew Mountbatten-Windsor) by the British artist Richard Stone.

== Description ==
Stone had begun painting royal portraits by painting Andrew's grandmother, Queen Elizabeth the Queen Mother for the Royal Anglian Regiment of which she was colonel-in-chief. He was then commissioned by the regiment to make a portrait of his aunt Princess Margaret and later on he produced portraits of various members of the British royal family. His 1998 portrait of Prince Andrew was commissioned by Colonel James Tanner for the Staffordshire Regiment of which Andrew was colonel-in-chief. Andrew provided Stone with multiple 1½-hour sessions and unveiled the portrait at Tidworth. Stone was later commission again in 2002 to paint a portrait of Andrew to mark his appointment as Grand Master of the Guild of Air Pilots and Air Navigators.

== See also ==
- Richard Stone's portraits of Elizabeth II
- Richard Stone's portraits of Prince Philip, Duke of Edinburgh
- Richard Stone's portraits of Charles, Prince of Wales
- Portrait of Queen Elizabeth the Queen Mother
- Portrait of Princess Margaret, Countess of Snowdon
- Portrait of Sophie, Countess of Wessex
