= The Centre for the Study of Muslim-Jewish Relations =

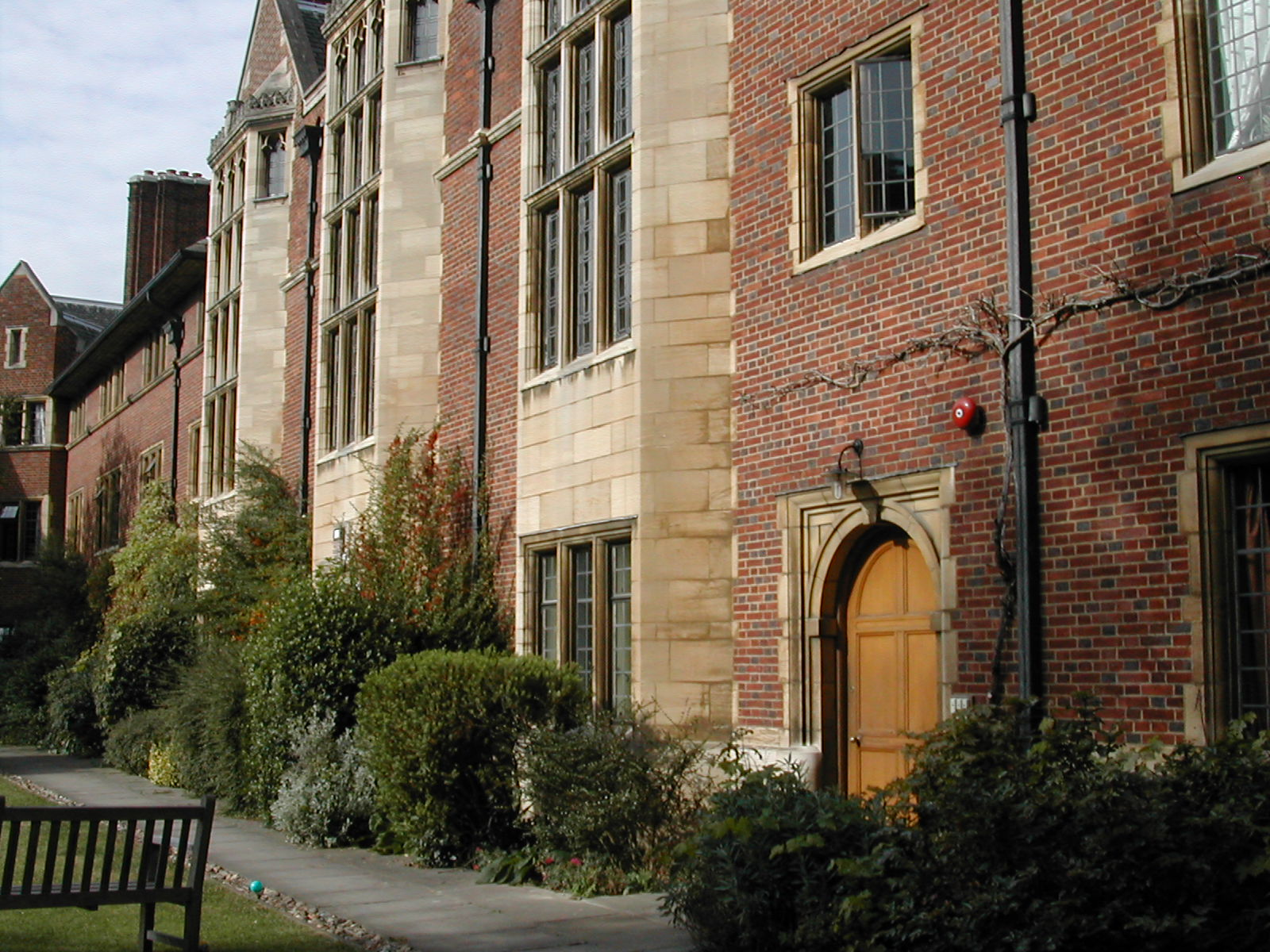
The Woolf Institute, Wesley House

The Centre for Muslim Jewish Relations (CMJR) was based at Wesley House in Cambridge, and was dedicated to the study and teaching of Muslim-Jewish Relations and the promotion of interfaith dialogue. In 2010 the CMJR and The Centre for Jewish-Christian Relations were renamed The Woolf Institute. CMJR was the first academic centre in Europe dedicated to fostering relations between Muslims and Jews through teaching, research and dialogue.
