= Portrait of Queen Elizabeth the Queen Mother =

1986 painting by Richard Stone

Her Majesty Queen Elizabeth, The Queen Mother
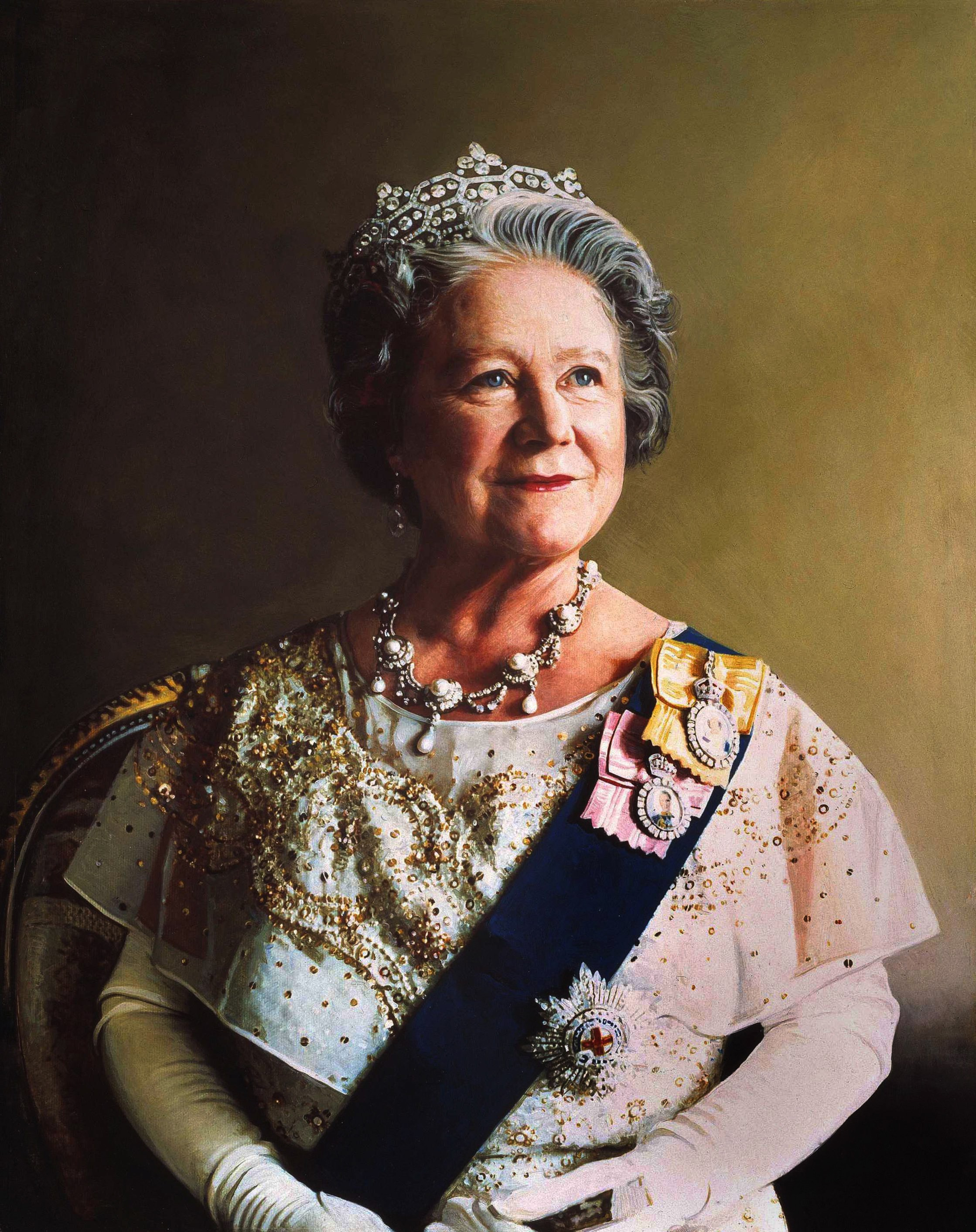
- Artist: Richard Stone
- Year: 1986
- Type: Portrait
- Medium: Oil on panel
- Dimensions: 38 cm × 30 cm (15 in × 12 in)

Her Majesty Queen Elizabeth, The Queen Mother, is a 1986 painting of Elizabeth Bowes-Lyon by the British artist Richard Stone.

== Description ==
Stone started his work as a royal painter by first approaching the household of Queen Elizabeth the Queen Mother, based at Clarence House. Her agreeing to sit for him was according to Stone "rather like winning the Oscar". He painted her six times, first for the Royal Anglian Regiment in her role as their colonel-in-chief, and finally a year before her death in 2002. He described his sittings with her as "hugely entertaining".

Stone's 1986 painting of the Queen Mother was prepared in advance for an exhibition of his works in San Marino, California. The painting, which the artist described as his "best portrait" of Elizabeth, measures 15 in × 12 in (380 mm × 300 mm). The portrait was placed in Queen Elizabeth II's hotel bedroom while she visited Austin, Texas, in 1991.

With Prince Michael of Kent's involvement and at Stone's suggestion, it was auctioned off in 1993 and raised £25,000 for the Queen Elizabeth Gate appeal. According to press at the time, the buyer of the painting was Laurence Graff.

== See also ==
- Richard Stone's portraits of Elizabeth II
- Richard Stone's portraits of Prince Philip, Duke of Edinburgh
- Richard Stone's portraits of Charles, Prince of Wales
- Portrait of Princess Margaret, Countess of Snowdon
- Portrait of Prince Andrew, Duke of York
- Portrait of Sophie, Countess of Wessex
