= Richard Stone's portraits of Elizabeth II =

Paintings by Richard Stone

Elizabeth II, 1992

Elizabeth II, 2015

Portraits by Richard Stone

Richard Stone completed two portraits of Queen Elizabeth II in 1992 and 2015. In the early 1990s, he painted her for the Borough of Colchester's 800th Charter Anniversary, which had been marked in 1989, and in 2015 at the request of the Commonwealth nations ahead of the 2015 Commonwealth Heads of Government Meeting.

== 1992 portrait: Her Majesty Queen Elizabeth II ==
Her Majesty Queen Elizabeth II is a 1992 oil painting of Elizabeth II that hangs at the Colchester Town Hall in Essex. It measures 96 in × 60 in (2,400 mm × 1,500 mm). Stone was first approached by Elizabeth's private secretary, Sir Robert Fellowes, to be commissioned for a painting that would mark the Borough of Colchester's 800th Charter Anniversary. Sittings for the portrait took place between June 1989 and June 1990 and the Queen sat for the artist seven times during one-hour sessions in the Yellow Drawing Room at Buckingham Palace. The unveiling ceremony took place at the National Portrait Gallery, London, after which the painting was presented to Colchester Borough Council in February 1992.

The painting was chosen by the BBC for their obituary broadcasts when the Queen died on 8 September 2022.

== 2015 portrait: Her Majesty Queen Elizabeth II, Realms Portrait ==
Her Majesty Queen Elizabeth II, Realms Portrait is Stone's second oil painting of Elizabeth II, first unveiled in 2015 at a reception in St James's Palace ahead of the 2015 Commonwealth Heads of Government Meeting. It measures 74 in × 48 1/2 in (1,880 mm × 1,230 mm) and is now part of the Royal Collection. Like the previous portrait, the Queen wears the George IV State Diadem and her crimson silk parliamentary robes.

== See also ==
- Richard Stone's portraits of Prince Philip, Duke of Edinburgh
- Richard Stone's portraits of Charles, Prince of Wales
- Portrait of Queen Elizabeth the Queen Mother
- Portrait of Princess Margaret, Countess of Snowdon
- Portrait of Prince Andrew, Duke of York
- Portrait of Sophie, Countess of Wessex
