= David Wilkinson (theologian) =

British theologian

The Reverend Professor David Wilkinson FRAS
- Born: 16 May 1963 (age 63)
- Occupations: Theological college principal, project director
- Title: Director of Equipping Christian Leadership in an Age of Science (ECLAS), St John's College, Durham

Academic background
- Education: Durham University; Fitzwilliam College, Cambridge; Wesley House, Cambridge

Academic work
- Discipline: Astrophysics and theology
- Institutions: University of Liverpool; University of Durham; St John's College, Durham

David Adam Wilkinson, FRAS (born 16 May 1963) is a British Methodist minister, theologian, astrophysicist and academic. He was the Principal of St John's College, Durham (2006–2023), and is a professor in the Department of Theology and Religion at Durham University. He remains at St John's College, having been appointed, in September 2023, Director of Equipping Christian Leadership in an Age of Science (ECLAS), an international project based at St John’s College. He is the author of several books on the relationship between science and religion, and a regular contributor to Thought for the Day on BBC Radio 4. He has a PhD in astrophysics and is a Fellow of the Royal Astronomical Society.

== Early life and education ==
Wilkinson was born on 16 May 1963. An undergraduate at Grey College, Durham, he studied at the University of Durham, graduating with a Bachelor of Science (BSc) degree in 1984. He remained at Durham to undertake a Doctor of Philosophy (PhD) degree in theoretical astrophysics. His PhD was awarded in 1987: his doctoral thesis was titled "Molecular hydrogen in galaxies" and related to the study of star formation.

After completing his science doctorate, Wilkinson changed direction. He studied theology at Fitzwilliam College, Cambridge alongside his training as a Methodist minister at Wesley House, Cambridge. He graduated from the University of Cambridge with a Bachelor of Arts (BA) degree in 1989: as per tradition, his BA was promoted to a Master of Arts (MA Cantab) degree. He would later study for a PhD in systematic theology at the University of Durham, which he completed in 2004 with a doctoral thesis titled "Christian eschatology and the physical universe".

== Career ==
After ordination, he was a Methodist minister in Letchworth from 1990 to 1991. He then took on two posts: as minister of Elm Hall Drive Methodist Church in Liverpool and a chaplain at the University of Liverpool. In 1999, he moved to Durham where he had been appointed a fellow in Christian apologetics at St John's College, Durham. Then, from 2004 to 2006, he was Wesley Research Lecturer in Theology and Science in the University of Durham's Department of Theology and Religion. In December 2005, it was announced that he would be returning to St John's College, having been appointed its next principal in succession to Professor Stephen Sykes. He had to be given permission by the Methodist Church for the appointment due to the college's Anglican foundation: St John's college is both a college of Durham University and an evangelical Anglican theological college. He took up the post in 2006. He was additionally made a professor in the Department of Theology and Religion in 2011.

Wilkinson's academic interests focus on the interaction between theology and science. He has also published on Stephen Hawking, spirituality in contemporary cinema and the doctrine of holiness. He has been a council member of the Evangelical Alliance.

In January 2024, he was installed as an ecumenical Canon of Durham Cathedral.

== Personal life ==
In 1992, Wilkinson married Alison. She is also a Methodist minister. Together they have one son and one daughter.

== Selected bibliography ==
=== Books ===
- God, the big bang, and Stephen Hawking. Tunbridge Wells, England: Monarch. 1993. ISBN 9781854242075.
- Alone in the universe?: aliens, the X-files & God. Downers Grove, IL: InterVarsity Press. 1997. ISBN 9780830819386.
- Wilkinson, David; Frost, Rob (1999). A new start?: hopes and dreams for the new millennium. London: Hodder & Stoughton. ISBN 9780340713891.
- The message of creation: encountering the Lord of the universe. Downers Grove, IL: InterVarsity Press. 2002. ISBN 9780830824052.
- Wilkinson, David; Barton, Stephen (2009). Reading Genesis after Darwin. Oxford, UK: Oxford University Press. ISBN 9780195383362.
- Christian eschatology and the physical universe. London: T & T Clark. 2010. ISBN 9780567045461.
- Science, religion, and the search for extraterrestrial intelligence. Oxford, UK: Oxford University Press. 2013. ISBN 978-0-1996-8020-7.
- When I pray what does God do. Oxford, UK: Monarch. 2015. ISBN 978-0-8572-1604-5.
- How Does God Act in the World?: Science, Miracle, and Mission. Eugene, OR: Cascade Books. 2025. ISBN 979-8-3852-0881-4.

=== Articles ===
- "The Art of Apologetics in the 21st Century". Anvil. 19: 5–17. 2002.
- "Dawkins, the Simpsons and God: Public Theology and Pop Culture". Epworth Review. 35 (4): 6–20. 2008.
- "The Work of a Friend: Theology in the Light of the Origin of Species". Epworth Review. 36 (2): 45–65. 2009.
- "Christian Apologetics in a Post-Christian Culture". Catalyst. 35 (2): 1–3. 2009.
