= David Pawson =

British minister (1930–2020)

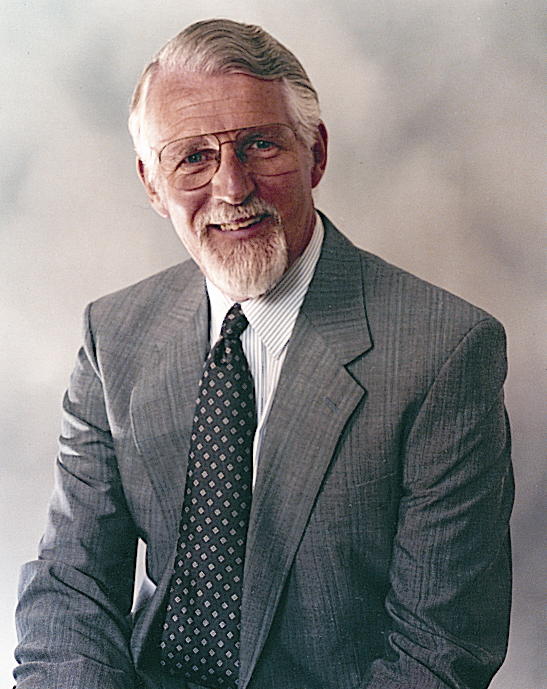
- Born: 25 February 1930; Northeast England
- Died: 21 May 2020 (aged 90)
- Education: Durham University; Wesley House, Cambridge
- Occupations: International Bible expositor, theologian, pastor, previously chaplain
- Writing career
- Genres: Christian apologetics, Evangelist
- Subject: Bible study (Christian)
- Website: www.davidpawson.org

John David Pawson (25 February 1930 – 21 May 2020) was an English evangelical minister, writer and prominent Bible teacher.

== Biography ==
According to his autobiography, Pawson's immediate ancestors were all farmers, Methodist preachers or both, dating back to John Pawson, a friend and follower of John Wesley. His father, Henry Cecil Pawson FRSE (1897–1978), was head of Agriculture at Durham University and Vice President of the Methodist conference.

From his childhood in the north of England, Pawson had wanted to be a farmer. By the time he had completed his studies for a Bachelor of Science (BSc) degree in agriculture at Durham University, he expressed desire in joining the ministry. He then studied for a Bachelor of Arts (BA) and Master of Arts (MA) in theology at Wesley House, a Methodist theological college in Cambridge. On 1 September 1956, after training, he was commissioned in the Chaplains Branch, Royal Air Force as a chaplain with the relative rank of flight lieutenant. He served in Aden, and relinquished his commission, thereby leaving the RAF, on 1 September 1959.

After leaving the RAF, he served as a Methodist minister, but gradually expressed disapproval of infant baptism. After appearing before a doctrinal committee of the Methodist church, he volunteered to leave the denomination, and did so. Shortly thereafter, he accepted an invitation to become the pastor of Gold Hill Baptist Church in Buckinghamshire, from 1961 to 1968.

Later, as pastor of Guildford Baptist Church (nicknamed Millmead, which he helped to design), he established a reputation among both evangelicals and charismatics as a Bible teacher. From here, his teaching tapes, originally made for the church's sick and elderly members, became popular worldwide. Under his ministry, the church became one of the largest Baptist churches in the United Kingdom.

Pawson left Guildford Baptist Church in 1981 and engaged in an itinerant worldwide Bible teaching ministry predominantly through seminars for church leaders in Asia, Australia, Africa, England, Europe, and the United States. Millions of copies of his teachings have been distributed in more than 120 countries. He was a writer and speaker with a reputation of urgency, clarity, and faithfulness to the Scriptures. His overviews of the books of the Bible have been published and recorded in Unlocking the Bible, available on CDs, DVDs, and YouTube.

Pawson died on 21 May 2020 at the age of 90.

== Teachings ==
In The Normal Christian Birth, Pawson argued that a biblical initiation into Christianity should involve more than the simple "Sinner's Prayer". Whilst accepting the fundamental basis of salvation by faith, he argued that the Biblical model of a person's "birth" into God's kingdom included aspects which are frequently ignored or forgotten today. He proposed four principal steps: repentance towards God; believing in Jesus; baptism in water; and receiving the Holy Spirit; this, according to Pawson, is the biblical pattern for a "normal Christian birth". According to the book itself, Pawson advocates for "a synthesis of the 'liberal' emphasis on repentance, the 'evangelical' on faith, the 'sacramental' on baptism and the 'pentecostal' on the Spirit." This book has been influential and is taught at a number of theological seminaries and mission stations.

In Leadership is Male, Pawson teaches that leadership is a role given by God to men. In so doing, he criticises men for not taking proper responsibility in important aspects of family and church life. He argues that modern men too often neglect their social obligations and should return to the Biblical model of manhood. This book's foreword was written by a woman, Elisabeth Elliot.

In The Road to Hell, Pawson is critical of annihilationism, the teaching that the punishment of hell is not eternal. He teaches that people who go to hell experience eternal suffering. According to the book itself, by "challenging the modern alternatives of liberal 'universalism' and evangelical 'annihilationism', David Pawson presents the traditional concept of endless torment as soundly biblical."

In Unlocking the Bible, Pawson presents a book by book study of the whole Bible. The book is based on his belief that the Bible should be studied, as it was written, "a book at a time" (certainly not a verse, or even a chapter at a time), and that each book is best understood by discovering why and for whom it was written. It is based on an arranged series of talks in which he set out the background, purpose, meaning and relevance of each book of the Bible, and was transcribed into written form by Andy Peck. The groundwork for this study was laid in the 1960s and 70s, when Pawson took his congregation through nearly half of the Old Testament and all of the New Testament line by line (recordings of those studies are still distributed).

In When Jesus Returns, he critically considers in the light of scripture the major views on eschatology popular in the church today, specifically the preterist, historicist, futurist and idealist schools of interpreting the Book of Revelation. He rejects postmillennialism in favour of a premillennial understanding of the Second Coming, so that Jesus will return bodily in power immediately before his reign over the world for a millennium from Jerusalem. He asserts that the supernatural taking up of believers alive at this time (following the 'tribulation' period of persecution), so as to join the returning Christ, fulfills the Rapture prophecies; he argues against a pre-tribulation timing of the rapture. He further argues that the return of the Jews to the Holy Land is a fulfillment of scriptural prophecy, and that prophecies spoken about Israel relate specifically to Israel (not to the church), so that the outstanding prophecies about Israel will be fulfilled before the end of the age.

In Jesus Baptises in One Holy Spirit, Pawson discusses the evidence for the Baptism in the Holy Spirit as a separate event from believing, repentance and water baptism. He argues that a believer does not receive the indwelling Holy Spirit until s/he is baptized in the Spirit, a distinct experience evidenced by charismatic gifts such as prophecy or tongues. This differs from the evangelical view that the Spirit is automatically received when a person believes, and the Pentecostal view that receiving the indwelling Spirit (at conversion) and receiving the Baptism in the Spirit are two experiences with different purposes.

In The Challenge of Islam to Christians, Pawson documents the present rapid rise of Islam in the West. He explains what Islam is, arguing that its rejection of Jesus Christ's divinity mean the two faiths cannot be reconciled, and he proposes a Christian response, based on the church purifying itself. The book details Pawson's testing of his premonition that Britain would become Islamic. In comparing the situation to that portrayed by the Hebrew prophet Habakkuk, Pawson implies that the rise of Islam could be impending judgement for the immorality into which Western churches and secular humanist society has sunk.

In Once Saved, Always Saved?, Pawson uses scripture to question the frequent evangelical claim that someone who has once believed in Jesus Christ will end up with Christ in heaven whatever that person subsequently believes or does. (Twelve years earlier, another evangelical, RT Kendall, summed up this claim in a book having the same title without a question mark.) Pawson points to the need to persevere in faith, and to the repeated exhortations in scripture to do so.

In Word and Spirit Together: Uniting Charismatics and Evangelicals (originally published as Fourth Wave), Pawson calls for an end to the division between charismatic and Evangelical Christians over the issue of Spiritual Baptism and charismatic gifts. He argues that the charismatic gifts are for the church today but that their practice should be built on a solid scriptural basis. He therefore argues that the two groups should learn from each other, to the benefit of both.

In Defending Christian Zionism, Pawson puts the case that the return of the Jews to the Holy Land is a fulfillment of scriptural prophecy, and that Christians should support the existence of the Jewish State (although not unconditionally its actions) on theological grounds. He also argues that prophecies spoken about Israel relate specifically to Israel (not to the church, as in "replacement theology"). However, he criticises dispensationalism, a largely American movement holding similar views about Israel. Pawson's book Israel in the New Testament continues the Christian Zionist theme.

Pawson also wrote a number of commentaries where he went through an entire book of the Bible in detail. This series is based on the preaching of David Pawson to his congregation back in the 60s and 70s. This series, which includes almost all of the books of the New Testament Books and selected books of the Old Testament, was added to on a regular basis.

== Works ==
Pawson was the author of more than 90 books, produced more than 300 teaching videos and more than 1600 audio recordings.

- Pawson, David; Buchanan, Colin O. (1976). Infant baptism under cross-examination. Grove booklets on ministry and worship. Vol. 24. Bramcote, UK: Grove Books. ISBN 9780901710895. OCLC 2875351.
- ——— (1977). Truth to tell. Hodder Christian paperbacks. London: Hodder and Stoughton. ISBN 9780340212912. OCLC 14561915.
- ——— (1988). Leadership is Male. Anchor Recordings Ltd. ISBN 978-1-909886-67-4.
- ——— (1989). The Normal Christian Birth. Hodder. ISBN 978-0-340489-72-7.
- ——— (1992). The Road to Hell. Anchor Recordings Ltd. ISBN 978-1-909886-59-9.
- ——— (1993). Understanding Water Baptism. Anchor Recordings Ltd. ISBN 978-1-911173-24-3.
- ——— (1993). Fourth wave: charismatics and evangelicals, are we ready to come together?. London: Hodder & Stoughton. ISBN 9780340580424. OCLC 28114208. - later published as Word and spirit together : uniting Charismatics and Evangelicals
- ——— (1993). Explaining the Resurrection: The Heart of Christianity. Anchor Recordings Ltd. ISBN 978-1-911173-30-4.
- ——— (1995). Is the blessing Biblical? : thinking through the Toronto phenomenon. London: Hodder & Stoughton. ISBN 9780340661475. OCLC 34788723.
- ——— (1995). When Jesus Returns. Hodder. ISBN 978-0-340612-11-8.
- ——— (1996). Once Saved, Always Saved?. Hodder. ISBN 978-0-340610-66-4.
- ——— (1997). Jesus Baptises in One Holy Spirit: Who? How? When? Why?. Anchor Recordings Ltd. ISBN 978-1-909886-66-7.
- ——— (2003). Unlocking the Bible. Harper Collins. ISBN 978-0-007166-66-4.
- ——— (2003). The Challenge of Islam to Christians. Hodder. ISBN 978-0-340861-89-9.
- ——— (2008). Defending Christian Zionism. Anchor Recordings Ltd. ISBN 978-1-909886-31-5.
- ——— (2008). Living in Hope. Anchor Recordings Ltd. ISBN 978-1-909886-65-0.
- ——— (2009). Israel in the New Testament. Bradford on Avon, UK: Terra Nova. ISBN 9781901949643. OCLC 352935544.
- ——— (2009). Why does God allow Natural Disasters?. Anchor Recordings Ltd. ISBN 978-1-909886-58-2.
- ——— (2006). Christianity Explained. Anchor Recordings Ltd. ISBN 978-1-909886-64-3.
- ——— (2010). Come with me through Isaiah. Bradford on Avon, UK: Terra Nova. ISBN 9781901949681. OCLC 670190108.
- ——— (2017). Unlocking the Bible - Charts, Diagrams and Images. Anchor Recordings Ltd. ISBN 978-1-911173-17-5.
- ——— (n.d.). Not as bad as the truth. Hodder. ISBN 978-0-340864-27-2.
- ——— (n.d.). Angels. Anchor Recordings Ltd. ISBN 978-1-909886-02-5.
- ——— (n.d.). 'By God, I Will' – The Biblical Covenants. Anchor Recordings Ltd. ISBN 978-1-909886-21-6.
- ——— (n.d.). The Character of God. Anchor Recordings Ltd. ISBN 978-1-909886-34-6.
- ——— (n.d.). Completing Luther's Reformation. Anchor Recordings Ltd. ISBN 978-1-911173-26-7.
- ——— (n.d.). The God and the Gospel of Righteousness. Anchor Recordings Ltd. ISBN 978-1-909886-68-1.
- ——— (n.d.). Is John3:16 the Gospel?. Anchor Recordings Ltd. ISBN 978-1-909886-62-9.
- ——— (n.d.). Jesus: the Seven Wonders of HIStory. Anchor Recordings Ltd. ISBN 978-1-909886-24-7.
- ——— (n.d.). Kingdoms in conflict. Anchor Recordings Ltd. ISBN 978-1-909886-04-9.
- ——— (n.d.). Loose Leaves from my Bible. Anchor Recordings Ltd. ISBN 978-1-909886-55-1.
- ——— (n.d.). The Lord's Prayer. Anchor Recordings Ltd. ISBN 978-1-909886-71-1.
- ——— (n.d.). The Maker's Instructions. Anchor Recordings Ltd. ISBN 978-1-909886-30-8.
- ——— (n.d.). Practising the Principles of Prayer. Anchor Recordings Ltd. ISBN 978-1-909886-63-6.
- ——— (n.d.). A Preacher's Legacy. Anchor Recordings Ltd. ISBN 978-1-911173-27-4.
- ——— (n.d.). Remarriage is Adultery Unless…. Anchor Recordings Ltd. ISBN 978-1-909886-22-3.
- ——— (n.d.). Simon Peter – the Reed and the Rock. Anchor Recordings Ltd. ISBN 978-1-909886-23-0.
- ——— (n.d.). What the Bible says about the Holy Spirit. Anchor Recordings Ltd. ISBN 978-1-909886-54-4.
- ——— (n.d.). Where is Jesus Now? And what is he doing?. Anchor Recordings Ltd. ISBN 978-1-911173-78-6.
- ——— (n.d.). Where has the Body been for 2000 Years?. Anchor Recordings Ltd. ISBN 978-1-909886-20-9.
- ——— (n.d.). Understanding the Second Coming. Anchor Recordings Ltd. ISBN 978-1-911173-23-6.
- ——— (n.d.). Understanding the Resurrection. Anchor Recordings Ltd. ISBN 978-1-911173-22-9.
- ——— (n.d.). A Commentary on the Gospel of MARK. Anchor Recordings Ltd. ISBN 978-1-909886-26-1.
- ——— (n.d.). A Commentary on the Gospel of Luke. Anchor Recordings Ltd. ISBN 978-1-911173-21-2.
- ——— (n.d.). A Commentary on the Gospel of John. Anchor Recordings Ltd. ISBN 978-1-909886-27-8.
- ——— (n.d.). A Commentary on ACTS. Anchor Recordings Ltd. ISBN 978-1-909886-38-4.
- ——— (n.d.). A Commentary on ROMANS. Anchor Recordings Ltd. ISBN 978-1-909886-78-0.
- ——— (n.d.). A Commentary on 1 & 2 CORINTHIANS. Anchor Recordings Ltd. ISBN 978-1-909886-95-7.
- ——— (n.d.). A Commentary on GALATIANS. Anchor Recordings Ltd. ISBN 978-1-909886-29-2.
- ——— (n.d.). A Commentary on EPHESIANS. Anchor Recordings Ltd. ISBN 978-1-909886-98-8.
- ——— (n.d.). A Commentary on PHILIPPIANS. Anchor Recordings Ltd. ISBN 978-1-909886-74-2.
- ——— (n.d.). A Commentary on 1 & 2 THESSALONIANS. Anchor Recordings Ltd. ISBN 978-1-909886-73-5.
- ——— (n.d.). A Commentary on The Personal Letters: 1 & 2 Timothy, Titus, Philemon. Anchor Recordings Ltd. ISBN 978-1-909886-70-4.
- ——— (n.d.). A Commentary on HEBREWS. Anchor Recordings Ltd. ISBN 978-1-909886-33-9.
- ——— (n.d.). A Commentary on JAMES. Anchor Recordings Ltd. ISBN 978-1-909886-72-8.
- ——— (n.d.). A Commentary on 1 & 2 PETER. Anchor Recordings Ltd. ISBN 978-1-909886-79-7.
- ——— (n.d.). A Commentary on the LETTERS OF JOHN. Anchor Recordings Ltd. ISBN 978-1-909886-69-8.
- ——— (n.d.). A Commentary on JUDE. Anchor Recordings Ltd. ISBN 978-1-909886-28-5.
- ——— (n.d.). A Commentary on the BOOK OF REVELATION. Anchor Recordings Ltd. ISBN 978-1-909886-25-4.
- ——— (n.d.). A Commentary on GENESIS 1–25. Anchor Recordings Ltd. ISBN 978-1-911173-82-3.
- ——— (n.d.). A Commentary on EXODUS. Anchor Recordings Ltd. ISBN 978-1-911173-85-4.
- ——— (n.d.). A Commentary on DANIEL. Anchor Recordings Ltd. ISBN 978-1-911173-06-9.
- ——— (n.d.). A Commentary on ZECHARIAH. Anchor Recordings Ltd. ISBN 978-1-911173-38-0.
- ——— (n.d.). A Commentary on JEREMIAH. Anchor Recordings Ltd. ISBN 978-1-911173-76-2.
- ——— (n.d.). Come with me through ISAIAH. Anchor Recordings Ltd. ISBN 978-1-909886-61-2.
- ——— (n.d.). Explaining Building a New Testament Church. Anchor Recordings Ltd. ISBN 978-1-911173-69-4.
- ——— (n.d.). Explaining the Key Steps to Becoming a Christian – Second Edition. Anchor Recordings Ltd. ISBN 978-1-911173-87-8.
- ——— (n.d.). Explaining the Amazing Story of Jesus. Anchor Recordings Ltd. ISBN 978-1-911173-29-8.
- ——— (n.d.). Explaining Being Anointed and Filled with the Holy Spirit. Anchor Recordings Ltd. ISBN 978-1-911173-18-2.
- ——— (n.d.). Explaining De-Greecing the Church. Anchor Recordings Ltd. ISBN 978-1-911173-20-5.
- ——— (n.d.). Explaining End Times. Anchor Recordings Ltd. ISBN 978-1-911173-46-5.
- ——— (n.d.). Explaining Eternally Secure?. Anchor Recordings Ltd. ISBN 978-1-911173-19-9.
- ——— (n.d.). Explaining Grace. Anchor Recordings Ltd. ISBN 978-1-909886-84-1.
- ——— (n.d.). Explaining How to Study a Book of the Bible: Jude. Anchor Recordings Ltd. ISBN 978-1-911173-34-2.
- ——— (n.d.). Explaining New Testament Baptism Anchor Recordings Ltd. Anchor Recordings. ISBN 978-1-911173-33-5.
- ——— (n.d.). Explaining Studying the Bible. Anchor Recordings Ltd. ISBN 978-1-911173-31-1.
- ——— (n.d.). Explaining the Trinity. Anchor Recordings Ltd. ISBN 978-1-911173-07-6.
- ——— (n.d.). Explaining the Truth about Christmas – Revised Edition. Anchor Recordings Ltd. ISBN 978-1-911173-77-9.
- ——— (n.d.). Explaining Three texts often taken out of context. Anchor Recordings Ltd. ISBN 978-1-909886-85-8.
- ——— (n.d.). Explaining What the Bible says about money. Anchor Recordings Ltd. ISBN 978-1-911173-35-9.
- ——— (n.d.). Explaining What the Bible says about work. Anchor Recordings Ltd. ISBN 978-1-911173-36-6.
- ——— (n.d.). Introducing Genesis. Anchor Recordings Ltd. ISBN 978-1-911173-80-9.
