= Ernest Gordon Rupp =

British clergy (1910–1986)

Ernest Gordon Rupp FBA

President of the Methodist Conference
- In office 1968–1969
- Vice President: John Clifford Blake CB
- Preceded by: Irvonwy Morgan
- Succeeded by: Brian Stapleton O'Gorman

Personal details
- Born: 7 January 1910 London
- Died: 19 December 1986 (aged 76) Cambridge
- Occupation: Methodist preacher, historian and Luther scholar

Ernest Gordon Rupp FBA (7 January 1910 – 19 December 1986) was a Methodist preacher, historian and Luther scholar.

== Early life and education ==
Rupp was born on 7 January 1910 in London and attended Owen's School in Islington. He studied history at King's College London, theology at Cambridge's Wesley House, and in Strasbourg and Basel during 1936–1937.

== Ministry ==
From 1938 to 1946 he served as a Methodist minister in New Eltham and Chislehurst (southeast London). He came to public notice in 1945 when he challenged the charge that Martin Luther was the spiritual ancestor of Hitler. The charge was made by Peter F. Wiener in a widely distributed pamphlet, Martin Luther: Hitler's Spiritual Ancestor.

In 1946, Rupp served as the assistant to the Principal of Wesley House. In 1947, he was appointed assistant professor at Richmond College.

Rupp participated in the reconstruction efforts of the World Council of Churches in Europe. In 1947, he visited Berlin, Nuremberg, Stuttgart, Heidelberg, Frankfurt, Hamburg, Bremen and Delmenhorst. During this time, he lectured at the conference of the Methodist church of Northwest Germany.

After his tenure at Richmond (1947–1952), he served at Wesley House in Cambridge. In 1956, he was appointed professor of Church History at the University of Manchester. He lectured there until 1967, when he returned to Wesley House in Cambridge as its Principal. At the same time (1968–1977) he served as Dixie Professor of Ecclesiastical History at the University of Cambridge. In 1968, he served as the president of the British Methodist church. Rupp received honorary doctorates from Cambridge, University of Aberdeen, University of Manchester and University of Paris, and was appointed as a Fellow of the British Academy in 1970.

Rupp died on 19 December 1986 in Cambridge.

== Works by Gordon Rupp ==
- Holy Book and holy tradition: International colloquium held in the Faculty of Theology, University of Manchester. ed. F.F.Bruce & E. Gordon Rupp. Manchester, England: Manchester University Press, 1968.
- Rupp, E. Gordon. "I seek my brethren:" Bishop Bell and the German Churches. London: Epworth, 1975.
- Rupp, E. Gordon. Is this a Christian Country?, 1941.
- Rupp, E. Gordon. Luther's progress to the Diet of Worms, 1521.NL: NP, 1951.
- Rupp, E. Gordon. The King of Glory: Studies in St. Paul's Epistle to the Colossians. London: Epworth Press, 1940.
- Rupp, E. Gordon. Martin Luther, Hitler's Cause or Cure? London and Redhill, Lutterworth press, 1945.
- Rupp, E. Gordon. Religion in England 1688–1791. London : S.C.M. Press, 1975.
- Rupp, E. Gordon. The Righteousness of God: Luther studies. London: Hodder and Stoughton, 1953.
- Rupp, E. Gordon. Study in the making of the English Protestant Tradition, Mainly into the Reign of Henry VIII. Cambridge, England: Cambridge University Press, 1947.
- Rupp, E. Gordon. Thomas More: the King's good servant, New York : Collins, 1978.
- Rupp, E. Gordon. Principalities and Powers: Studies in the Christian Conflict in History, London: Epworth, 1952.
- Rupp, E. Gordon. Patterns of Reformation, London: Epworth, 1969.
