= Commission on Religion and Belief in British Public Life =

The Commission on Religion and Belief in British Public Life (CORAB) was convened in 2013 by The Woolf Institute. Its purpose was to consider the place and role of religion and belief in contemporary Britain, to consider the significance of emerging trends and identities, and to make recommendations for public life and policy. Its premise was that in a rapidly changing diverse society everyone is affected, whatever their private views on religion and belief, by how public policy and public institutions respond to social change.

The Commission on Religion and Belief in British Public Life is chaired by Elizabeth Butler-Sloss, Baroness Butler-Sloss and vice-chaired and convened by Edward Kessler. Its twenty members had a wide range of involvement in the issues that were examined. They were diverse in terms of age, gender, ethnicity and occupation, and in their religious, philosophical and political outlooks. They began by engaging in a substantial consultation exercise. There were six weekend meetings with visiting speakers, and public hearings were arranged in Belfast, Birmingham, Cardiff, Glasgow, Leeds, Leicester and London. A booklet was published and widely distributed and more than 200 substantial responses to this were received. There were many visits to, and interviews with, key individuals, projects and organisations.

The patrons of the commission are Iqbal Sacranie, Rowan Williams, Bhikhu Parekh and Harry Woolf, Baron Woolf.

There was a special issue of the online magazine Public Spirit and a debate about the consultation in the House of Lords. It was from this mix of interactions and encounters, and from collective reflection on them, that their report was in due course distilled.

== Final report ==
On 7 December 2015 CORAB published its final report, The pattern of the report was as follows. In the first main chapter (chapter 2) there were notes on the key words in the commission’s title, religion and belief, and the ways they are sometimes linked to issues of nationality and ethnicity. Sometimes, the notes recalled, their meanings overlap and converge; sometimes they stand in mutual suspicion or hostility towards each other; sometimes there is synergy between them and a resulting synthesis. The following chapter (chapter 3) outlined the commission's general approach to dealing with such matters. This included a summary of its vision, which is of a society at ease with itself; a society in which individuals and communities feel at home as part of an ongoing national story; a society to which all its members wish to, and are encouraged to, contribute their energy, insights and wisdom to the common good. The next five chapters considered how the vision may be supported in education systems (chapter 4), through the print, broadcasting and social media (chapter 5), dialogue and engagement (chapter 6), social action (chapter 7) and civil and criminal law (chapter 8).

The commission made 37 recommendations, including the following:

- A national conversation should be launched across the UK by leaders of faith communities and ethical traditions to create a shared understanding of the fundamental values underlying public life. It would take place at all levels and in all regions. The outcome might be a statement of the principles and values which foster the common good, and which should underpin and guide public life.
- Much greater religion and belief literacy is needed in every section of society, and at all levels. The potential for misunderstanding, stereotyping and oversimplification based on ignorance is huge. The commission therefore calls on educational and professional bodies to draw up religion and belief literacy programmes and projects, including an annual awards scheme to recognise and celebrate best practice in the media.
- The pluralist character of modern society should be reflected in national and civic events so that they are more reflective of the UK’s increasing diversity, and in national forums such as the House of Lords, so that they include a wider range of worldviews and religious traditions, and of Christian denominations other than the Church of England.
- All pupils in state-funded schools should have a statutory entitlement to a curriculum about religion, philosophy and ethics that is relevant to today’s society, and the broad framework of such a curriculum should be nationally agreed. The legal requirement for schools to hold acts of collective worship should be repealed, and replaced by a requirement to hold inclusive times for reflection.
- Bodies responsible for admissions and employment policies in schools with a religious character (‘faith schools’) should take measures to reduce selection of pupils and staff on grounds of religion.
- The BBC Charter renewal should mandate the Corporation to reflect the range of religion and belief of modern society, for example by extending contributions to Radio 4’s daily religious flagship Thought for the Day to include speakers from non-religious perspectives such as humanists.
- A panel of experts on religion and belief should be established to advise the Independent Press Standards Organisation (IPSO) when there are complaints about the media coverage in this field.
- Relevant public bodies and voluntary organisations should promote opportunities for interreligious and inter-worldview encounter and dialogue. Such dialogue should involve Dharmic as well as Abrahamic traditions, young people as well as older, women as well as men, and local groups as well as national and regional ones. Clergy and other opinion leaders should have a sound understanding of the traditions of religion and belief in modern society.
- Where a religious organisation is best placed to deliver a social good, it should not be disadvantaged when applying for funding to do so, so long as its services are not aimed at seeking converts.
- The Ministry of Justice should issue guidance on compliance with UK standards of gender equality and judicial independence by religious and cultural tribunals such as ecclesiastical courts, Beit Din and Shari’a councils.
- The Ministry of Justice should instruct the Law Commission to review the anomalies in how the legal definitions of race, ethnicity and religion interact in practice and make recommendations to ensure all religious traditions are treated equally.
- In framing counter-terrorism legislation, the Government should seek to promote, not limit, freedom of enquiry, speech and expression, and should engage with a wide range of affected groups, including those with which it disagrees, and also with academic research. It should lead public opinion by challenging negative stereotyping and by speaking out in support of groups that may otherwise feel vulnerable and excluded.
