= Protestant ecclesiology =

Teachings held by Protestant denominations on ecclesiology

The term Protestant ecclesiology refers to the spectrum of teachings held by various Protestant denominations on the nature of the Christian Church.

== Teaching by Christian denomination ==
=== Evangelical-Lutheran Churches ===
==== Theology of grace ====
Martin Luther argued that because the Catholic church had "lost sight of the doctrine of grace", it had "lost its claim to be considered as the authenthic Christian church"; this argument was open to the counter-criticism from Catholics that he was thus guilty of schism and a Donatist position, and in both cases therefore opposing central teachings of Augustine of Hippo.

==== Ecclesia sancta catholica ====
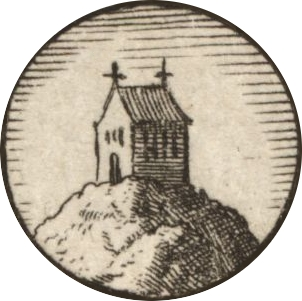
...one holy Church is to continue forever. The Church is the congregation of saints, in which the Gospel is rightly taught and the Sacraments are rightly administered. — Augsburg Confession

"Now, anywhere you hear or see such a word preached, believed, confessed, and acted upon, do not doubt that the true ecclesia sancta catholica, a 'holy Christian people' must be there..." "Luther's understanding of the church is thus functional, rather than historical: what legitimates a church or its office-bearers is not historical continuity with the apostolic church, but theological continuity."

The Evangelical-Lutheran Church views itself as the "main trunk of the historical Christian Tree" founded by Christ and the Apostles, holding that during the Reformation, the Church of Rome fell away. The Augsburg Confession found within the Book of Concord, a compendium of belief of the Evangelical-Lutheranes, teaches that "the faith as confessed by Luther and his followers is nothing new, but the true Catholic faith, and that their churches represent the true catholic or universal church". When the Lutherans presented the Augsburg Confession to Charles V, Holy Roman Emperor in 1530, they believe to have "showed that each article of faith and practice was true first of all to Holy Scripture, and then also to the teaching of the church fathers and the councils".

Evangelical-Lutheran theology therefore holds that:

There can only be one true visible Church. Of this our Catechism speaks in Question 192: "Whom do we call the true visible Church?" Answer: "The whole number of those who have, teach and confess the entire doctrine of the Word of God in all its purity, and among whom the Sacraments are duly administered according to Christ's institution." That there can be but one true visible Church, and that, therefore, one is not just as good as another stands to reason because there is only one truth, one Bible, one Word of God. Evidently that Church which teaches this truth, the whole truth, and nothing but the truth, is the true visible Church. Christ says John 8, 31. 32: "If ye continue in My Word, then are ye My disciples indeed; and ye shall know the truth, and the truth shall make you free." Again Christ says Matt. 28, 20: "Teaching them to observe all things whatsoever I have commanded you." Whatsoever He has commanded us, His Word, and nothing else, we should teach. And again, all things which He has commanded us we should teach. That, therefore is the true visible Church which does this. But that all visible Churches do not this is plain from the fact that they do not agree among themselves. If every Church would teach the whole truth and nothing but the truth as God has revealed it, there could be no difference. So, then, by calling other denominations Churches, we do not mean to say that one Church is just as good as another. Only that one is the true visible Church which teaches and confesses the entire doctrine of the Word of God in all its purity, and in whose midst the Sacraments are duly administered according to Christ's institution. Of all Churches, this can only be said of our Lutheran Church.

In the Evangelical-Lutheran Churches, the "Office of the Keys is the special authority which Christ has given to His Church on earth: to forgive the sins of the penitent sinners, but to retain the sins of the impenitent as long as they do not repent." Lutheran doctrine cites John 20:22–23 as the basis for the sacrament of Confession and Absolution.

==== Against denominationalism and schism ====
Yet Luther, at least as late as 1519, argued against denominationalism and schism, and the Augsburg Confession of 1530 can be interpreted (e.g. by McGrath 1998) as conciliatory (others, e.g. Rasmussen and Thomassen 2007, marshalling evidence, argue that Augsburg was not conciliatory but clearly impossible for the Roman Catholic Church to accept). "Luther's early views on the nature of the church reflect his emphasis on the Word of God: the Word of God goes forth conquering, and wherever it conquers and gains true obedience to God is the church."

==== Sacramental validity ====
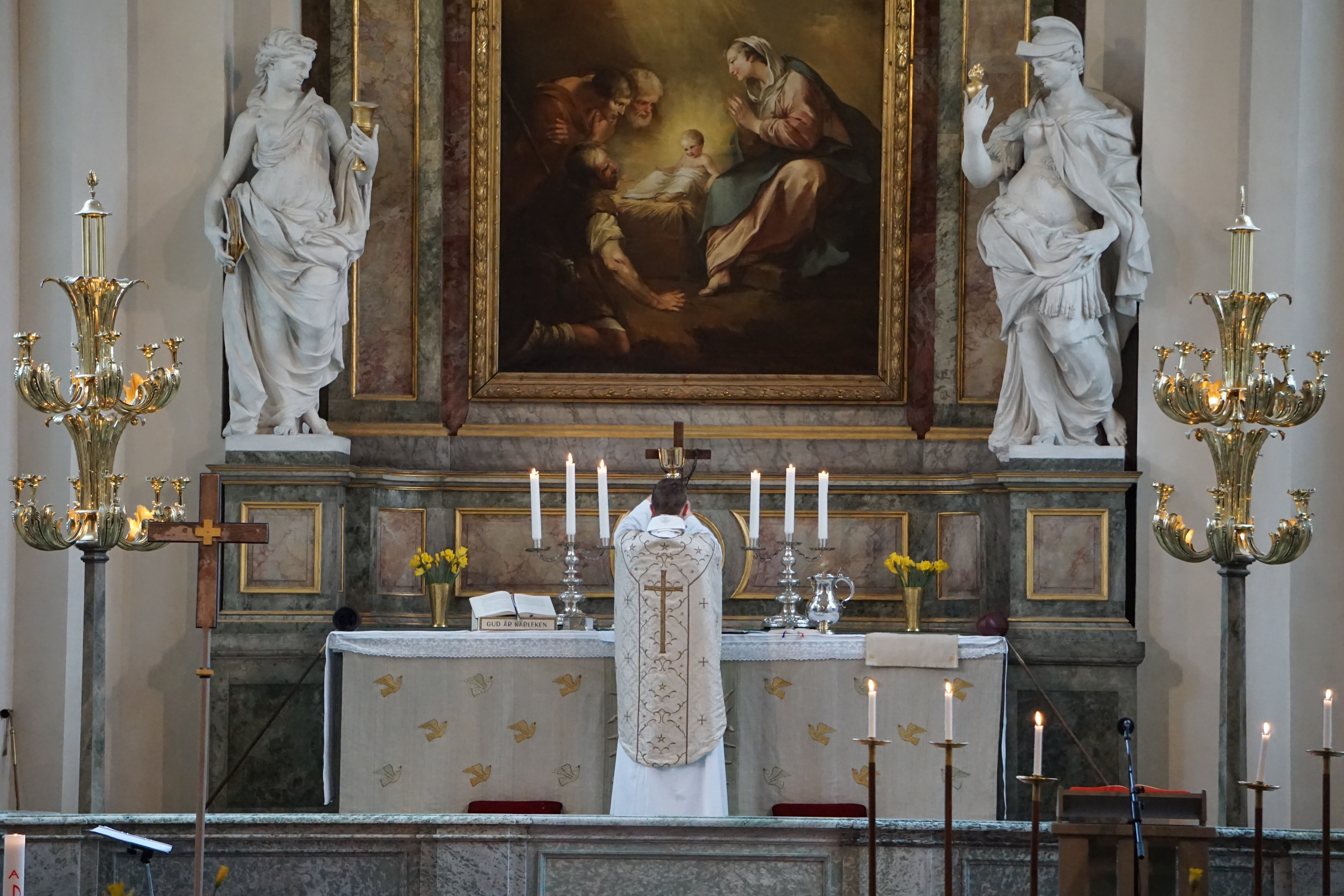
Evangelical-Lutheran priest elevating the chalice during the Mass at Maria Magdalena Church, Sweden

Though Evangelical-Lutherans are not dogmatic about the number of sacraments, three Lutheran sacraments are generally recognized including baptism, confession, and the eucharist.

In Evangelical-Lutheran theology, sacraments are "effective and valid in as much as they enacted the Word of God". Proper intent with regard to the external act contributes to sacramental validity as well, for example, the presider's intent to consecrate the "very body and blood of Christ" in the celebration of the Mass. This affects the recognition of sacramental validity in other Christian denominations, in view with the Evangelical Lutheran reading of Scripture as teaching the real presence of Christ in the Eucharist. As such, Evangelical-Lutherans recognize the celebration of the Eucharist in the Roman Catholic Church, Eastern Orthodox Churches and Oriental Orthodox Churches, but Evangelical-Lutherans do not recognize the sacramental validity of the Lord's Supper as it is celebrated in the Baptist Churches (who reject this Evangelical-Lutheran dogma of the corporeal presence).

==== Nomenclature ====
Evangelical Lutheranism derives from the word "evangelical" (derived from εὐαγγέλιον euangelion, a Greek word meaning "good news", i.e. "Gospel") and "Lutheran" in reference to Martin Luther, who contributed to the development of the tradition. The Evangelical Lutheran Catechism notes that the church uses the term "Evangelical" to show "her adherence to the pure evangelical or gospel doctrines, and to the Scriptures in general".

=== Reformed (Continental Reformed, Presbyterian, Anglican and Congregationalist) tradition ===
==== Systematic ecclesiology ====
John Calvin is among those working, primarily after Martin Luther, in the second generation of Reformers, to develop a more systematic doctrine of the church (i.e. ecclesiology) in the face of the emerging reality of a split with the Catholic Church, with the failure of the ecumenical Colloquy of Regensburg in 1541, and the Council of Trent's condemnation in 1545 of "the leading ideas of Protestantism". Thus, Calvin's ecclesiology is progressively more systematic.

==== Emphasis on the Sovereignty of God ====
The second edition of Calvin's Institutes of the Christian Religion in 1539 holds that "the marks of the true church [are] that the Word of God should be preached, and that the sacraments be rightly administered". Later, Calvin developed the theory of the fourfold office of pastor, doctor (or teacher), elder, and deacon, possibly owing to the colleagueship with Martin Bucer and his own experience of leadership in church communities.

==== Visible and invisible church ====
Calvin also discusses the visible church and the invisible church; the visible church is the community of Christian believers; the invisible church is the fellowship of saints and the company of the elect; both must be honoured; "there is only one church, a single entity with Jesus Christ as its head" (McGrath); the visible church will include the good and the evil, a teaching found in the patristic tradition of Augustine and rooted in the divine teaching, recorded in the Gospel according to Matthew, of the Parable of the Tares (Mt 13:24-31); thus, Calvin held that it is "not the quality of its members, but the presence of the authorised means of grace, [that] constitutes a true church" (McGrath).

==== Concerns about fragmentation ====
Calvin was concerned to avoid further fragmentation, i.e. splits among the Evangelical churches: "I am saying that we should not desert a church on account of some minor disagreement, if it upholds sound doctrine over the essentials of piety, and maintains the use of the sacraments established by the Lord."

=== Anabaptism ===
There is no single "Radical Reformation Ecclesiology." A variety of views is expressed among the various "Radical Reformation" participants.

A key "Radical Reformer" was Menno Simons, known as an "Anabaptist". He wrote:

They verily are not the true congregation of Christ who merely boast of his name. But they are the true congregation of Christ who are truly converted, who are born from above of God, who are of a regenerate mind by the operation of the Holy Spirit through the hearing of the divine Word, and have become the children of God, have entered into obedience to him, and live unblamably in his holy commandments, and according to his holy will with all their days, or from the moment of their call.

This was in direct contrast to the hierarchical, sacramental ecclesiology that characterized the incumbent Roman Catholic tradition as well as the new Lutheran and other prominent Protestant movements of the Reformation.

Some other Radical Reformation ecclesiology holds that "the true church [is] in heaven, and no institution of any kind on earth merit[s] the name 'church of God.'"

=== Methodism ===
A more conservative analysis of ecclesiology was given in the mid-20th century by the Methodist Robert Newton Flew.

== See also ==
- Marks of the Church (Protestantism)
