= Michael Volland =

British Anglican bishop and academic

The Right Reverend Michael Volland
- Bishop of Birmingham
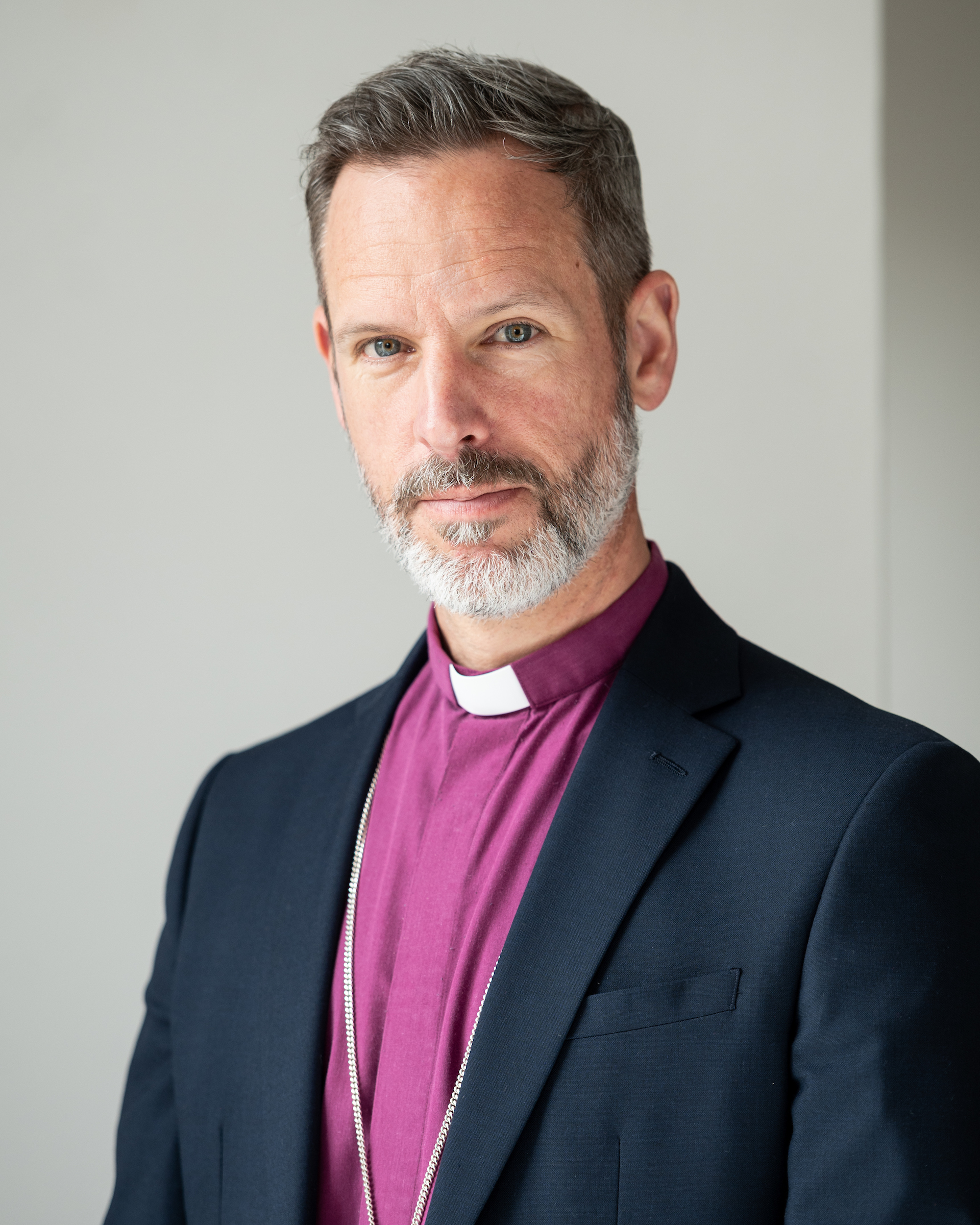
- Volland in 2024
- Church: Church of England
- Diocese: Diocese of Birmingham
- In office: 22 November 2023 – present
- Other post: Principal of Ridley Hall, Cambridge (2017–2023)

Orders
- Ordination: 2006 (deacon); 2007 (priest)
- Consecration: 30 November 2023 by Justin Welby

Personal details
- Born: Michael John Volland; 2 May 1974 (age 52)
- Denomination: Anglicanism
- Spouse: Rachel
- Children: Three
- Education: King's College London; Ridley Hall, Cambridge; St John's College, Durham

Michael John Volland (born 2 May 1974) is a British Anglican bishop and academic, specialising in mission and practical theology. Since November 2023, he has been the tenth Bishop of Birmingham, the diocesan bishop of the Church of England's Diocese of Birmingham. From 2017 to 2023, he was Principal of Ridley Hall, Cambridge, an Anglican theological college in the Open Evangelical tradition. He was previously Director of Mission at Cranmer Hall, Durham, and Director of Context-based Training at Ridley Hall.

== Early life and education ==
Volland was born in 1974. He grew up in Reading, Berkshire. Having attended a state school in Reading, he went on to undertake a foundation course in art and design. He then studied fine art at Northumbria University, graduating with a Bachelor of Arts (BA) degree in 1996.

For six years, prior to entering theological college, Volland worked as a youth minister. He studied youth ministry and theological education at King's College London, and completed a Master of Arts (MA) degree in 2004. From 2004 to 2006, he trained for ordained ministry at Ridley Hall, Cambridge, an Anglican theological college in the open evangelical tradition.

Volland later undertook postgraduate research at Durham University, and completed a Doctor of Theology and Ministry (DThM) degree in 2013. His doctoral thesis was titled "An entrepreneurial approach to priestly ministry in the parish: insights from a research study in the Diocese of Durham".

== Ordained ministry ==
Volland was ordained in the Church of England as a deacon in 2006 and as a priest in 2007. He served as a pioneer minister leading a fresh expressions church in Gloucester between 2006 and 2009, and was also a curate of Gloucester Cathedral from 2006 to 2009. In 2009, he joined Cranmer Hall, Durham as tutor and Director of Mission. From 2014 to 2015, he was also missioner/leader of the East Durham Mission Project, and acting area dean of Easington, County Durham. The East Durham Mission Project is a group of nine parishes in former mining communities in the Diocese of Durham.

In 2015, Volland was appointed a tutor and Director of Context-based Training of Ridley Hall, Cambridge, and so he left the Diocese of Durham to move south in August 2015. Since 2015, he has also held permission to officiate in the Diocese of Ely. In December 2016, it was announced that he would be the next Principal of Ridley Hall. He took up the position in January 2017.

On 31 August 2023, it was announced that Volland would be the next Bishop of Birmingham, the diocesan bishop of the Diocese of Birmingham. He legally took up his See at the confirmation of his election on 22 November. He was consecrated a bishop during a service at Canterbury Cathedral on 30 November 2023. He was installed of the tenth Bishop of Birmingham during a service at Birmingham Cathedral on 2 March 2024.

=== Military service ===
In addition to his parish and academic ministries, Volland has served as a military chaplain. On 25 February 2013, he was commissioned in the Royal Army Chaplains' Department as a Chaplain to the Forces Fourth Class (equivalent in rank to captain). He then joined the Durham Army Cadet Force as a chaplain. On moving to Cambridge in 2015, he resigned his commission.

== Personal life ==
Volland is married to Rachel. Together they have three children.

== Selected works ==
- Volland, Michael (2005). God on the beach. Eastbourne: Survivor. ISBN 978-1842912287.
- Volland, Michael (2009). Through the pilgrim door. Eastbourne: Survivor Books. ISBN 978-1842913994.
- Goodhew, David; Roberts, Andrew; Volland, Michael (2012). Fresh!: an introduction to fresh expressions of church and pioneer ministry. London: SCM Press. ISBN 978-0334043874.
- Volland, Michael (2015). The Minister as Entrepreneur: Leading and Growing the Church in an Age of Rapid Change. London: SPCK Publishing. ISBN 978-0281071821.
