= Bolaji Idowu =

Methodist church leader (1913–1993)

E Bolaji Idowu (1913–1995) was the third native-born leader of the Methodist Church Nigeria, serving from 1972 to 1984. He is also well known for his ethnographic and theological studies of the Yoruba people.

== Life ==
Idowu was born on 28 September 1913, in Ikorodu, Lagos State, Nigeria. His early education was at the Anglican and Methodist schools in Ikorodu. There, he met the Rev. A. T. Ola Olude and was converted to Christianity. After finishing at Wesley College in Ibadan, he became headmaster at the primary school in Remo, Ogun State. He was ordained in 1942.

From 1945 to 1948, he continued his studies at Wesley House, Cambridge. From 1957 to 1958, he was posted in Germany in an effort to resolve some of the problems that were facing African and Asian students there. In 1958 he joined the staff of the Department of Religious Studies at the University of Ibadan and served as its head from 1963 to 1976.

== Church leader ==
In 1972, he was elected president of the Methodist Church Nigeria. He immediately initiated a reform of the church's constitution, emphasizing the need for autonomy and indigenization. The new constitution was ratified in 1976, whereupon Idowu became the church's patriarch. Church members held him in such high esteem that items he had touched during his services were believed to have healing powers. He retired in 1984 and died in 1993. A cathedral in Ikorodu was named in his honor.

== Ethnotheology ==
In the process of preparing a doctoral thesis for the University of London (in 1955), Idowu discovered that all the available material on African religion appeared to be inaccurate, condescending or simply ridiculous. (For example: Leo Frobenius's belief that the Yoruba religion came from Plato's Atlantis by way of Egypt.) As a result, he set out to describe the religious beliefs of his own Yoruba people according to universal theological concerns such as the nature of the Deity, morality, and the ultimate destiny of mankind.

== Publications ==
- Olódùmarè : God in Yoruba Belief, New York, N.Y., Wazobia (1994) ISBN 1-886832-00-5
- African Traditional Religion: a Definition, Maryknoll, N.Y., Orbis Books (1973) ISBN 0-88344-005-9
- Olódùmarè: God in Yoruba Belief, Ikeja : Longman Nigeria (1982) ISBN 0-582-60803-1
- Towards an Indigenous Church, London, Oxford University Press (1965)
- Obituary: God’s or Man’s,” an inaugural lecture delivered at the University of Ibadan on Thursday, October 24, (1974).

== See also ==
- Yoruba religion
