= Michael Gutteridge =

English Methodist and businessman (1842–1935)

- Born: 1842
- Died: 1935 (aged 92–93)
- Occupations: Methodist and businessman

Michael Gutteridge (1842–1935) was an English Methodist and businessman who founded a successful drapery business in Naples, and the Wesley House seminary in Cambridge, England. The Italian fashion brand Gutteridge still exists, using the strapline "dal 1878" ("since 1878") as part of its image.

== Personal life ==
Gutteridge was born in Selby, Yorkshire. He married Ada Cooke (died 1921), daughter of Samuel Cooke, a carpet mill owner from Liversedge, Yorkshire. Their son Harold Cooke Gutteridge (1876–1953) was a notable jurist. Gutteridge died on 26 May 1935.

== Business life ==
Gutteridge's first shop was in Piazza Dante, where he sold cotton and woollen textiles; his father-in-law was a major Yorkshire based textile manufacturer. When the store opened he made the financially difficult decision not to trade on Sundays as other local businesses did, and "the sensation that he caused by so doing seemed to earn him admiration, goodwill and success".

It has been stated by the Gutteridge company that Matilde Serao's 1901 novel The Ballerina has a shop assistant at Gutteridge's as the central character; another source states that Gutteridge himself appears in the novel as "the Englishman" described as "il justo" [sic], "the just man".

== Possible Scottish heritage ==
The website of the Gutteridge company as of February 2019 describes Gutteridge as Scottish (fondato ... dallo scozzese Michael Gutteridge) and asserts that his father-in-law was the principal textile producer in Scotland (con il supporto del suocero allora principale produttore tessile in Scozia), but other sources agree that he was born in Selby and that his father-in-law was Samuel Cooke of Liversedge, Yorkshire.
