= Robert Newton Flew =

English Methodist minister and theologian (1886-1962)

Robert Newton Flew (1886–1962) was an English Methodist minister and theologian, and an advocate of ecumenism among the Christian churches. He was the father of Antony Flew.

== Family and education ==
Robert Newton Flew was born at Holsworthy, Devon, on 25 May 1886, the older son of Josiah Flew (1859–1925), a Wesleyan Methodist minister, and his wife, Florence Jones (1863–1964). Originally from Portland, Dorset, the family moved during Flew's childhood to Wiltshire and Warwickshire, and then to the suburbs of London. There Flew won a scholarship in 1897 to the independent school Christ's Hospital, followed by a "postmastership" (scholarship) to Merton College, Oxford, where he read classics and theology. While at Merton, Flew contributed to debates within the university on international affairs. He spent a term in Bonn and Marburg in 1909.

== Ministry ==
While training for the Wesleyan ministry, Flew taught theology and classics at Handsworth College. He spent five years from 1913 as a circuit minister in Winchmore Hill, North London, during which time he made study visits to Italy and Switzerland and first made close acquaintance with Catholics. He then volunteered as a naval chaplain, although the Armistice had already been signed before he set sail for 18 months in Mesopotamia. He spent a further 18 months at United Theological College, Bangalore, India.

On his return to England, Flew married in July 1921 Winifred Garrard (1887–1982), a Wesleyan Methodist teacher – their son Antony Garrard Newton Flew (1923–2010) was to become a prominent philosopher and advocate of "the presumption of atheism". He spent the next six years in a circuit ministry in London, where he built up strong ecumenical relations. His friendship with the Austrian Catholic theologian Baron von Hügel led him to a closer study of spirituality, resulting in a book, The Idea of Perfection in Christian Theology (1934), which remained in print for many years. For this he was awarded a doctorate of divinity by the University of Oxford, the first ever for a non-Anglican.

The book was described quite recently by a fellow theologian as "a comprehensive interpretation of Christian ethics as promulgated by Jesus, right on down through those whom Flew subsequently identifies as the most significant Christian thinkers of the last two thousand years." It shows Flew to be one of several Methodist theologians in the mid-20th century to have become critical of the ideas of John Wesley on sinlessness and purity of intention: "Flew critiques Wesley's attitude to sin as offering only an inadequate account of moral evil," so that he can "posit an over-optimistic instantaneous end to the effects of sin... The result of these problems is an 'intramundane asceticism', whereby the one assured of sanctification merely endures secular life, allowing a barrier to exist between one's work and worship."

In 1927 Flew was appointed Greenhalgh professor of New Testament language and literature at Wesley House, Cambridge, a theological college founded in 1921, of which he was principal from 1937 to 1955. He became a keen contributor to the Cambridge New Testament Seminar, held under the chairmanship up to 1935 of Francis Crawford Burkitt, leaving an account of it in an obituary for Burkett in the Proceedings of the British Academy. He was to remain in Cambridge for the rest of his life. Flew took a prominent part in the 1932 reunion of the Wesleyan Methodists with the United Methodists and the Primitive Methodists as the Methodist Church of Great Britain.

On the academic side, one recent scholar concluded, "The Idea of Perfection in Christian Theology (1934) was a meticulous piece of scholarship on a theme dear to Methodist hearts, though it was as an ecclesiologist that Flew would exert widest influence on Protestant thought." This refers to his book Jesus and his Church (1938), based on a lecture delivered to the Methodist Conference in that year, which stated concisely the premise: "The Church is old in the sense that it is a continuation of the life of Israel, the People of God. It is new in the sense that it is founded on the revelation made through Jesus Christ of God's final purpose for mankind." Particularly relevant at the time was the incisive contribution it made to the then current debate on episcopacy, by showing "the early [Christian] communities to have been independent and unstructured."

Flew's reputation as a scholar and churchman extended far beyond the faculty of divinity in Cambridge. He was elected moderator of the Free Church Federal Council for 1945–1946 and president of the Methodist Conference in 1946–1947. He gave strong support to the ecumenical Church of South India. In relation to Anglicanism, he co-edited with Rupert E. Davies a report entitled The Catholicity of Protestantism (1950). Having attended several pre-war preparatory conferences, he was appointed vice-chairman of the provisional committee of the World Council of Churches after the war and took a leading part in its inaugural meeting in Amsterdam in 1948. For a further meeting of the World Council of Churches at Lund in 1952, he edited a volume, The Nature of the Church (1950). In retirement he edited the London Quarterly and Holborn Review and worked on a further book, Jesus and His Way, which was published posthumously in 1963. He gave support to the beginnings of Anglican–Methodist dialogue at the Methodist conference in 1955.

Flew died in Cambridge on 10 September 1962.

== Bibliography ==
Details have been taken from the British Library Integrated Catalogue.

=== Biography ===
- Gordon Stevens Wakefield: Robert Newton Flew, 1886–1962 (London: Epworth Press, 1971). ISBN 0-7162-0186-0

=== Works ===
- The Teaching of the Apostles (1915)
- The Forgiveness of Sins (London: C. H. Kelly, 1916)
- The Excavations and Discoveries in Mesopotamia and their Bearing on the Book of Genesis... (Basrah: Government Press, 1919)
- The Idea of Perfection in Christian Theology. An historical study of the Christian ideal for the present life (London: OUP, 1934)
- Jesus and His Church. A study of the idea of the Ecclesia in the New Testament... (London: Epworth Press, 1938; last reprint: Carlisle: Paternoster, 1998). Fernley-Hartley lecture
- The Hymns of Charles Wesley. A study of their structure (London: Epworth Press, 1953). Wesley Historical Society lecture
- Jesus and His Way. A study of the ethics of the New Testament (London: Epworth Press, 1963)

=== As editor ===
- With W. R. Maltby: Manuals of Fellowship (London, 1916 onwards)
- With Ernest H. Hayes: Methodist Senior Notes (London, 1935–1942)
- With Ernest H. Hayes: Methodist Young People's Notes (London, 1945–1950)
- With Rupert E. Davies: The Catholicity of Protestantism. Being a report presented to His Grace the Archbishop of Canterbury by a group of Free Churchmen (London: Lutterworth Press, 1950, reprint 1951)
- The Nature of the Church: Papers presented to the Theological Commission appointed by the Continuation Committee of the World Conference on Faith and Order (London: SCM Press, 1952)
