= Portrait of Margaret Thatcher =

Painting by Richard Stone

- Baroness Thatcher
- Artist: Richard Stone
- Year: 2009
- Medium: Oil on canvas
- Subject: Margaret Thatcher
- Dimensions: 40 in (100 cm) × 28 in (71 cm)
- Location: 10 Downing Street
- Owner: Cabinet Office
- Commissioner: Gordon Brown
- Website: Richard Stone

The Downing Street portrait of Margaret Thatcher, Baroness Thatcher, by the artist Richard Stone was completed in 2009.

== Description ==
Thatcher is portrayed as wearing a dark suit with pearls. The portrait depicts Thatcher in 1982, shortly after the conclusion of the Falklands War. Stone chose to portray her in the immediate aftermath of the war as he felt that there was " ... something very distinctive about her look, not just facially but the clothes that she wore, her whole demeanour". Stone described Thatcher as being notable for her " ... beautiful, elegant presentation, a lady who we can all recall as always being very smartly dressed" and that it was "necessary to record the intelligence, the intellect, the stamina, the strength, the steeliness". Thatcher was suffering from dementia at the time of the completion of the portrait and told Stone upon seeing it that it was "lovely" and that he had made her look "so nice". Stone had previously painted four other portraits of Thatcher.

== History ==
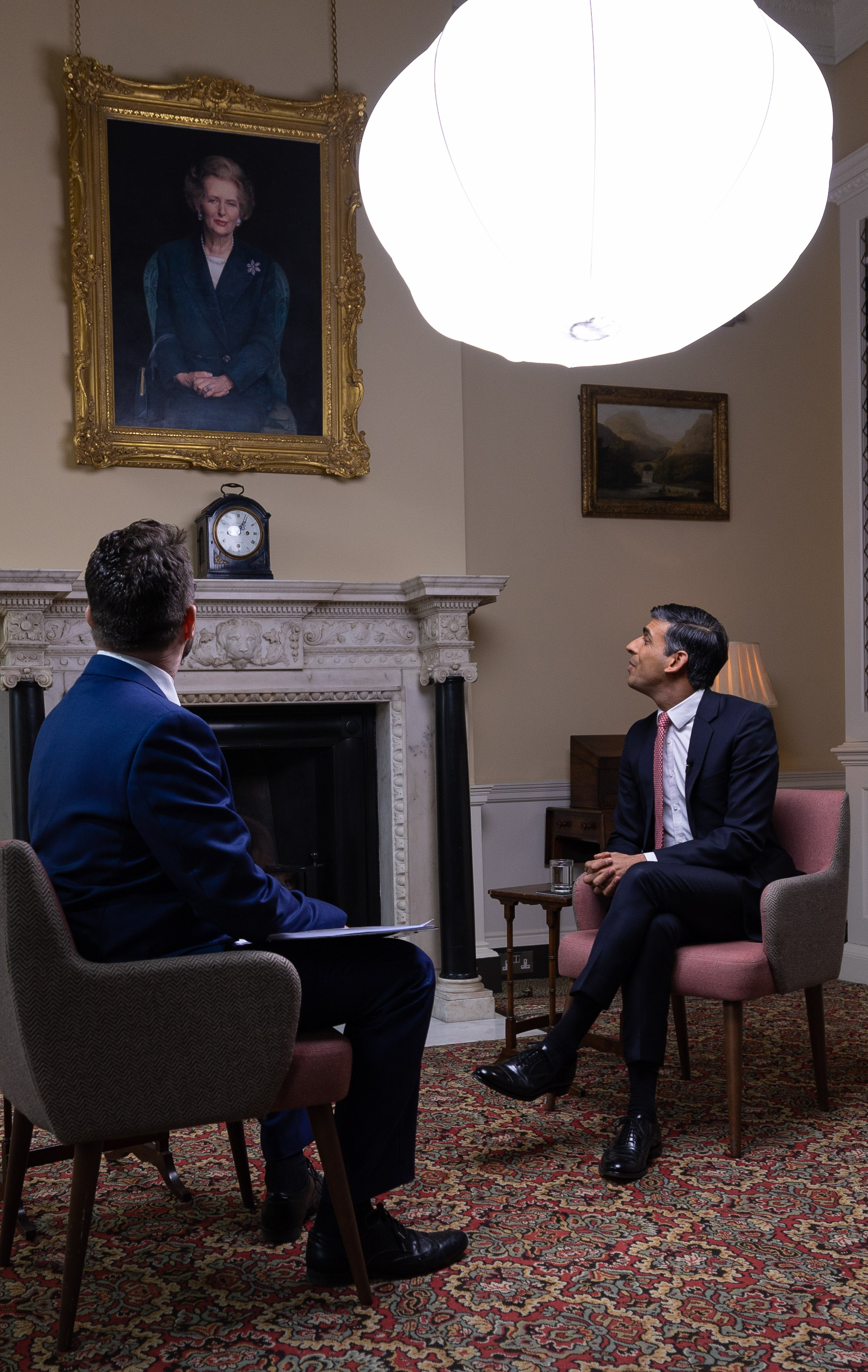
The portrait as it hung in Rishi Sunak's study, 2023

The portrait was commissioned by Prime Minister Gordon Brown in 2007. Brown had offered Thatcher the honour of a painted portrait after meeting her for tea at 10 Downing Street in September 2007. The cost of the portrait in 2009 was £100,000, which was funded by an anonymous donor. Thatcher was only the third prime minister to have a painted portrait on display at Number 10 after Winston Churchill and David Lloyd George.

Thatcher attended the unveiling of the portrait at Number 10 on 23 November 2009. She was greeted on the steps of Number 10 by Gordon Brown and his wife, Sarah. It was unveiled at a private reception that day and was put on permanent display in the vestibule on the first floor lobby of Number 10. The portrait then hung in the study of Number 10 which became unofficially known as the Thatcher Room.

In October 2022 an earlier version of the portrait dating from 2004 was sold from the collection of businessman and Conservative Party donor Stuart Wheeler at auction for £35,000. It had hung at Chilham Castle, Wheeler's residence in Kent.

In August 2024 the biographer of Prime Minister Keir Starmer, Tom Baldwin, said that in a conversation with Starmer, he had said that the portrait was " ... a bit unsettling with her staring down at you like that, isn't it?" with which Starmer had agreed. Baldwin asked Starmer if he would "get rid of it" and Starmer reportedly nodded in the affirmative. Baldwin subsequently said that he believed the portrait had been moved to a different part of Number 10 "or that's what's planned". After criticism, it was confirmed that the portrait still hung in Number 10 but had been moved to a meeting room on the first floor. Speaking to Sunday with Laura Kuenssberg in September 2024, Starmer explained that the portrait was not moved out of dislike for Thatcher "at all" but because he "didn't want a picture of anyone" in the study, preferring landscapes.
