= Richard Stone (anti-racism activist) =

British doctor and activist (1937–2024)

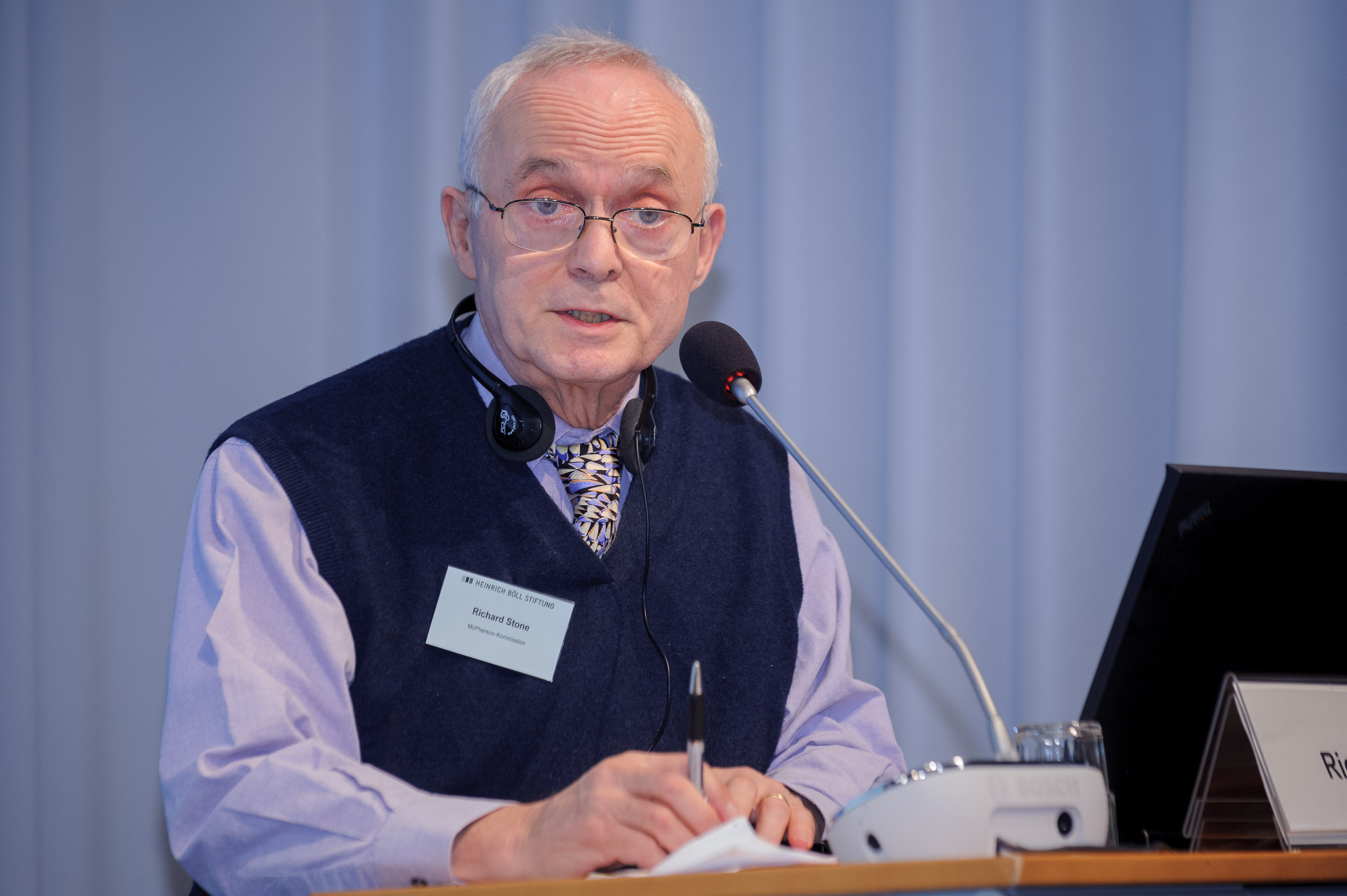
- Stone in 2012
- Born: 9 March 1937
- Died: 5 March 2024 (aged 86)
- Father: Joseph Stone, Baron Stone
- Relatives: Arnold Silverstone, Baron Ashdown (uncle); Sidney Bernstein, Baron Bernstein (uncle)

Richard Malcolm Ellis Stone OBE (9 March 1937 – 5 March 2024) was a British medical doctor, social campaigner and philanthropist. Stone was best known for his association with the Runnymede Trust and the Jewish Council for Racial Equality on issues of race and politics, as well as race and society more generally in the United Kingdom. Stone was appointed to the panel of the Stephen Lawrence inquiry; a case involving a Black teenager who was murdered in London in 1993; which eventually led to the Macpherson Report, which defined the British Metropolitan Police's response to the incident as "institutionally racist." Stone was also noted for his association with the Jewish interfaith group The Woolf Institute.

== Anti-racism and inter-faith work ==
Stone worked as a political activist on issues of race and politics, as well as race and society in the United Kingdom. He was in the campaign arising around the Stephen Lawrence murder after sitting on the panel of the Stephen Lawrence Inquiry. Stone served as a Cabinet Advisor to the Mayor of London, President of the Jewish Council for Racial Equality, and spent five years on the Runnymede Trust's ‘Commission on British Muslims and Islamophobia’, from 2000 to 2004 as chair. He was also a trustee and vice-Chair of the Runnymede Trust and a Council and Board member of Liberty. For 14 years he was the chair of the Islamophobia Commission, set up by the Runnymede Trust in 1996, working with British Muslims.

Stone was a member of the Home Office's Working Groups on Tackling Extremism Together.

Much of his work was to bring together British Jews and British Muslims. He was a founding trustee of the Maimonides Foundation in 1985 and in 2004 he founded Alif-Aleph UK (British Muslims and British Jews).

Stone was an Honorary Fellow and Inter Faith Patron of the Woolf Institute, a Centre for Muslim-Jewish Relations at the University of Cambridge and a visiting fellow in the criminology department of the University of Westminster.

== Stephen Lawrence Inquiry ==
In the 'Stephen Lawrence Inquiry' into racism in policing from 1997–99, Stone was appointed to the panel of the Stephen Lawrence Inquiry, which was led by Sir William Macpherson. In 2013 he published the book Hidden Stories of the Stephen Lawrence Inquiry, documenting his personal experience on the Inquiry and raising concerns about the way the Inquiry was managed. In 2003–04 he sat on the panel of the NHS David Bennett Inquiry.

== Personal life and death ==
In 2010 Stone was appointed an OBE for "public and voluntary" service.

Stone died on 5 March 2024, at the age of 86.

== See also ==
- Anthony Lester, Baron Lester of Herne Hill
- Jim Rose (journalist)
