= Olodumare: God in Yoruba Belief =

Non-fiction book by Bolaji E. Idowu

- Cover of the second edition
- Author: Bolaji E. Idowu
- Language: English
- Subject: Theology
- Publisher: Longman (UK); Original Publications (US)
- Publication date: 1962
- Publication place: UK
- Media type: Print (Hardcover and Paperback)
- Pages: 222
- ISBN: 1-59232-951-9

Olodumare: God in Yoruba Belief is a non-fiction book by Nigerian theologian Bolaji E. Idowu, published in 1962. Concerning the conception of God in Yoruba thought, the worship of deities and the structure of Yoruba religion, the book is considered to be one of the first comprehensive studies on the subject.

== Content ==
"This work of great importance was written at a time when African traditional religions were of no significance in the world and at a time when Africans, the original people of the earth were claimed not to have the knowledge of God. This classic in the annals of African traditional religion and specifically the works of Idowu disproves that myth and notion."

— back cover of Olodumare: God in Yoruba Belief

The book aims at constructing a framework of Yoruba theology, and drawing from information on Yoruba religion, history, and tradition, it covers a relatively obscure belief system and sheds light on the Supreme Deity Ọlọrun and other divinities and the mechanics of their worship.
