= Institute for Orthodox Christian Studies =

Theological college in Cambridge

The Institute for Orthodox Christian Studies (IOCS) is a theological college in Cambridge, England. It works in collaboration with the University of Cambridge and Anglia Ruskin University and awards its degree programs through these universities. IOCS is the only Christian Orthodox institute for higher education in the UK and the only academic institution teaching the Orthodox faith in English anywhere in western Europe. Along with other theological colleges in Cambridge, it is a member of the Cambridge Theological Federation. The institute adopts a holistic approach to learning that integrates academic study with a liturgical life.

== History and vision ==
The idea of an Orthodox institute was conceived after Metropolitan Anthony of Sourozh was awarded an honorary doctorate in 1996 by the University of Cambridge. The institute was established and received the first admission of students in 1999. The declared aims of the institute, as expressed in its memorandum and articles of association, are "to advance religious and theological education, particularly of members of the Orthodox Church." Following that event, at the initiative of Father John Jillions who was at the time working on his doctoral project at Tyndale House in Cambridge, and with the support of Metropolitan Anthony, an Orthodox Working Group started meeting between 1998 and 1999 with the express purpose of researching the possibility of establishing an Orthodox Institute in Cambridge. The Working Group included – besides Father John Jillions – Metropolitan Kallistos Ware, representatives from the Faculty of Divinity in Cambridge and the Cambridge Theological Federation and other influential scholars and figures. The institute was eventually established and received the first admission of students in 1999, with Revd Dr John Jillions as its first Principal. The declared aims of the Institute, as expressed in its memorandum and articles of association, are "to advance religious and theological education, particularly of members of the Orthodox Church."

IOCS was founded 2 March 1999 as a registered charity and limited company in England and Wales. It became a member of the Cambridge Theological Federation in the same year. In 2012 the Orthodox Episcopal Assembly for Great Britain and Ireland recognized, approved and blessed IOCS as an educational centre and appointed one of its bishops, Metropolitan Kallistos Ware, to be the institute's first president. Concordant with the teaching at IOCS, he was also an advocate for teaching the Orthodox faith in English.

The Institute was initially based within Wesley House (1999-2013), the Methodist college in Cambridge on Jesus Lane who at the time also hosted the offices of the Cambridge Theological Federation and of other theological houses in Cambridge. In 2013, following the downscaling of Wesley House’s operations, the institute moved briefly to a building at 25-27 Chesterton High Street, Cambridge. Since 2018 the Institute has returned to the newly reconfigured Wesley House on Jesus Lane, being now based at 31 Jesus Lane CB5 8BJ.

In 2013 the institute acquired its own premises in Palamas House on Chesterton High Street, Cambridge.

== Organisation and administration ==
As a pan-Orthodox foundation, the institute is not maintained by any one branch of the Orthodox Church. It is supported by donations from a number of educational trusts and benefactors.

Biannual meetings of company members elect the chairman and directors. The directors also serve as trustees of the charity. The directors select a treasurer and a secretary for the company and appoint the principal, to whom is entrusted the day-to-day management of the institute with the advice of an executive committee of the board comprising the principal, the chairman of the board and the treasurer. Since 2012 the institute has also had a president, who is appointed by the Orthodox Episcopal Assembly for Great Britain and Ireland and serves as a liaison between the institute and the Assembly of Bishops. The first appointed president was Metropolitan Kallistos Ware.

== Educational programs ==
A wide range of courses are offered by the institute designed to facilitate inquiry and understanding of the Orthodox tradition at all levels from introductory courses in the Orthodox faith to specialist doctorate research projects. Current programs include:

- The Way - an introduction to the Orthodox faith
- Distance Learning Certificate in Orthodox Christian Studies
- Distance Learning Diploma in Orthodox Christian Studies

=== University courses ===
Some courses and degree programs are provided in partnership with the University of Cambridge and Anglia Ruskin University:

- Certificate in Theology for Ministry (CTM)
- Bachelor of Theology for Ministry (BTh)
- BA in Theology and Religious Studies
- MA in Pastoral Theology
- Master of Philosophy (MPhil)
- Doctor of Philosophy (PhD)

The institute also organises an annual series of conferences entitled Community Lecture Days. In 2014 the theme of the lectures was "Orthodoxy in the contemporary world".

== Liturgical life ==
Vespers is normally held in the institute library on Wednesdays evenings. As a pan-Orthodox house, the institute also encourages students to attach themselves to one of the other Orthodox congregations in Cambridge.
