= Wesley House =

Methodist UK theological college

- Theological college
- Cambridge Theological Federation
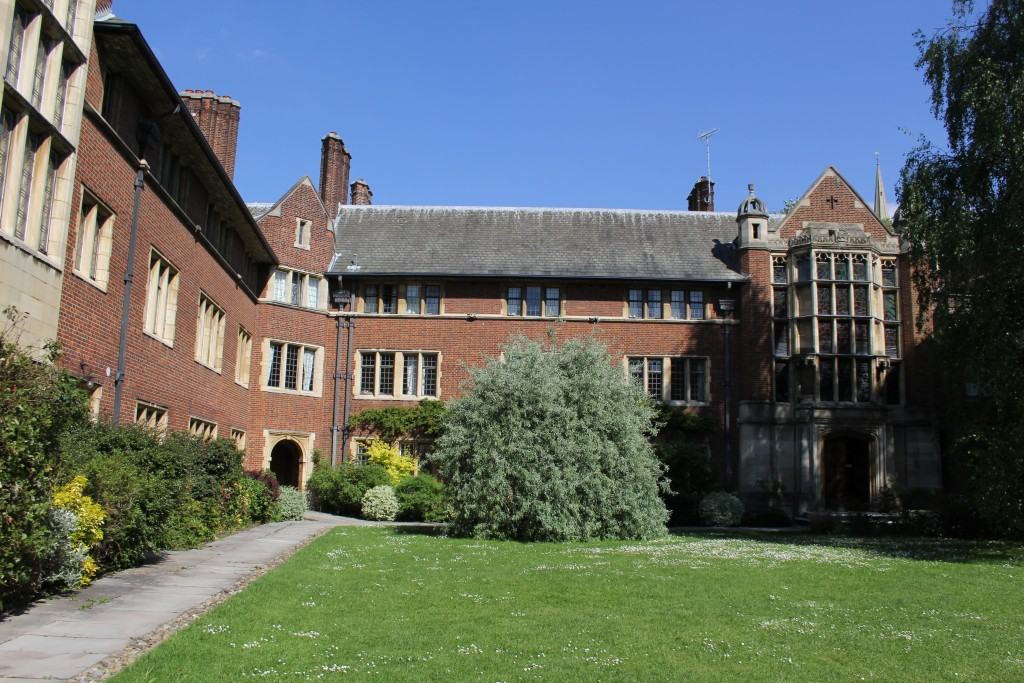
- Location: Cambridge, Cambridgeshire, England
- Coordinates: 52°12′32″N 0°7′18″E
- Established: 1921
- Named for: John Wesley
- Principal: The Revd Dr Jane Leach
- Website: wesley.cam.ac.uk

Wesley House is a Methodist theological college in Jesus Lane, Cambridge, England. It opened in 1921 as a place for the education of Methodist ministers and today supports theological students and scholars of the Wesleyan and Methodist traditions from around the world. It was a founding member of the Cambridge Theological Federation, an ecumenical body of theological colleges in Cambridge which is affiliated to but independent of the University of Cambridge.

== History ==
The college was founded and endowed by Michael Gutteridge, a Methodist businessman in Naples, well known in Italy for philanthropy. After four years at 2 Brookside, Cambridge, in co-operation with Cheshunt College, it moved in 1925 to its present site, which was purchased from Jesus College.

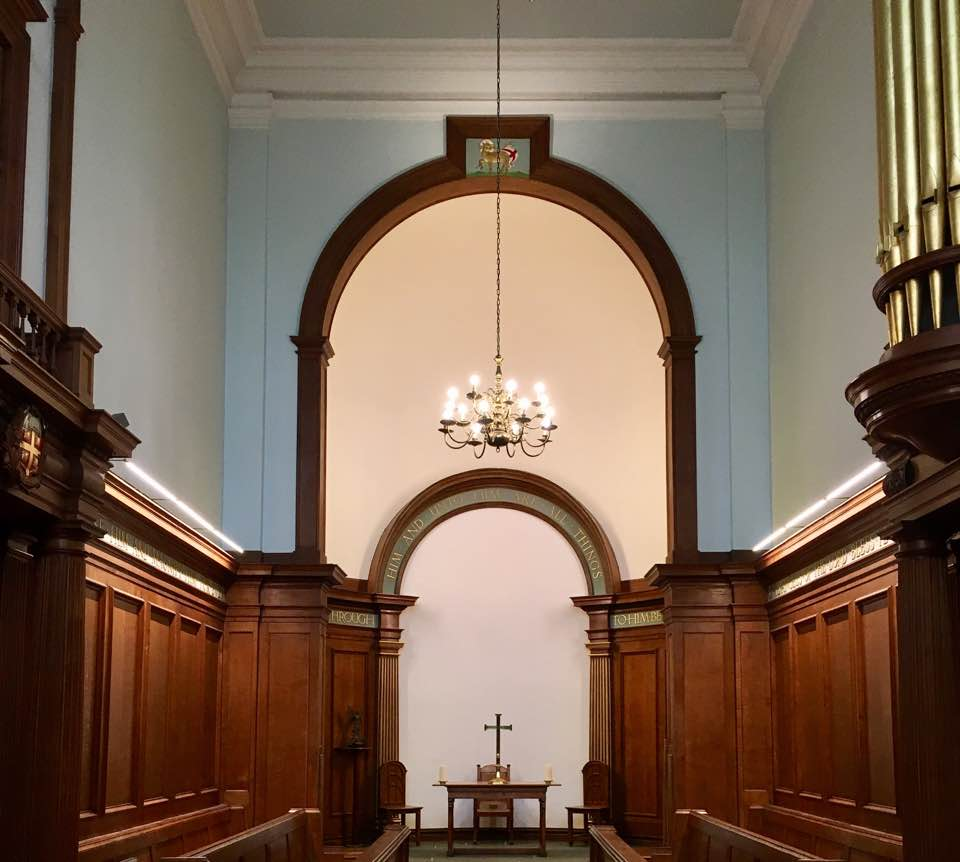
The chapel

The principal's house was completed in 1929, and the chapel, originally with paintings by Harold Speed, in 1930. The buildings were designed by Maurice Webb and the garden designed in 1925 by Sir Aston Webb in a Tudor revival style.

The chair of Systematics and Pastoral Theology was held by the first principal, Dr. Henry Maldwyn Hughes, from 1921 to 1937. He was the author of several works on Christian belief. That of New Testament Language and Literature was held by the Revd Robert Newton Flew from 1927 to 1937, when he succeeded Hughes both as principal and professor. One of the earliest students was Donald Soper. Flew, principal up to 1955, was one of the moving forces behind the establishment of the World Council of Churches. Another alumnus was Bolaji Idowu, who headed the Methodist Church Nigeria from 1972 to 1984.

The three-sided court fronted by iron gates and railings became enclosed in 1973 by a new building housing flats for married students and a lecture theatre. This building no longer belongs to the college.

== New buildings ==
On 1 September 2014 the Jesus Lane site was sold back to Jesus College and a long lease on the eastern part of the site taken out by the Trustees of Wesley House. The Principal's House and Chapel were retained, whilst a new gatehouse building containing a library, dining hall and teaching rooms were constructed in Jesus Lane, as was a block of student accommodation at the back of the site. The new buildings were opened in the 2016–2017 academic year in a ceremony featuring Prince Edward, an alumnus of next-door Jesus College.

== Operation ==
The College is administered by a board of trustees. There is room for some 28, mostly graduate students, and for guests. The present Principal is Rev. Dr Jane Leach, who has written on faith development and pastoral care. Students working for the degrees of BTh, BA, MPhil and PhD are attached to a secular Cambridge University college or to Anglia Ruskin University, alongside Wesley House. Wesley staff serve as associate lecturers of the university and deliver courses developed in-house.

Wesley House produces an academic journal, Holiness, featuring peer-reviewed items of interest to Methodist scholars. It works in partnership with several other Methodist institutions worldwide, including Seth Mokitimi Methodist Seminary in South Africa, Wesley Theological Seminary in Washington DC, Kenya Methodist University, and the Candler School of Theology in Atlanta, Georgia. The first issue appeared in 2015, with Janet Morley serving as the founding Commissioning Editor. Andrew Stobart became Commissioning Editor in 2016. The current Editor is Revd Dr Jason Radcliff SSC, having been appointed in December 2025.

== Notable staff ==
- Kenneth Cracknell
- Robert Newton Flew
- Martin Forward
- Jane Leach
- Ernest Gordon Rupp

=== List of principals ===
- 1921–1937: Henry Maldwyn Hughes
- 1937–1955: Robert Newton Flew
- 1955–1967: William Frederick Flemington
- 1967–1974: Ernest Gordon Rupp
- 1974-1980: Michael James Skinner
- 1980–1984: Brian Edgar Beck
- 2011 – present: Jane Leach

== Notable alumni ==
- John C. A. Barrett
- Kenneth Grayston
- Leslie Griffiths
- Bolaji Idowu
- Jane Leach
- David Pawson
- Kathleen Richardson, Baroness Richardson of Calow
- Ernest Gordon Rupp
- Donald Soper
- Gwilym Tilsley
- David Wilkinson

== See also ==
- Wesley Methodist Church, Cambridge
- Westcott House, Cambridge, a Church of England theological college, also in Jesus Lane
- Paul Stuart Glass: The History of Wesley House (Leeds: University of Leeds, 1993)
