= Kenneth Grayston =

English theologian (1914–2005)

Kenneth Grayston (8 July 1914 – 10 June 2005) was a British theologian. He is the author of Dying, We Live. A New Inquiry into the Death of Christ in the New Testament (1990).

Grayston was born in Sheffield, and was raised and educated in south London. He studied chemistry at St John's College, Oxford, then theology at Wesley House, Cambridge. He was ordained as a Methodist minister in 1942. In 1944, he was appointed assistant director of broadcasting at the BBC, moving from there to become a tutor in New Testament at Didsbury Theological College, then a lecturer at the University of Bristol. He held the post of professor of theology there from 1965 until 1979. He also served as dean of the Faculty of Arts from 1972 until 1974, and as the university's pro-vice chancellor from 1976 until 1979.

== Publications ==
- The Gospel of John (Epworth Commentaries) ISBN 0716204673
- The Johannine Epistles (New Century Bible Commentary)
- The Letters of Paul to the Philippians and to the Thessalonians
- The Epistle to the Romans (Epworth Commentaries) ISBN 978-0-7162-0511-1
- Dying, We Live 1990 Darton, Longman and Todd Ltd ISBN 978-0-232-51836-8
