= Richard Stone (sculptor) =

British sculptor

- Born: 1974 (age 51–52); Devon, United Kingdom
- Education: Central Saint Martins
- Elected: Royal British Society of Sculptors
- Website: richardstoneprojects.com

Richard Stone is a British sculptor with an MA from Central Saint Martins Central Saint Martins. He works between London and Pietrasanta, Italy. In 2023 he was commissioned to create eight bespoke sculptures for Raffles London at the Old War Office (OWO), Whitehall, for which he received the Brit List Award for Best in British Design. Stone was a fellow and trustee of the Royal British Society of Sculptors from 2017-2020 and appointed an honorary fellow in 2024. In 2014 Stone was awarded the Brian Mercer Residency for Bronze Casting and in 2013 was awarded Arts Council England funding.

== Notable exhibitions ==
Stone has been included in multiple group and solo exhibitions with representative galleries in the UK, US, Europe and China. He has also been included in group presentations at premium art fairs including Art Dubai, Untitled Miami, Art Paris and Art Brussels. In 2024, Stone was included in the fundraising exhibition ‘The 10gram Challenge’ for the Royal Society of Sculptors at Thomas Dane Gallery in London, other contributing sculptors included Antony Gormley, Grayson Perry and Cathie Pilkington RA. In 2026 Stone's sculpture was cited as the founding inspiration for the JOSEPH AW26 collection, shown at Tate Modern during London Fashion Week. Creative Director Mario Arena stated the collection was inspired by Stone's sculptural approach of "finding form where form does not exist." Also in 2026, Stone participated in Sculpture Above Ground, an inaugural exhibition at Kensington Roof Gardens, London, curated by Nick Hornby and Aurore Ankarcrona Hennessey for the Royal Society of Sculptors. In 2023 he was one of several artists to inaugurate Kristin Hjellegjerde’s gallery in West Palm Beach. He was included in the exhibition Nature Morte, which toured museums in Norway, Sweden and Poland before returning to London's Guildhall in 2017 and again to the USA in 2022.

== Critical responses ==
Stone was cited in the Financial Times as a 'rising star' and has been referred to as "one of the most talented artists working in the UK today" An in-depth feature was included in Trebuchet Magazine in 2021. Stone was also included in Michael Petry's Nature Morte which explored the timeless tradition of still life, bought up to date by international contemporary artists including Matt Collishaw, Elmgreen & Dragset, Gabriel Orozco and Gerhard Richter.

== Media recognition ==
Stone has been featured in many media articles including Artdependence, Elephant and Wall Street International Magazine. In 2018, a documentary entitled Hard Beauty screened on Sky Arts in the United Kingdom. The documentary featured Stone discussing his mentor Helaine Blumenfeld's sculptural practice. In 2017, Stone appeared on London Live, where he spoke about the exhibition Nature Morte. In 2026 Stone was featured in British Vogue in connection with the JOSEPH AW26 fashion collection. Stone has written regularly for including an essay on problematic public sculpture, in response to the Edward Colston statue controversy.

== Major Commissions ==
In 2023, Stone was commissioned by Raffles London to create eight bespoke sculptures for the corner suites of the Old War Office (OWO) development on Whitehall, London. The works, from his Horse Revisited series, were placed in suites overlooking Horse Guards Parade. The commission was curated by ARTIQ and received the Brit List Award for Best in British Design in 2023.
