= David Bennett Inquiry =

The David Bennett Inquiry was held in the UK to look into the death of David "Rocky" Bennett on 30 October 1998 in a medium secure psychiatric unit in Norwich, after being restrained by staff.

David Bennett was a 38-year-old African-Caribbean patient, who had had mental illness for 18 years, and had a diagnosis of schizophrenia. The inquiry concluded that there was institutional racism within the mental health services.

The inquiry into the death of David 'Rocky' Bennett recommended that training in cultural competencies should become of paramount importance (Department of Health, 2003).

The incident under mental health services (leading to his death) is widely known. After racial abuse from a different patient in the same room, a fight occurred and David Bennett alone was removed from the room. The resentment of being targeted for blame has been understandably linked to his physical attack on a nurse afterwards. His subsequent physical restrainment included giving a dose of medication that is above the recommended limit (in the British National Formulary), and this directly preceded his tragic death.

== See also ==
- Stephen Lawrence
