= Cambridge Theological Federation =

Theological association

The Cambridge Theological Federation (CTF) is an association of theological colleges, courses and houses based in Cambridge, England and founded in 1972. The federation offers several joint theological programmes of study open to students in member institutions; these programmes are either validated by or are taught on behalf either the University of Cambridge or Anglia Ruskin University. It also offers courses as part of the Common Award validated by Durham University.

== Programmes ==
CTF has the following undergraduate programs:

- BTh: Bachelor of Theology for Ministry (University of Cambridge)
- DTM: Diploma in Theology for Ministry (University of Cambridge)
- Certificate of Higher Education in Theology, Ministry and Mission (Common Award)
- Diploma of Higher Education in Theology, Ministry and Mission (Common Award)
- BA (Hons) in Theology, Ministry and Mission (Common Award)
- Graduate Diploma in Theology, Ministry and Mission (Common Award)

CTF has the following post-graduate programs:

- Postgraduate Certificate in Theology, Ministry and Mission (Common Award)
- Postgraduate Diploma in TMM (Common Award)
- MA in TMM (Common Award)
- MA in Contemporary Ethics, Contemporary Faith and Belief, Pastoral Care and Chaplaincy, or Spirituality (Anglia Ruskin University)
- Professional Doctorate in Practical Theology (Anglia Ruskin University)
- PhD or MPhil in Theology (University of Cambridge or Anglia Ruskin University or Garrett-Evangelical Theological Seminary - USA)

== Members ==
Member institutions are:

- Cambridge Centre for Christianity Worldwide (formerly the Henry Martyn Centre)
- Institute for Orthodox Christian Studies (Eastern Orthodox)
- Margaret Beaufort Institute of Theology (Roman Catholic)
- Ridley Hall (Church of England / Evangelical)
- Wesley House (Methodist)
- Westcott House (Church of England / Liberal Catholic)
- Westfield House (Evangelical Lutheran Church of England)
- Westminster College (United Reformed Church)

Associate members are:

- Eastern Region Ministry Course (Church of England)
- Faraday Institute for Science and Religion
- The Woolf Institute (which includes the Centre for the Study of Jewish-Christian relations)
- The Kirby Laing Centre for Public Theology in Cambridge

== See also ==
- Permanent private hall
