= Martin Forward =

British writer and scholar

Martin Forward is a British, Methodist Christian lecturer and author on religion and Professor of History at Aurora University, Illinois. He has taught Islam at the Universities of Leicester, Bristol and Cambridge, and had spent a period of time in India where he was ordained into the Church of South India. He was also a senior tutor and lecturer in Pastoral and Systematic Theology (Wesley House, Cambridge), and was a member of the Cambridge University Faculty of Divinity. Currently, he is the Executive Director of Aurora University's Wackerlin Center for Faith and Action and the Helena Wackerlin Professor of Religion, and has participated in numerous Interfaith dialogues. He has authored a number of books related to Islam and Christianity, such as "Muhammad: A Short Biography" and "Jesus: A Short Biography" respectively.

== Books ==
- Muhammad: A Short Biography (1998). Oxford: Oneworld. ISBN 1-85168-131-0.
- The Failure Of Islamic Modernism?: Syed Ameer Ali's Interpretation Of Islam (1999). Peter Lang Publishing. ISBN 3-906762-38-6.
