= Richard Stone (painter) =

British painter

- Born: Richard William Stone; 5 June 1951 (age 75); Witham, Essex
- Occupation: painter
- Website: richardstoneuk.com

Richard William Stone (born 5 June 1951) is a British painter, specialising in portraits. In 1973, at the age of 22, he claims he was the youngest commissioned royal portrait painter in almost 200 years. Stone claims to have secured the commission by cold-calling Clarence House and saying "I could be a latter-day Rembrandt". He has completed commissioned portraits of Queen Elizabeth II, Queen Elizabeth The Queen Mother, King Charles III, Princesses Margaret and Alice, Princes Philip, Andrew and Michael, Sophie, Duchess of Edinburgh, Birgitte, Duchess of Gloucester, and Princess Michael of Kent. He also painted the official Downing Street portrait of Margaret Thatcher, who upon inspecting his work, requested that he add her handbag to the portrait. His portraits hang at Buckingham Palace, the National Portrait Gallery (London), and the National Portrait Gallery (Australia).

Stone's 1992 portrait of Queen Elizabeth II was used by the BBC during the announcement of her death and in the subsequent obituary broadcasts.
