= List of masters of Selwyn College, Cambridge =

The master of Selwyn College, Cambridge, is the official head of the college and a deputy vice-chancellor of the University of Cambridge. The master of the college is elected by the fellows of Selwyn College, Cambridge, and oversees the direction, development, and promotion of the college. The master of the college is typically selected for significant academic, journalistic, political, or cultural contributions. A master selected by the fellowship uses the title master-elect until installed in the new position, typically at the beginning of the academic year. The current master of the college is former civil servant Suzanne Raine.

== History ==
The college has elected thirteen masters since its founding in 1882. The first master of the college, Arthur Lyttelton (1882–1893), was instrumental in coordinating the establishment of the college and the development of its first court. The second master of the college, John Richardson Selwyn (1893–1898), was a son of the college's namesake, George Augustus Selwyn. Particularly significant or influential masters have been commemorated through the naming of buildings and rooms throughout the college, such as the Owen Chadwick Room. Other masters such as Richard Appleton (1907–1909) have had their initials engraved on the exterior stones of the college's Dining Hall. The master is provided use of the Master Lodge in Old Court for the duration of their term. The Master's Lodge has traditionally served both as the residence of the master as well as a place for college meetings, receptions, and events. Subsequent masters of the college, including Richard Bowring (2000–2013) and Roger Mosey, have continued to lead the college's expansion through the development of new academic and residential buildings.

== Masters ==
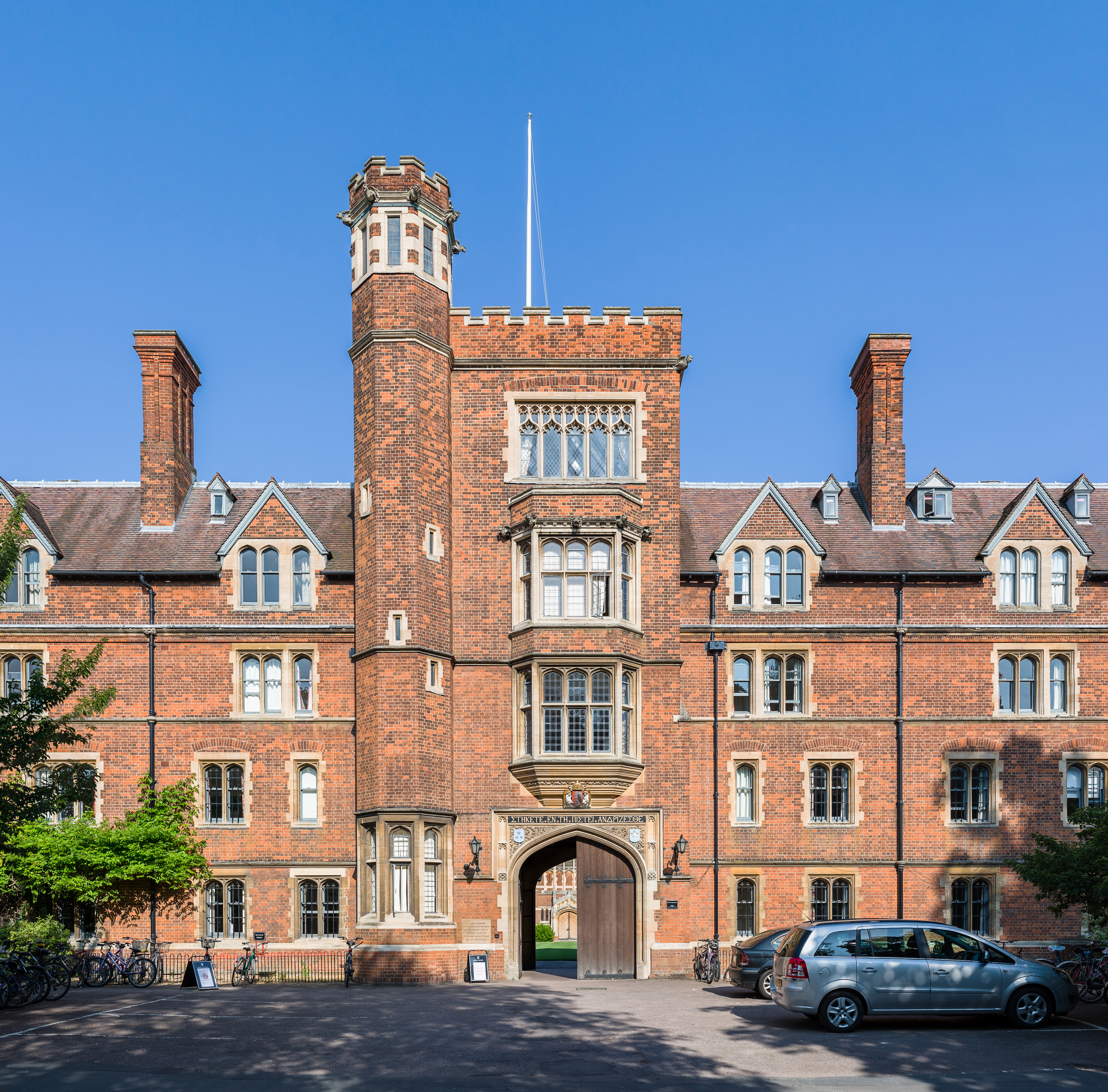
Selwyn College, Cambridge

Masters of Selwyn College, Cambridge

- 1882–1893 Arthur Lyttelton
- 1893–1898 John Richardson Selwyn
- 1898–1907 A. F. Kirkpatrick
- 1907–1909 Richard Appleton (academic)
- 1909–1928 John Murray
- 1928–1934 George Ernest Newsom
- 1934–1946 George Armitage Chase
- 1947–1956 William Telfer
- 1956–1983 Owen Chadwick
- 1983–1993 Sir Alan Cook
- 1994–2000 Sir David Harrison
- 2000–2013 Richard Bowring
- 2013–2025 Roger Mosey
- 2025– Suzanne Raine

== See also ==
- Selwyn College Library
- University of Cambridge
- Selwyn College, Cambridge
