= Richard Appleton (academic) =

English clergyman and scholar (1849–1909)

The Reverend Richard Appleton
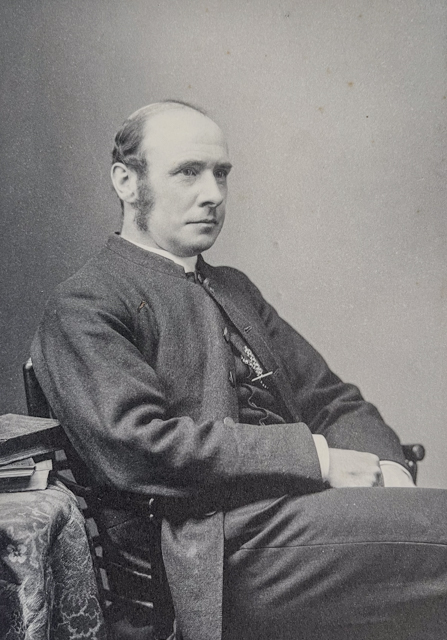
- Church: Church of England

Orders
- Ordination: 1878

Personal details
- Born: Richard Appleton; 17 February 1849 Liverpool
- Died: 1 March 1909 (aged 60) Cambridge
- Buried: Ascension Parish Burial Ground, Cambridge
- Parents: Revd Richard Appleton
- Occupation: Master of Selwyn College, Cambridge, 1907 – 1909
- Education: Christ's Hospital; Trinity College, Cambridge

Richard Appleton MA (17 February 1849 – 1 March 1909) was an English scholar, clergyman of the Church of England, and the fourth Master of Selwyn College, Cambridge, 1907 – 1909. He was a fellow of Trinity College, Cambridge, and a parish priest before moving to Selwyn.

== Early life ==
Appleton was born in Liverpool, the son of another Revd Richard Appleton and grandson, on his mother's side, of Canon John Patrick Eden, Rector of Sedgefield, Durham. Appleton was from a background that was rare in producing Cambridge undergraduates in Victorian times; his father was not well off, a clergyman with a large family, and scholarships got him through Christ's Hospital and Trinity College. At Trinity, he was Sixth Wrangler and won the Chancellor's Medal. He was awarded a second class degree in the Classical tripos.

== Career ==
He was elected a Fellow of Trinity College when he graduated, but he did not undertake major research work. Instead, he was a lecturer in mathematics, Theology and Hebrew in the days before teaching was expected to be specialised. He was Dean of Trinity College, 1884–91 and Tutor, 1885–94.

He was ordained a priest in 1878 and Appleton went to become warden of Trinity College Mission and vicar of St George's Church, Camberwell, 1894–1903. He was then vicar of St Mary's Church, Ware, Hertfordshire and Rural Dean, 1904–7.

Appleton had limited previous connection with Selwyn College when he was chosen as its Master, but he became an influential master of the college through various construction projects he oversaw. The college had been founded around 1880 to counter some of the effects of the "Revolution of the Dons" that occurred in the 1860s. The university was opened up to people of any religion and none, so the college was to be a haven for Anglicans. Every Master of Selwyn College was a clergyman up until 1983. As a clergyman and Master of Selwyn, Appleton was something of a throwback to the old pattern of Cambridge academic life prior to the "Revolution of the Dons".

== Legacy ==
After serving as Master for just two years, he died at the College from influenza in 1909. His body is buried in the Ascension Parish Burial Ground, Cambridge. A memorial brass is in the ante-chapel of Trinity College Chapel, Cambridge.

Appleton left a permanent memorial of his mastership in having raised the funds to build the southern range of buildings in the Old Court, including the College Hall, and Combination room. His initials and rebus of an apple and a tun, are carved on the front of the Hall stairway.

== Bibliography ==
- APPLETON, Rev. Richard, Who Was Who, A & C Black, an imprint of Bloomsbury Publishing plc, 1920–2008; online edn, Oxford University Press, Dec 2007 accessed 6 March 2013

Academic offices
Preceded by Alexander Kirkpatrick	Master of Selwyn College, Cambridge; 1907-9	Succeeded by John Owen Farquhar Murray
