= George Chase (bishop) =

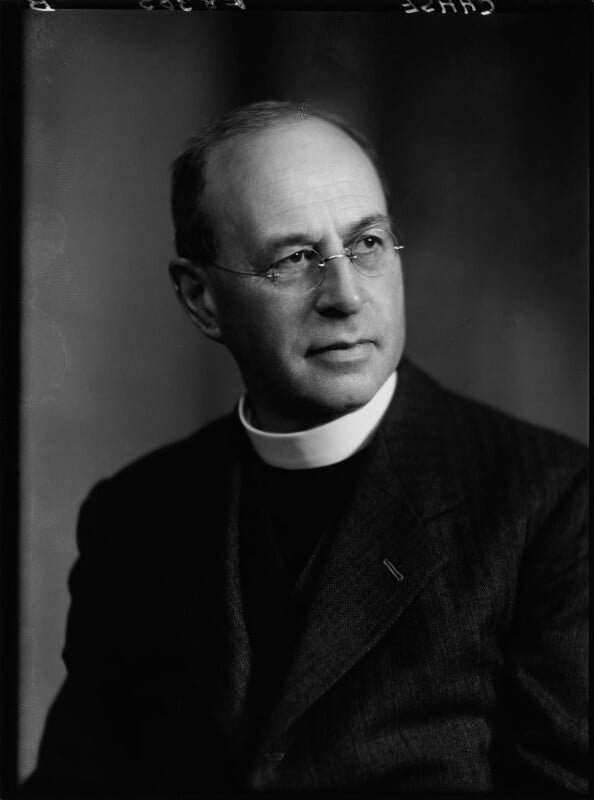
Chase in 1946

George Armitage Chase MC (3 September 1886 – 30 November 1971) was Bishop of Ripon and Master of Selwyn College, Cambridge.

== Early life ==
His father, Frederic Chase, had been President of Queens' College, Cambridge, and Norris–Hulse Professor of Divinity before his elevation to the Bishopric of Ely in 1905. Like his father, he would spend much of his working life in Cambridge. He was educated at Rugby School and Queens' College, Cambridge.

== Ordained ministry ==
=== Early posts ===
Chase served for two years as a curate at Portsea, regarded as a model Church of England parish. In 1913, he was appointed fellow and dean of Trinity Hall. In February, 1915, he was interviewed for a commission in the Army Chaplaincy, and was posted first to Eastern Command and, subsequently, to France and to Italy. He won a Military Cross at Ypres in October, 1917, 'For conspicuous gallantry and devotion to duty in repeatedly exposing himself to heavy shell fire in order to bring in the wounded. His example and cheerfulness had a most steadying effect on the men.' He was one of 28 diocesan bishops in England in the 1940s and 1950s who had been awarded bravery medals in the Great War. There are two short observations on Chase's work as a padre. 'Excellent chaplain' was recorded in the summer of 1916 and, in November, 1918, the Deputy Chaplain-General noted, 'Excellent Brigade chaplain. Did very good work in Italy', Chase was demobilised in December, 1919, and returned to Trinity Hall.

=== Senior posts ===
In 1934, he was appointed Master of Selwyn College, Cambridge, and, although 59 years of age, in 1946 he was nominated as Bishop of Ripon. He had been considered for a see in England for the previous 11 years He had actually been offered the bishopric of Sheffield in 1939 but had declined it on the advice of Cyril Garbett, his former vicar at Portsea, who had been appointed Bishop of Winchester in 1932 and, in 1942, would become Archbishop of York. Garbett had felt that Chase, with his Cambridge academic background, was unsuited to a large urban see. In 1941, Chase had been a leading candidate for the vacancy at Ely, of special interest to him for his father had held that post a generation earlier. The vacancy, however, went to Edward Wynn, another Cambridge don. When further vacancies arose, Chase received favourable consideration, but it was not until Ripon appeared in 1946 that an offer was made to him. By then, Garbett was Archbishop of York, and Ripon was in the province of York, and Clement Attlee had succeeded Winston Churchill as prime minister. Prime ministers were key figures in the appointment process. Garbett made Chase his first choice for Ripon but was unenthusiastic. "To put it quite frankly, this would not be in any way an exciting appointment, but it would be perfectly safe and sound." Attlee had undertaken his own investigation at Cambridge and had been told that Chase was "Beta plus, plus, plus, with a shade of alpha." Chase, nevertheless, was appointed to Ripon.

Whatever Chase's apparent shortcomings, he made a success of his tenure of office at Ripon. He was considered for more senior posts at Durham in 1952 and 1956; and as the successor to Garbett at York in 1955. Archbishop Fisher of Canterbury regarded Chase as a very strong candidate for York but, against Fisher's wishes, Michael Ramsey was appointed.

== Retirement ==
At the age of 72, Chase announced his retirement from Ripon. Owen Chadwick's biography of Archbishop Ramsey includes a tribute to Chase, as someone "mature in years and experience, a scholar, solid, stable, absolutely reliable, shy and at times remote ..." and "Good as gold and wise as Solomon." Chase returned to Cambridge on his retirement, reintegrated into university life, became an assistant to his friend, Noel Hudson, who had previously been Bishop of Newcastle, and died in Cambridge in 1971 aged 85.

== Publications ==
- A Companion to the Revised Psalter, S.P.C.K (1963) ISBN B0006EW7BK
- Introduction to the Psalms, S.P.C.K (1964) ISBN 978-1-4372-6570-5

Religious titles
Preceded by Geoffrey Lunt	Bishop of Ripon; 1946–1959	Succeeded by John Moorman
Academic offices
Preceded by George Ernest Newsom	Master of Selwyn College, Cambridge; 1934–1946	Succeeded by William Telfer
