= Libraries of the University of Cambridge =

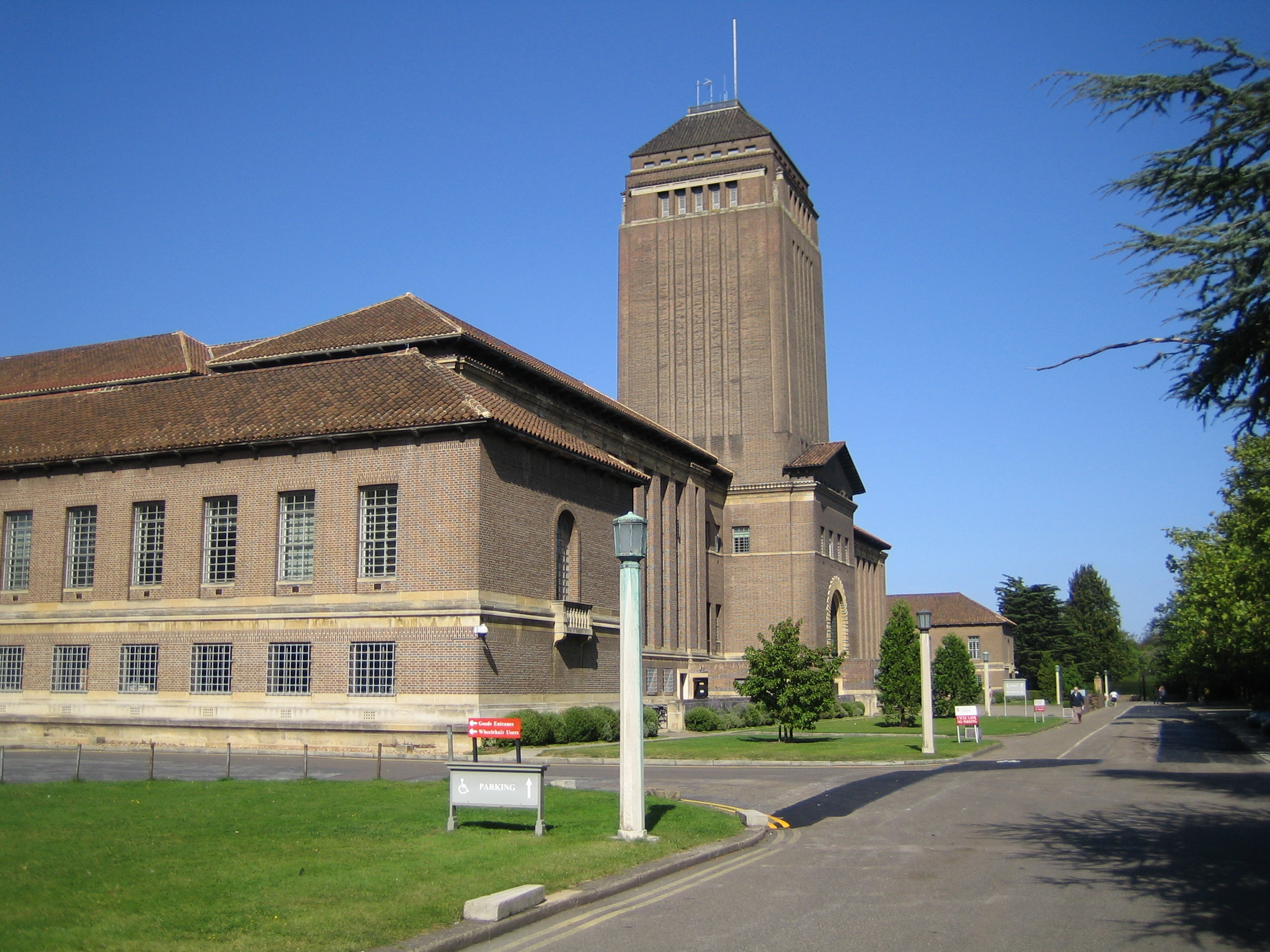
Cambridge University Library, the largest of over 100 University of Cambridge libraries

There are over 100 libraries within the University of Cambridge. These include Cambridge University Library, the main university library, affiliated libraries, departmental and faculty libraries, college libraries, and various other specialist libraries associated with the university. Across all libraries, the university houses approximately 16 million books.

== University Library ==
Cambridge University Library, referred to within the university as "the University Library" or just "the UL", is the central research library. It holds around 8 million items (including maps and sheet music) and, in contrast with the Bodleian or the British Library, many of its books are available on open shelves. It is one of the six legal deposit libraries in the United Kingdom, and is therefore entitled to request a free copy of every book published in the UK and Ireland. Through legal deposit, purchases and donations it receives around 100,000 books every year.

== Affiliated faculty/departmental libraries ==
There are sixty three faculty and departmental libraries associated with the main University Library, for the purpose of central governance and administration. This group is a growing network, with a remit to "maximise efficiency while catering to the diverse range of user needs."

African Studies	Asian & Middle Eastern Studies	Art and Architecture
Criminology Library	Education	English
Haddon Library	Marshall Library of Economics	Medical Library
Mill Lane Library	Moore Library	Pendlebury Library of Music
Casimir Lewy Library (Philosophy)	Seeley Historical Library	South Asian Studies
Squire Law Library	Whipple Library	Classics
Divinity	Modern & Medieval Languages Library	

== Departmental and faculty libraries ==
Anglo-Saxon, Norse and Celtic Library	Applied Mathematics and Theoretical Physics Library	Astronomy Library
Balfour and Newton Libraries (Department of Zoology)	Bullard Laboratories Library (Department of Earth Sciences)	Cambridge University Collection of Aerial Photography
Careers Service Library	Chemical Engineering	Chemistry Library
Colman Library (Biochemistry)	Computer Science and Technology Department Library	Cory Library (Botanic Gardens)
Department of Psychology Library	Earth Sciences Library	Engineering Library
Experimental Psychology	Fitzwilliam Museum	Department of Coins and Medals (Fitzwilliam Museum)
Department of Manuscripts and Printed Books (Fitzwilliam Museum)	Genetics Library	Geography Library
Hamilton Kerr Institute	Herbarium Library (Plant Sciences)	History and Philosophy of Science
History of Population and Social Structure	Institute of Continuing Education	Interdisciplinary Research Centre in Superconductivity
Isaac Newton Institute for Mathematical Sciences	John Trim Centre (Language Centre)	Judge Business School Information Centre
Kanthack and Nuttall Library (Department of Pathology)	Latin American Studies Centre	Lauterpacht Centre for International Law - Old Library
Lauterpacht Centre for International Law - Finley Library	Materials Science Library	Physiology Development and Neuroscience Library
Pure Mathematics and Mathematical Statistics Library	Rayleigh Library (Physics)	Scott Polar Research Institute Library
Social Anthropology Library	UCLES Library (Cambridge Assessment)	Veterinary Anatomy Library
Veterinary Medicine		

== College libraries ==
There is at least one library in every college within the university. All colleges have a working library, generally to support undergraduate teaching. Material in the college libraries will typically cover all Tripos subjects. Many of the colleges also have special collections such as early printed books and manuscripts, and are often kept in a separate library. For example, Trinity College's Wren Library holds more than 200,000 books printed before 1800, while the Parker Library at Corpus Christi College, has one of the greatest early medieval European manuscript collections in the world, with over 600 manuscripts.

Christ's College (Old Library) (Working Library)	Churchill College Library (Churchill Archives Centre)	Clare College (Forbes Mellon Library)
Clare Hall (Ashby Library)	Corpus Christi College Parker Library (Taylor Library)	Darwin College Library
Downing College (Maitland Robinson Library)	Emmanuel College Library	Fitzwilliam College (Olisa Library)
Girton College Library	Gonville and Caius College Library (Upper Library) (Lower Library)	Homerton College Library
Hughes Hall Library	Jesus College Quincentenary Library (Old Library)	King's College Library
Lucy Cavendish College Library	Magdalene College Library (Pepys Library)	Murray Edwards College (Rosemary Murray Library)
Newnham College Library	Pembroke College Library	Peterhouse (Perne Library) (Ward Library)
Queens' College (Old Library) (War Memorial Library)	Robinson College Library	Selwyn College Library (Bartlam Library)
Sidney Sussex College (Richard Powell Library)	St Catharine's College (Shakeshaft Library) (Sherlock Library)	St Edmund's College Library
St John's College Old Library (Working Library)	Trinity College Library (Wren Library)	Trinity Hall Old Library (Jerwood Library)
Wolfson College (Lee Seng Tee Library/Lee Library)		

== Other libraries associated with the university ==
Ancient India and Iran Trust	Blackfriars	British Antarctic Survey
Cambridge Arctic Shelf Programme	Cambridge Centre for Christianity Worldwide	Cambridge Theological Federation
Centre for Jewish-Christian Relations	Henry Martyn Centre	Institute for Orthodox Christian Studies
Institute of Biotechnology	MRC Human Nutrition Research	Margaret Beaufort Institute of Theology
Molecular Biology	Needham Research Institute (East Asian History of Science Library)	Ridley Hall
Strangeways Research Laboratory	Tyndale House	Union Society Library
Wesley House	Westcott House	Westfield House
Westminster College	West Hub Library	Woolf Institute

== See also ==
- Books in the United Kingdom
- List of libraries in the United Kingdom
