= Alan Cook (physicist) =

English physicist (1922–2004)

Sir Alan Hugh Cook FRS (2 December 1922 – 23 July 2004) was an English physicist who specialised in geophysics and metrology. He worked at the University of Cambridge, National Physical Laboratory, and the University of Edinburgh. From 1977-79 Cook was President of the Royal Astronomical Society.

== Early life and education ==
Cook was born in Felsted, Essex in 1922. He was the eldest of the six children of Reginald Thomas Cook, a customs and excise officer, and his wife, Ethel, née Saxon. His family were active in the Congregational church; Cook became a lifelong Christian.

He was initially educated at the village school at Felsted, then at West Leigh School in Leigh-on-Sea. From 1933 he attended at Westcliff High School for Boys, a grammar school in Westcliff-on-Sea. In 1939 he won a scholarship to attend university at Corpus Christi College, Cambridge, beginning in 1940. As an undergraduate, he studied the natural sciences tripos, selecting courses in physical sciences, biological sciences, the history and philosophy of science and geology. He received his Bachelor of Arts degree in 1943.

Cook graduated during World War Two, so was conscripted into military service. He was assigned to the Admiralty Signals Establishment (now part of the Admiralty Research Establishment) as a temporary experimental officer, in the field of electronic counter-measures. After the war he returned to Cambridge to study for a doctor of philosophy (PhD) degree under the supervision of Edward Bullard and B. C. Browne. His PhD thesis was on precise measurements of gravity in the British Isles.

== Academic and scientific career ==
Cook developed research interests in precision measurement across the physical sciences. He performed post-doctoral research at Cambridge in geodesy and geophysics.

When Bullard moved to the National Physical Laboratory (NPL) at Teddington, Cook moved with him, joining the meteorological department of NPL. Cook performed experiments including: determining the precise density of mercury, required for atmospheric pressure measurements (see mmHg); measuring the absolute acceleration of falling bodies (gravimetry); and determining the Earth's gravitational potential, by using the precisely known orbits of the Sputnik satellites (satellite geodesy). He also contributed to precision measurements of time and length standards, particularly using hyperfine lines in the spectrum of cadmium and interference spectroscopy, laser interferometry and masers. In 1966 he became superintendent of NPL's quantum metrology division.

In 1969, he was appointed professor of geophysics at Edinburgh University, where he founded the geophysics department. Three years later, he became Jacksonian Professor of Natural Philosophy at the Cavendish Laboratory, University of Cambridge, where he set up the laboratory astrophysics group. There he performed experiments in microwave spectroscopy and tests of Newton's law of gravitation at short distances. In 1979 he became head of the Cavendish Laboratory, and from 1983 to 1993 was master of the university's Selwyn College. His PhD students included the future astronaut Michael Foale.

After retiring in 1990, he took a strong interest in the history of science. From 1996, he was the editor of Notes and Records of the Royal Society of London, a history of science academic journal.

== Personal life ==
On 30 January 1948 he married Isabell Weir Adamson. The couple had a son and a daughter. He died from cancer on 23 July 2004 at Arthur Rank House, Cambridge.

== Honours and awards ==
- 1969: Fellow of the Royal Society.
- 1977-79: President of the Royal Astronomical Society.
- 1988: Knighthood
- 1993: The Chree Medal and Prize

== Publications ==
- Gravity and the earth (1969)
- Celestial Masers (1977)
- Gravitational experiments in the laboratory (1993)
- The observational foundations of physics (1994)
- Edmond Halley: charting the heavens and the seas (1998)

Academic offices
Preceded by John Cockcroft	Jacksonian Professor of Natural Philosophy; 1972–1990	Succeeded by Malcolm Longair
Preceded by Owen Chadwick	Master of Selwyn College, Cambridge; 1983–1993	Succeeded by David Harrison
