= Edward C. Ratcliff =

English Anglican priest and liturgical scholar

The Reverend Edward C. Ratcliff
- Born: Edward Craddock Ratcliff; 16 December 1896; Streatham, England
- Died: 30 July 1967 (aged 70)

Ecclesiastical career
- Religion: Christianity (Anglican)
- Church: Church of England
- Ordained: c. 1922

Academic background
- Education: St John's College, Cambridge

Academic work
- Discipline: Theology
- Sub-discipline: Liturgics
- Institutions: Westcott House; Queen's College, Oxford; King's College, London; St John's College, Cambridge

Edward Craddock Ratcliff (16 December 1896 – 30 July 1967) was an English Anglican priest and liturgical scholar. He was Professor of Liturgical Theology at King's College, London (1945–1947), and Ely Professor of Divinity (1947–1958) and Regius Professor of Divinity (1958–1964) at the University of Cambridge.

== Works ==
- The English Coronation Service (1936)
- The Book of Common Prayer: Its Making and Revisions (1949)
- The Coronation Service of Queen Elizabeth II (1953)
- From Uniformity to Unity (1962)

== See also ==
- Book of Common Prayer
- Christian liturgy

Academic offices
Preceded by William Telfer	Ely Professor of Divinity; 1947 – c. 1958	Succeeded by Stanley Lawrence Greenslade
Preceded by John Burnaby	Regius Professor of Divinity at the University of Cambridge; 1958–1964	Succeeded by Dennis Nineham
