= Alexander Kirkpatrick =

English Professor of Hebrew and Divinity

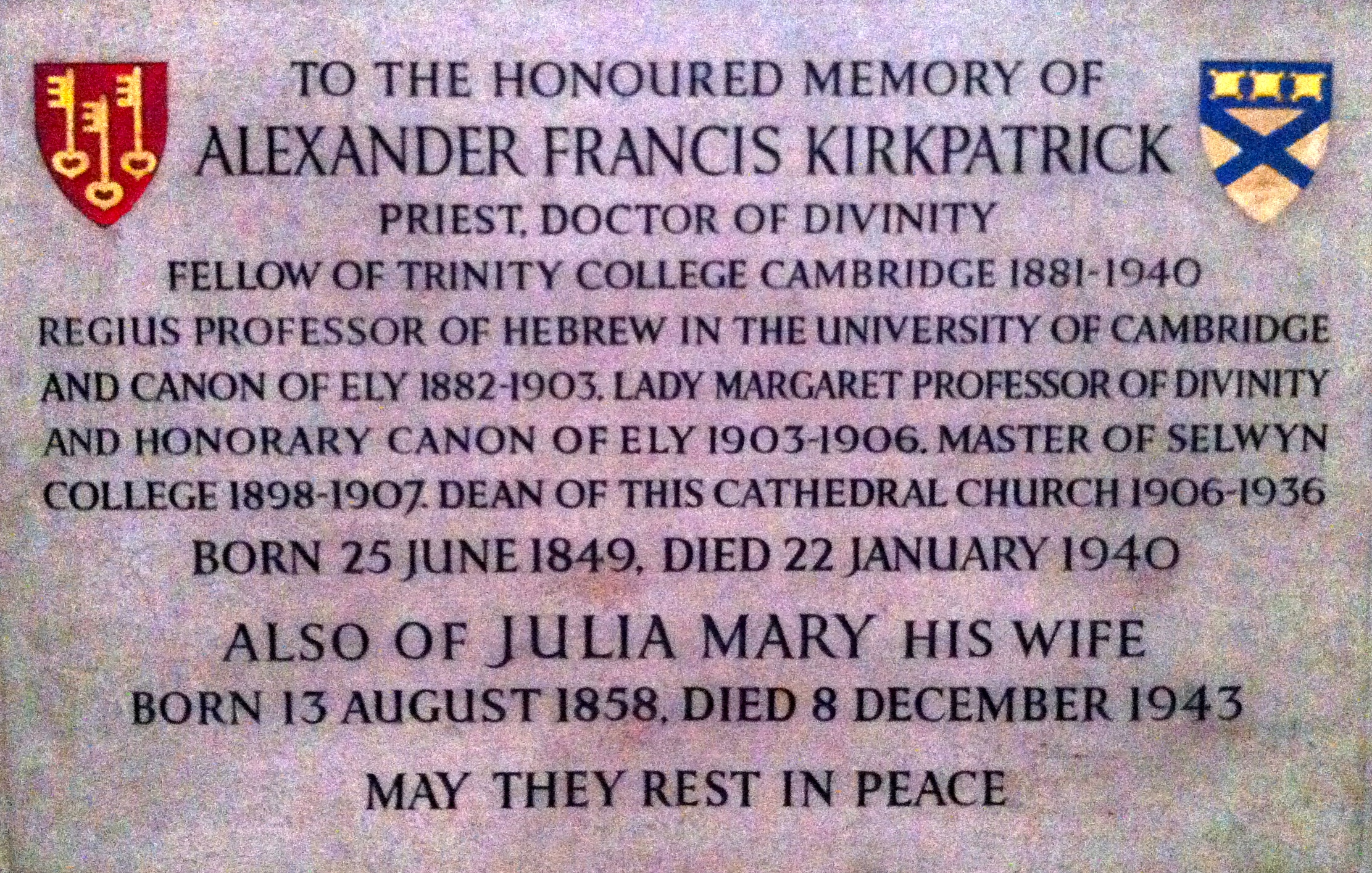
Memorial to Alexander Francis Kirkpatrick in Ely Cathedral

Alexander Francis Kirkpatrick (25 June 1849 – 22 January 1940) was Regius Professor of Hebrew at the University of Cambridge (1882–1903) and the third Master of Selwyn College, Cambridge (1898–1907).

== Life ==
Kirkpatrick was born at Lewes, East Sussex, only son (with three daughters) of Rev. Francis Kirkpatrick, and was educated at Haileybury and Trinity College, Cambridge.

He also served as Canon of Ely (1882–1903), Dean of Ely (1906 -1936), Examining Chaplain to the Bishop of Winchester (1895–1903) and General Editor for Old Testament and Apocrypha of the Cambridge Bible for Schools and Colleges (1892–1929), to which he contributed the commentaries on 1 and 2 Samuel and the Psalms. In his introduction to the book of Psalms, he observed that "they repeat the whispers of the Spirit of God, they reflect the very light of the Eternal Wisdom".

In 1884, Kirkpatrick married Julia Mary (1858–1943), daughter of Rev. J. Pemberton Bartlett, rector of Exbury, Hampshire. They had five sons and a daughter.

Church of England titles
Preceded by Charles Stubbs	Dean of Ely; 1906–1936	Succeeded by Lionel Blackburne
Academic offices
Preceded by Thomas Jarrett	Regius Professor of Hebrew, Cambridge University; 1882–1903	Succeeded by R. H. Kennett
Preceded by John Selwyn	Master of Selwyn College, Cambridge; 1898–1907	Succeeded by Richard Appleton
Preceded by Arthur James Mason	Lady Margaret's Professor of Divinity; 1903–1907	Succeeded by William Inge
