= Ely Professor of Divinity =

Professorship at the University of Cambridge

The Ely Professorship of Divinity was one of the professorships in divinity at the University of Cambridge. Originally part of the Regius Professorship of Greek, it was detached in 1889 and funded by the canonry of Ely, but has since been suppressed. The professors holding this chair were thus made residentiary canons of Ely Cathedral.

== Ely Professors ==
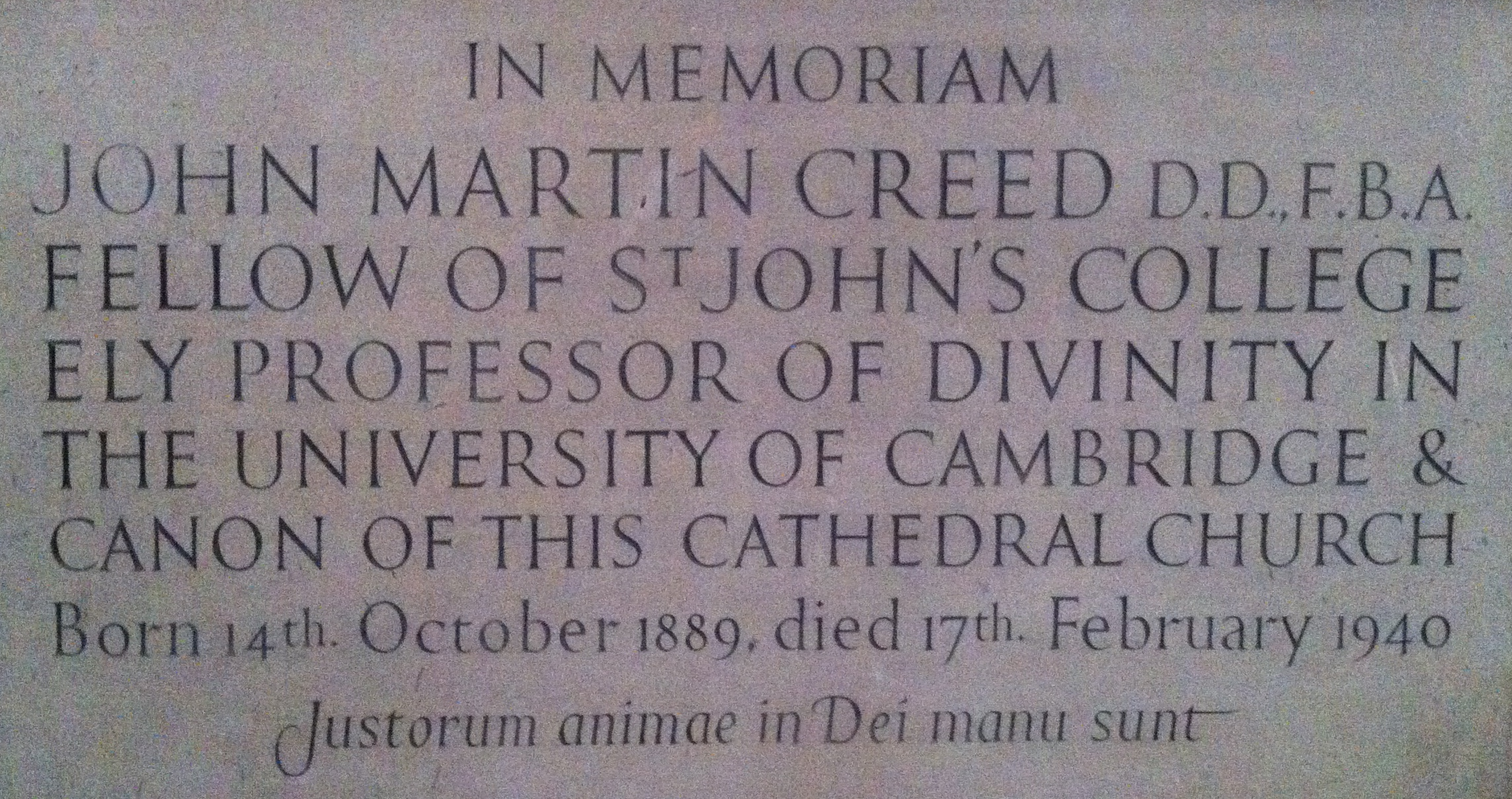
Memorial to John Martin Creed in Ely Cathedral

- Vincent Henry Stanton (1889)
- Alan England Brooke (1916)
- John Martin Creed (1926)
- John Sandwith Boys Smith (1940)
- William Telfer (1944)
- Edward Craddock Ratcliffe (1947)
- Stanley Lawrence Greenslade (1958)
- G.W.H. Lampe (1960)
- Christopher Stead (1971)
