= Spherical model =

The spherical model is a model of ferromagnetism similar to the Ising model, which was solved in 1952 by T. H. Berlin and M. Kac. It has the remarkable property that for linear dimension d greater than four, the critical exponents that govern the behaviour of the system near the critical point are independent of d and the geometry of the system. It is one of the few models of ferromagnetism that can be solved exactly in the presence of an external field.

== Formulation ==
The model describes a set of particles on a lattice $\mathbb{L}$ containing N sites. Each site j of $\mathbb{L}$ contains a spin $\sigma_j$ which interacts only with its nearest neighbours and an external field H. It differs from the Ising model in that the $\sigma_j$ are no longer restricted to $\sigma_j \in \{1,-1\}$, but can take all real values, subject to the constraint that

$$\sum_{j=1}^N \sigma_j^2 = N$$

which in a homogeneous system ensures that the average of the square of any spin is one, as in the usual Ising model.

The partition function generalizes from that of the Ising model to

$$Z_N = \int_{-\infty}^{\infty} \cdots \int_{-\infty}^\infty d\sigma_1 \cdots d\sigma_N \exp \left[ K \sum_{\langle jl \rangle} \sigma_j \sigma_l + h \sum_j \sigma_j \right] \delta \left[N - \sum_j \sigma_j^2 \right]$$

where $\delta$ is the Dirac delta function, $\langle jl \rangle$ are the edges of the lattice, and $K=J/kT$ and $h= H/kT$, where T is the temperature of the system, k is the Boltzmann constant and J the coupling constant of the nearest-neighbour interactions.

Berlin and Kac saw this as an approximation to the usual Ising model, arguing that the $\sigma$-summation in the Ising model can be viewed as a sum over all corners of an N-dimensional hypercube in $\sigma$-space. The becomes an integration over the surface of a hypersphere passing through all such corners.

It was rigorously proved by Kac and C. J. Thompson that the spherical model is a limiting case of the N-vector model.

== Equation of state ==
Solving the partition function and using a calculation of the free energy yields an equation describing the magnetization M of the system

$$2J(1-M^2) = kTg'(H/2JM)$$

for the function g defined as

$$g(z) = (2 \pi)^{-d} \int_0^{2\pi} \ldots \int_0^{2\pi} d\omega_1 \cdots d\omega_d \ln [z+d -\cos \omega_1 - \cdots - \cos \omega_d]$$

The internal energy per site is given by

$$u =\frac{1}{2} kT - Jd - \frac{1}{2}H(M+M^{-1})$$

an exact relation relating internal energy and magnetization.

== Critical behaviour ==
For $d \leq 2$ the critical temperature occurs at absolute zero, resulting in no phase transition for the spherical model. For d greater than 2, the spherical model exhibits the typical ferromagnetic behaviour, with a finite Curie temperature where ferromagnetism ceases. The critical behaviour of the spherical model was derived in the completely general circumstances that the dimension d may be a real non-integer dimension.

The critical exponents $\alpha, \beta, \gamma$ and $\gamma'$ in the zero-field case which dictate the behaviour of the system close to were derived to be

$$\alpha = \begin{cases}
- \frac{4-d}{d-2} & \text{if} \ 2<d<4 \\
0 & \text{if } d > 4 \end{cases}$$
$$\beta = \frac{1}{2}$$
$$\gamma = \begin{cases}
\frac{2}{d-2} & \text{if } 2 <d<4  \\
1 & \text{if } d > 4  \end{cases}$$
$$\delta = \begin{cases} \frac{d+2}{d-2} & \text{if } 2 < d < 4 \\
3 & \text{if } d > 4 \end{cases}$$

which are independent of the dimension of d when it is greater than four, the dimension being able to take any real value.
