= Suzanne Raine =

Master of Selwyn College Cambridge

Suzanne Raine MBE
- Born: Suzanne Elizabeth Nicholas; August 1970 (age 56); Germany
- Education: Peterhouse, Cambridge University (BA in History) (MA in History)
- Occupations: Master of Selwyn College, Cambridge
- Predecessor: Roger Mosey
- Spouse: John Raine

Suzanne Elizabeth Raine MBE (born 1970) is an academic who was elected Master of Selwyn College, Cambridge on October 1st 2025, succeeding the previous Master Roger Mosey. She was previously a civil servant at the British Foreign and Commonwealth Office, specialising in foreign policy, national security, and terrorism. Raine also works as an affiliated lecturer at the Cambridge Centre for Geopolitics and a visiting professor at King's College London, as well as serving as Deputy Chair of the Board of Trustees of the Imperial War Museums and Trustee of the Royal United Services Institute and International Bomber Command Centre.

== Early life and education ==
Raine was born in August 1970 in Germany.

Raine read History at Peterhouse College, of the University of Cambridge, specialising in German history. She graduated with a Bachelor of Arts in 1991, achieving a Double First, and later achieved a Master of Arts in History from the University of Cambridge. Raine also studied at Cambridge between 1992-1995 for a PhD but did not submit it due to joining the British Foreign Office.

Whilst working overseas as a civil servant in the British Foreign Office, Raine became a student at the National University of Modern Languages in Islamabad, and the University of Nizwa in Oman.

== Career ==
Raine joined the British Foreign and Commonwealth Office in 1995 and worked both at home and overseas until 2019 as a civil servant for the department, focusing on foreign policy and national security. Overseas, Raine took up posts in countries such as Poland, Iraq (2003) and Pakistan (2006-9). During her posting in Pakistan, Raine ran a research project for the British High Commission in Islamabad, presenting her findings to both the Foreign Office and Home Office. Prior to her posting in Pakistan, Raine spent time working in Jerusalem as Associate Producer of Israel and the Arabs - Elusive Peace (2005), a 3-part BBC TV series documenting the events of the Arab-Israeli peace process between 1998-2005.

Domestically, Raine led teams responsible for delivering national security objectives (2009-2012), including in preparation for the 2012 London Olympic Games. Raine held a number of senior appointments including Head of Counter Terrorism policy, Head of the Joint Terrorism Analysis Centre (2015-2017), and Director of Counter-Terrorism (2017-19). She was also a senior member of the UK government's assessment community.

Since leaving the Foreign Office in 2019, Raine has taken up a number of positions in academia, charities, and think tanks. She is a visiting professor in the Department of War Studies at King's College London and affiliate lecturer and lead on Political/Policy Placement at the Cambridge Centre for Geopolitics.

Raine serves as Deputy Chair of the Board of Trustees of the Imperial War Museum, having originally been appointed Trustee by Foreign Secretary Boris Johnson (1 January 2018), as well as Trustee of the Royal United Services Institute, and Trustee of the International Bomber Command Centre (2023-). She was previously a trustee of Stop the Traffik (2020-2023).

Raine was elected Master of Selwyn College, Cambridge on October 1st 2025, replacing the previous master Roger Mosey, and becoming the first female Master in the history of the college. Her installation ceremony took place in the Selwyn College Chapel on October 2nd 2025 and was presided over by then Bishop of London Dame Sarah Mullally.

== Personal life ==
Raine is married to senior British diplomat and intelligence advisor John Raine OBE.
