= Richard Bowring =

British Japanologist

Professor Richard Bowring
- Born: Richard Bowring; 6 February 1947 (age 79); England
- Education: University of Cambridge
- Known for: History, Politics, Asian Studies
- Scientific career
- Workplaces: University of Cambridge; Selwyn College, Cambridge, Downing College, Cambridge, Princeton University, Columbia University

Richard John Bowring (born 6 February 1947) is an English academic serving as Professor of Japanese Studies at the University of Cambridge and an Honorary Fellow of Downing College. He was Master of Selwyn College, Cambridge, from 2000 to 2012. In 2013, Bowring was awarded the Order of the Rising Sun 3rd Class, Gold Rays with Neck Ribbon for contributions to the development of Japanese studies, Japanese language education and the promotion of mutual understanding between Japan and the United Kingdom.

== Academic career ==
Richard Bowring attended Blundell's School and Downing College, Cambridge, graduating with a BA in Oriental Studies in 1968. He completed his doctoral thesis in the same field at the University of Cambridge in 1973. In addition to Cambridge, Bowring has taught at Princeton University and Columbia University.

In 2013, Bowring was awarded the Order of the Rising Sun 3rd Class, Gold Rays with Neck Ribbon for contributions to the development of Japanese studies, Japanese language education and the promotion of mutual understanding between Japan and the United Kingdom.

Since 1985, Bowring has been professor of Japanese Studies at the University of Cambridge. He has published broadly on a number of different international and political subjects in leading journals and newspapers. Additionally, he has produced a number of monographs and books on the politics and culture of East Asia.

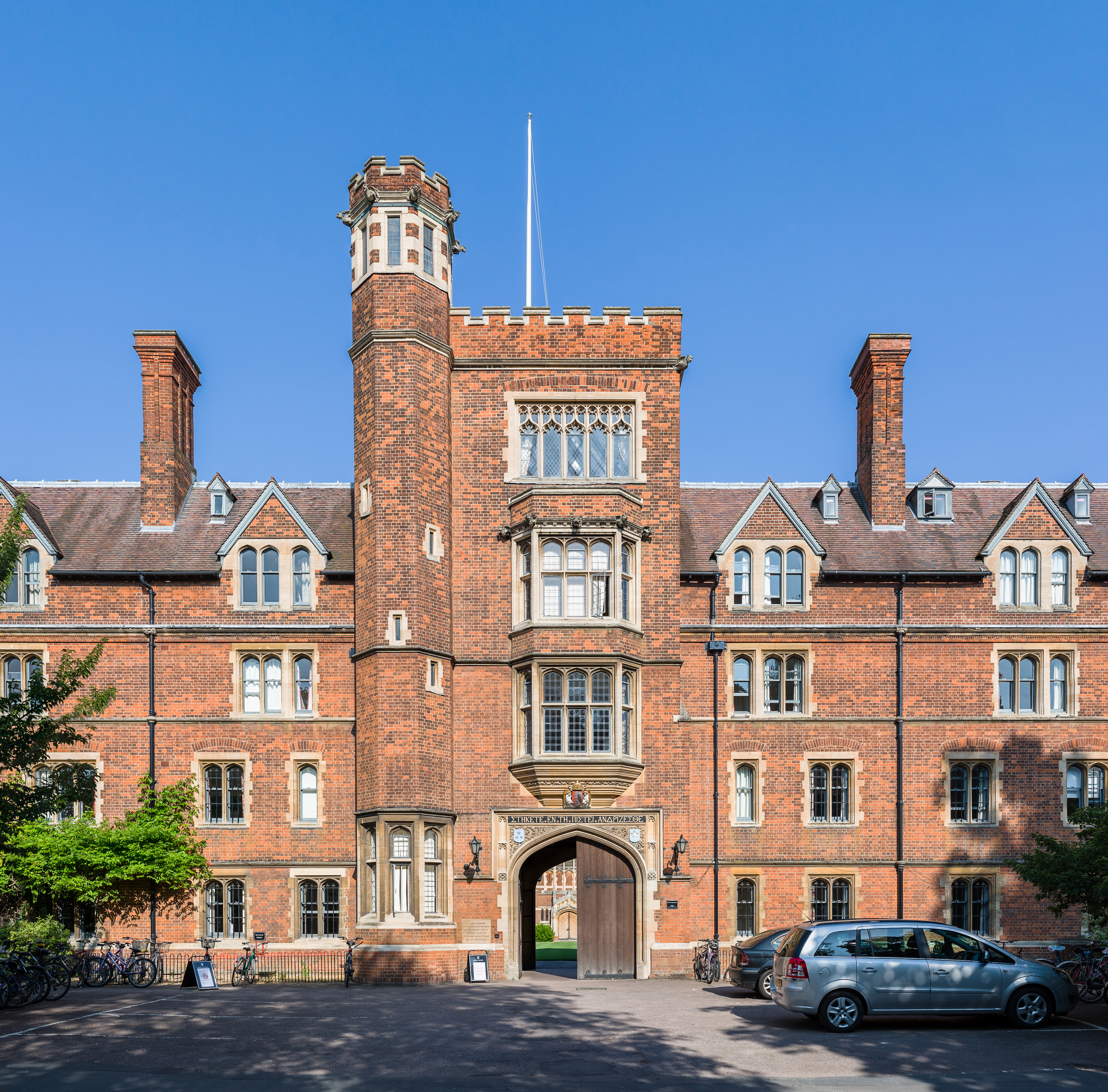
Selwyn College, Cambridge

== Master of Selwyn College, Cambridge ==
Bowring was Master of Selwyn College, Cambridge, from 2000 until 2012. During his time in office, he oversaw a major expansion of the college, including the construction of Ann's Court and several neo-revivalist Victorian stone and brick buildings, which were designed by the neo-classical architect Demetri Porphyrios.

During his tenure, the college became more oriented towards excellence in politics, history, and international studies.

== Honours and prizes ==
- Leverhulme Studentship (1973–75)
- Japan Foundation Fellowship, Tōkyō University (1975–76)
- Japan Foundation Professional Fellowship, Kyōto University (1980–1)
- Japan Foundation Professional Fellowship, Keiō University (1987)
- British Academy Research Readership (1995–97)
- Litt.D, University of Cambridge (1997)
- Honorary Fellowship at Downing College, Cambridge (2000)
- (Order of the Rising Sun, Gold Rays with Neck Ribbon, Third Class, 2013)

== Publications ==
Books

- 2023 ed. Brill's Encyclopedia of Buddhism, Vol. IV-2, History: Central and East Asia (Brill)
- 2017 In Search of the Way (Oxford University Press)
- 2005 The Religious Traditions of Japan 500–1600 (Cambridge University Press)
- 2002 (with H. Laurie) Cambridge Intermediate Japanese (Cambridge East Asia Institute)
- 1998 ed. Fifty years of Japanese at Cambridge 1948–98 (Privately published)
- 1996 The Diary of Lady Murasaki (Penguin Classics) [substantial revision of 1982 book]
- 1993 (with P. Kornicki) The Cambridge Encyclopedia of Japan (Cambridge University Press)
- 1992 (with H. Laurie) An Introduction to Modern Japanese, 2 vols (Cambridge University Press, reprinted 1993, 1994, 1995, 2002, paperback 2004)
- 1988 Murasaki Shikibu: The Tale of Genji, Landmarks of World Literature series (Cambridge University Press, reprinted 1991, second rev. ed. 2004)
- 1982 Murasaki Shikibu: Her Diary and Poetic Memoirs (Princeton University Press, reprinted 1985, paperback 1985, Italian trans. 1985)
- 1979 Mori Ōgai and the Modernization of Japanese Culture (Cambridge University Press)

Articles in Journals and Books

- 2006 'Fujiwara Seika and the Great Learning', Monumenta Nipponica 61.4: 437–57
- 1998 'Preparing for the Pure Land in Late Tenth-Century Japan', Japanese Journal of Religious Studies 25.3–4: 221–57
- 1995 'Kyōto as cultural crucible: women, poetry and nature in the tenth century’, in Kyōto: A Celebration of 1,200 years of History (SOAS, Japan Research Centre and Japan Soc. of London), pp. 7–17
- 1993 ‘Buddhist translations in the Northern Sung’, Asia Major, 3rd series, vol. 5.2 (1992): 79–93.
- 1992 ‘The Ise monogatari: a short cultural history’, Harvard Journal of Asiatic Studies 52.2: 401–80
- 1991 ‘An amused guest in all: Basil Hall Chamberlain (1850–1935)’, in H. Cortazzi and G. Daniels, eds. Britain and Japan 1859–1991: Themes and Personalities (Routledge), pp. 128–36 (Japanese tr. 1998)
- 1988 Articles on ‘Genroku culture’ and ‘Nō’, and short entries on ‘Futabatei Shimei’, ‘Lafcadio Hearn’, ‘Ihara Saikaku’, ‘Mishima Yukio’, ‘Mori Ōgai’, ‘Murasaki Shikibu’, ‘Nagai Kafū’, ‘Natsume Sōseki’, ‘Shiga Naoya’, ‘Taiheiki’, ‘Takizawa Bakin’, and ‘Tanizaki Jun’ichirō’, Ainslie T. Embree, ed., Encyclopedia of Asian History (NY: Charles Scribner’s Sons)
- 1985 ‘Japanese from the outside, reading in’, The Cambridge Review 106: 68–70
- 1984 ‘The female hand in Heian Japan: a first reading’, New York Literary Forum 12.13: 55–62 (reprinted in The Female Autograph, Chicago U. P., 1987)
- 1981 ‘Japanese diaries and the nature of literature’, Comparative Literature Studies 18.2: 167–74
- 1978 ‘Ōgai ni okeru genjitsu to geijutsu’, in K. Takeda, ed., Mori Ōgai: rekishi to bungaku (Meiji Shoin), pp. 73–88
- 1975 ‘The background to “Maihime”’, Monumenta Nipponica 30.2: 167–76
- 1974 ‘Louis L. Seaman to Mori Gun’ikan’, Hikaku bungaku kenkyū 26
- 1974 ‘Hon’yaku no gendai ni tsuite’, Ōgai zenshū geppō 27

Translations

- 2004 Mori Ōgai, ‘Nakajikiri’, in T. Rimer, ed., Not a Song Like any Other (University of Hawai’i Press), pp. 42–45
- 1994 Mori Ōgai, ‘Kinka’ and ‘Mōsō’, in T. Rimer, ed., Youth and Other Stories (University of Hawai’i Press), pp. 167–81, 259–73
- 1984 Watanabe Minoru, ‘Style and point of view in the Kagerō nikki’, Journal of Japanese Studies 10.2: 365–84
- 1977 Mori Ōgai, ‘Okitsu Yagoemon no isho’, in D. Dilworth and T. Rimer, eds, The Historical Works of Mori Ōgai, vol 1 (University of Hawai’i Press), pp. 17–22
- 1975 Mori Ōgai, ‘Maihime’, Monumenta Nipponica 30.2: 151–66 (reprinted in 1994)
- 1974 Mori Ōgai, ‘Utakata no ki’, in Monumenta Nipponica 29.3: 247–61

== Sources ==
- University of Cambridge, Website of the Faculty of Asian and Middle Eastern Studies, Extracted 3 June 2009

Academic offices
Preceded by Sir David Harrison	Master of Selwyn College, Cambridge; 2000–13	Succeeded by Roger Mosey
