= J. Mayo Greenberg =

American-Dutch astrochemist

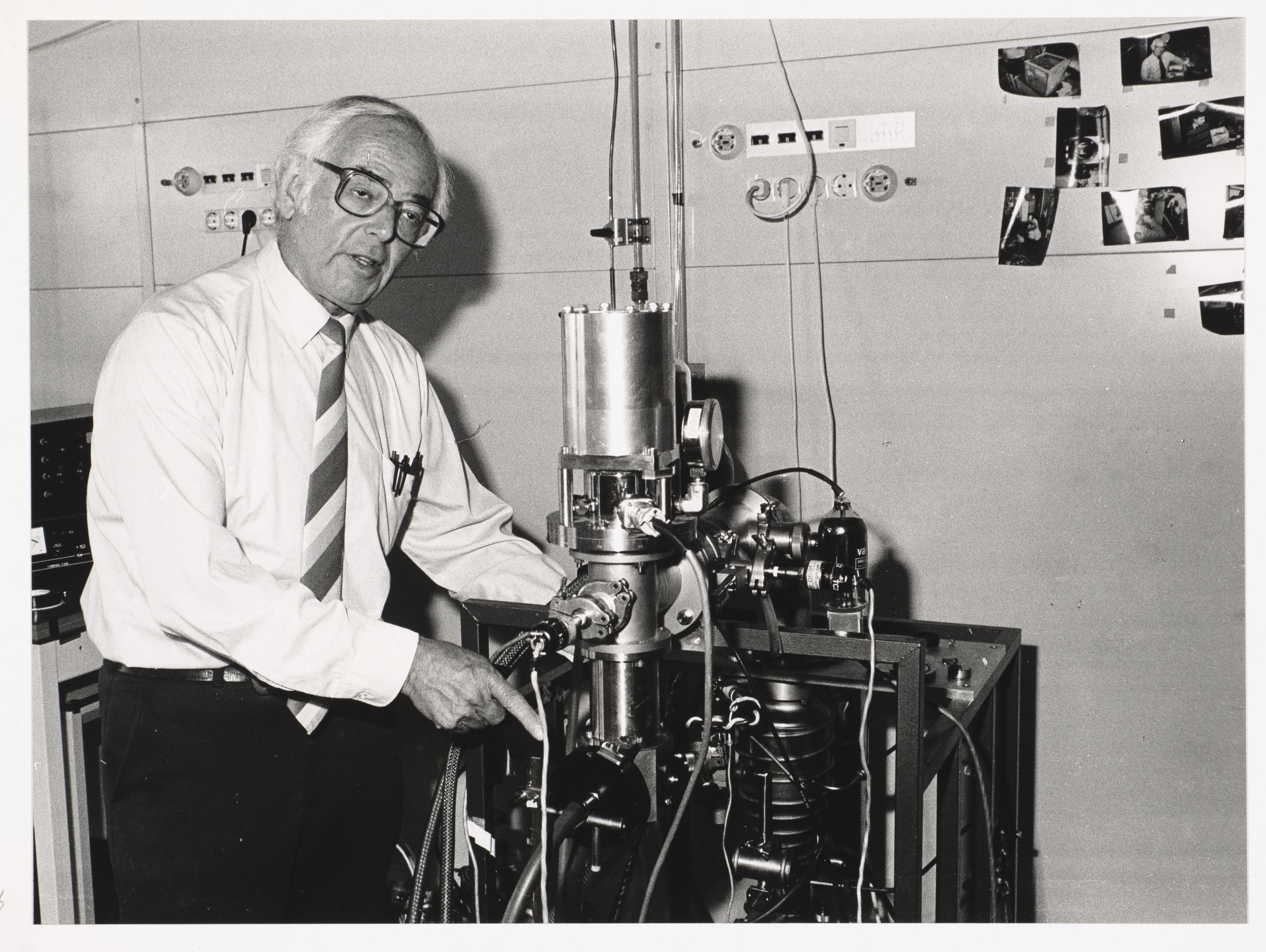
- Greenberg in his Leiden laboratory
- Born: Jerome Mayo Greenberg; January 14, 1922; Baltimore, Maryland, USA
- Died: November 29, 2001 (aged 79); Leiden, Netherlands
- Education: Johns Hopkins University
- Scientific career
- Fields: Laboratory astrophysics, astrochemistry
- Institutions: Rensselaer Polytechnic Institute; SUNY Albany; Leiden University
- Thesis: Considerations of Very Small Angle Atomic Scattering with Application to Scattering Losses in the Synchrotron (1948)
- Doctoral advisor: Theodore H. Berlin
- Doctoral students: Noah Brosch, Peter Jenniskens

Jerome Mayo Greenberg (14 January 1922 – 29 November 2001) was an American astrophysicist and experimental astrochemist, best known for his work on the composition and optical properties of interstellar dust and for founding the first laboratory dedicated to simulating interstellar dust and ice grains under realistic space conditions. He is also regarded as the founding father of the laboratory astrophysics.

== Early life and education ==
Greenberg was born in Baltimore, Maryland, in 1922. A gifted child, he entered Johns Hopkins University to study physics at the age of fifteen and graduated two years later. His studies were interrupted by the Second World War, during which he worked at Langley Field, Virginia, modelling airflow over aircraft wing surfaces. He returned to Johns Hopkins and completed his PhD in 1948 with a dissertation on the scattering of radiation by matter, supervised by Theodore H. Berlin. In 1947 he married Naomi Slovin; they had four children and remained married until his death.

== Career in the United States ==
After postdoctoral positions at the University of Delaware and the University of Maryland, Greenberg joined Rensselaer Polytechnic Institute (RPI) in Troy, New York, in 1952, rising to full professor; there his interests turned to astronomy. He also worked at the Institute for Advanced Study at Princeton, Dudley Observatory, and the State University of New York at Albany, where he chaired the physics department from 1970.

Greenberg and Norman Peterson built a microwave scattering laboratory at RPI to study the problem of light scattering by non-spherical dust grains, using scaled particles and microwave radiation as analogues for starlight scattering by interstellar grains. During two 1960s sabbaticals at Leiden he worked closely with Henk van de Hulst and Jan Oort, whose "dirty ice" grain models he sought to extend.

== Leiden and the Laboratory for Astrophysics ==
In 1975, at the age of 53, Greenberg accepted a chair in laboratory astrophysics created at Leiden University and moved to the Netherlands, where he lived for the rest of his life. There he founded the Laboratory for Astrophysics (Laboratorium voor Astrofysica), the first such laboratory, built to reproduce interstellar dust and ice grains under realistic conditions and to interpret astronomical observations. He directed the laboratory until his retirement in 1992. From 1989 to 1997 he also directed the NATO International School of Space Chemistry.

== Scientific contributions ==
Greenberg was an expert in cometary structure and composition, and helped establish interstellar dust as a modern discipline. He wrote the "Interstellar Grains" review chapter for Annual Review of Astronomy and Astrophysics in 1963 and organized the first international conference on the subject in 1965. His roughly 140-page 1968 monograph, also titled "Interstellar Grains", gave a comprehensive treatment of grain composition, size, and shape, including graphite-core/ice-mantle models, and long served as a standard reference. He also described the stochastic temperature fluctuations of very small grains, arguing that "grain temperature" is not meaningful when single photons dominate; the effect was confirmed by the IRAS satellite in 1983.

Greenberg proposed a new emission mode for interstellar dust particles, and predicted that optically opaque grains in molecular clouds are very cold, 5-10 K.

From the early 1970s, Greenberg promoted the then-controversial idea that icy grain mantles play a central role in astrochemistry. In the Leiden laboratory he and his group synthesized complex organic molecules from simple ices under simulated interstellar conditions, producing a refractory organic residue whose colour and spectral properties resembled the surface of Halley's Comet as measured by spacecraft. He published more than 300 papers, 146 of them after moving to Leiden.

== Death and legacy ==
Greenberg died of pancreatic cancer at his home in Leiden on 29 November 2001. In 1998 the philanthropists Raymond and Beverly Sackler endowed the Raymond and Beverly Sackler Laboratory for Astrophysics at Leiden, securing the laboratory; after his death the J. Mayo Greenberg Scholarship Prize was established for students from developing countries.
