= Owen Chadwick =

British historian and academic (1916–2015)

The Reverend Owen Chadwick OM KBE FRSE FBA
- Born: William Owen Chadwick; 20 May 1916; Bromley, England
- Died: 17 July 2015 (aged 99); Cambridge, England
- Education: University of Cambridge, St John's College, Cambridge

William Owen Chadwick OM KBE FRSE FBA (20 May 1916 – 17 July 2015) was a British Anglican priest, academic, rugby international, writer and prominent historian of Christianity. As a leading academic, Chadwick became Dixie Professor of Ecclesiastical History in 1958, serving until 1968, and from 1968 to 1983 was Regius Professor of History. Chadwick was elected master of Selwyn College, Cambridge, and served from 1956 to 1983.

In his obituaries, Chadwick was described as "one of the great religious historians of our time" by The Independent, and as "one of the most remarkable men of letters of the 20th century" by The Guardian.

== Early life and education ==
Owen Chadwick
- School: Tonbridge School
- University: University of Cambridge, Selwyn College, Cambridge, St John's College, Cambridge

Rugby union career
- Position: Hooker
Senior career
Years	Team	Apps	(Points)
1936–1938	Cambridge University		
International career
Years	Team	Apps	(Points)
1936	British Isles XV		

Chadwick was born in Bromley, Kent, in 1916, the third of six children of John Chadwick, a barrister, and his wife Edith (née Horrocks). His father died in 1925. He was an elder brother of the Very Reverend Henry Chadwick, also a distinguished professor and historian of the early Church, and a younger brother of Sir John Chadwick KCMG, a diplomat whose senior posting was as British Ambassador to Romania.

His eldest brother was sent to Eton College, but Chadwick was educated at Tonbridge School from 1929 to 1935. He was school captain and captain of the rugby team. He then studied classics at St John's College, Cambridge. He received three Blues in rugby playing as hooker for Cambridge University R.U.F.C. in the annual Varsity Match against Oxford University in 1936, 1937 and 1938 (as captain). In 1936, during his first year at Cambridge, he was selected to tour with a British Lions team in their third trip to Argentina. Although no caps were awarded on this tour, Chadwick did play in the one match against the full Argentina side, playing in his favoured position of hooker in a 23–0 victory. The British team won all ten of its matches. During the 1937/38 season, Chadwick played for invitational touring side, the Barbarians.

Chadwick graduated with a First in History in 1938. Having been influenced by Martin Charlesworth and Martin Niemöller in 1938, he took a First in theology at Cambridge in 1939. He then attended Cuddesdon Theological College and was ordained to the diaconate and priesthood of the Church of England in 1940 and 1941, respectively.

He served as a curate at St John's Church in Huddersfield for two years and was then chaplain of Wellington College in Berkshire until the end of the Second World War.

He also played rugby during the war, for Blackheath, and for an England team that played against New Zealand.

== Cambridge career ==
After the war, he was made chaplain and Fellow of Trinity Hall, Cambridge, in 1947, and then Dean of Chapel. He became a university theology lecturer in 1949 and published his first book on the 5th-century monk John Cassian in 1950.

In 1958 he was named Dixie Professor of Ecclesiastical History at Cambridge University. He then became an honorary fellow at St John's College, Cambridge, in 1964. A few years later, in 1968, he was elected to the position of Regius Professor of Modern History, an ancient chair, which he held until 1982, and was President of the British Academy during the early 1980s. As vice-chancellor from 1969 to 1971, he guided Cambridge through turbulent times in the late 1960s, including the Garden House riot in 1970. He was also elected president of Cambridge University RFC in 1973.

In the 1960s and 1970s, he was suggested as a potential Archbishop of Canterbury, but is thought to have declined the offer of a bishop's mitre more than once. He chaired the Archbishops' Commission on Church and State (1966–1970), known as the Chadwick Commission, which recommended that Parliament should pass the regulation of the church to a General Synod rather than disestablishment.

He was Hensley Henson Lecturer in Theology at Oxford University in 1975–76, and Ford Lecturer in English History at Oxford in 1980–81. He retired as Regius Professor and master of Selwyn College, Cambridge, in 1983. He had become a fellow of the British Academy in 1962, and was its president from 1981 to 1985. He was also a trustee of the National Portrait Gallery from 1978 to 1994, and was chancellor of the University of East Anglia from 1984 to 1994.

Owen Chadwick served as a member of the Historical Manuscripts Commission for a period prior to 1992.

== Selwyn College, Cambridge ==
Chadwick was elected master of Selwyn College, Cambridge, in 1955. Installed in 1956, Chadwick was the longest-serving Master of Selwyn by the time he retired after 27 years, in 1983. During his time as master, Selwyn became a full college of Cambridge University, in 1958 (though it had been founded back in 1882), and it ceased to require its students to be communicant members of the Church of England. As Master of Selwyn, Chadwick completed several major building projects, including the new Cripps Court (not to be confused with the similarly named Cripps at Queens' College, Cambridge). Selwyn College was not the first Oxbridge college to admit women students alongside men, but it adopted the practice relatively early on in 1976. Under Chadwick's years as master, the numbers of fellows and postgraduates at Selwyn were doubled, greatly increasing the research output of the college. Chadwick took a keen interest in college sports and was elected to membership of the Hermes Club.

== Books ==
Chadwick wrote about such issues as the formation of the papacy in the modern world; about Lord Acton; about the Protestant Reformation in the 16th century; about the Church of England in the United Kingdom and elsewhere, and about the secularisation of Europe in thought and culture. He participated in the debate about the role of Pope Pius XII and the Holocaust during World War II.

With his brother, Henry, Chadwick edited the Oxford History of the Christian Church (1981–2010), to which he contributed three of its twelve volumes: "The Popes and European Revolution" (1980); "A History of the Popes 1830–1914" (1998); and "The Early Reformation on the Continent" (2003). Chadwick was awarded the Wolfson History Prize in 1981.

Owen Chadwick was also General Editor of the Penguin (formerly Pelican) History of the Church, to which he contributed the third volume (The Reformation), the seventh (The Christian Church in the Cold War, 1992) and the last two chapters of the sixth ("A History of Christian Missions", second edition 1986). His brother Henry wrote the first volume in the series (The Early Church, 1967).

Among Chadwick's other books are:

- John Cassian: A Study in Primitive Monasticism (1950)
- The Founding of Cuddesdon (1954)
- From Bossuet to Newman (1957)
- The Sayings of the Fathers (1958)
- Mackenzie’s Grave (1959) (on a bishop sent to the Zambesi in the 19th century)
- Victorian Miniature (1960) (based on parallel diaries of the squire and parson at Ketteringham in Norfolk covering several decades of the early 19th century)
- The Victorian Church (in two volumes, 1966 and 1970)
- The Secularization of the European Mind in the 19th Century (1975) (based on his Gifford Lectures in 1973–74)
- Newman (in the OUP's "Past Masters" series; 1983)
- Hensley Henson: A study in the Friction between Church and State (1983)
- A History of Christianity (1995)
- The Early Reformation on the Continent (2001)

== Honours ==
Chadwick was appointed Knight Commander of the Most Excellent Order of the British Empire (KBE) in the 1982 New Year Honours. As a priest he did not receive the accolade and so remained styled as "The Revd Owen Chadwick" rather than "Sir Owen Chadwick". In 1985 he wrote 'The Knighthood of the Clergy', discussing and contradicting the generalised ‘tradition’. He was appointed to the Order of Merit (OM) on 11 November 1983. A memorial to him and his brother was unveiled at Westminster Abbey on 2 February 2018.

== Personal life ==
Chadwick married Ruth Hallward in 1949; she died before him, in January 2015. He was survived by two sons and two daughters. Chadwick died at the age of 99 on 17 July 2015.

After retiring, Chadwick lived with his wife in Newnham, in Cambridge, but also spent time in Cley next the Sea in Norfolk, where he was priest in charge.

Academic offices
Preceded by Norman Sykes	Dixie Professor of Ecclesiastical History, University of Cambridge; 1958–1968	Succeeded by Ernest Gordon Rupp
Preceded by Herbert Butterfield	Regius Professor of Modern History, Cambridge; 1968–1982	Succeeded by Geoffrey Elton
Preceded by William Telfer	Master of Selwyn College, Cambridge; 1956–1983	Succeeded by Sir Alan Cook
Preceded by Eric Ashby, Baron Ashby	Vice-Chancellor of the University of Cambridge; 1969–1971	Succeeded by William Alexander Deer
Preceded by Lord Franks	Chancellor of the University of East Anglia; 1984–1994	Succeeded by Sir Geoffrey Allen
