= Alan Brooke (priest) =

English academic (1863–1939)

Alan England Brooke, DD, FBA (1 September 1863 – 29 October 1939) was an English academic.

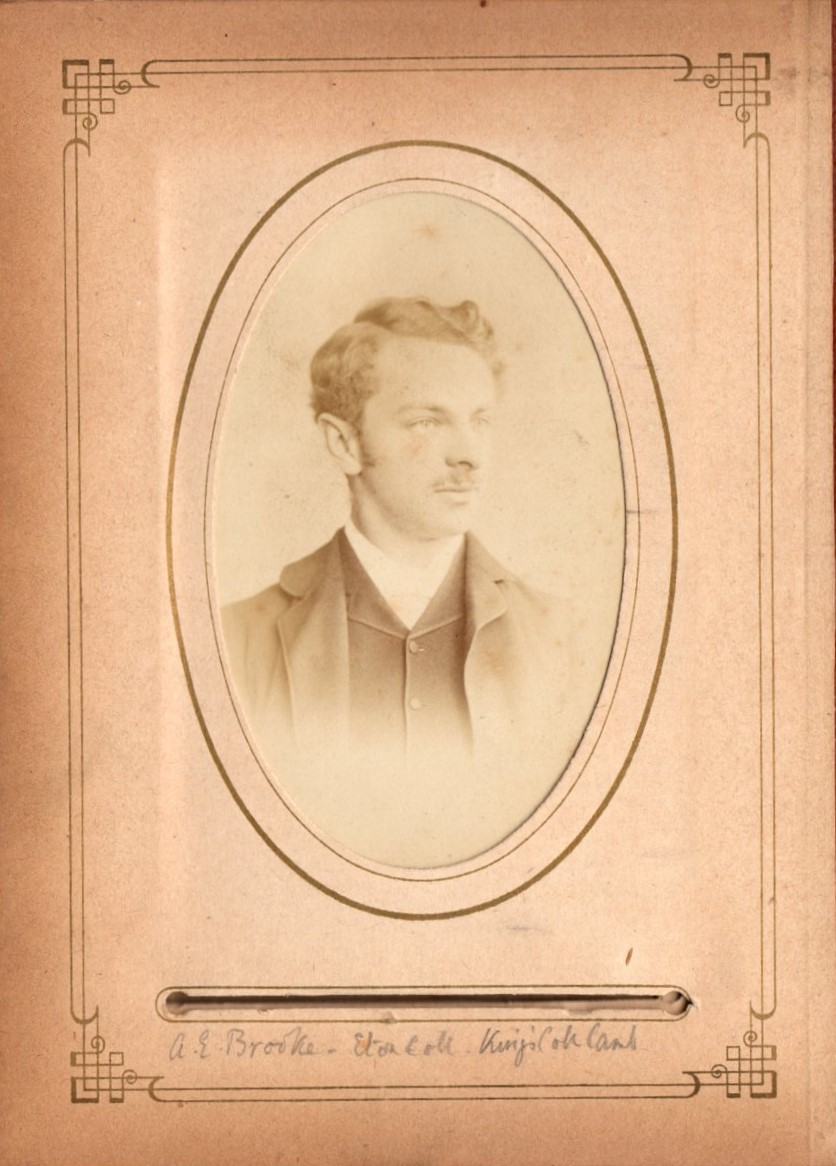
A. E. Brooke (1863-1939), Eton College & Kings College Cambridge

Brooke was born in Pembrokeshire and educated at Eton College. He entered King's College, Cambridge in 1883, graduating B.A in 1886 and M.A in 1890. He was Fellow of Kings from 1889 to 1926; and Provost of King's College, Cambridge from 1926 to 1933. Brooke was ordained a priest in the Church of England in 1904. After a curacy at Gayton he was Ely Professor of Divinity from 1916 to 1926, and Canon of Ely during the same period. He was an Honorary Chaplain to the King from 1918 until his death.

== Publications ==
- S. Luke: the Historian of the Infancy. A Sermon.
- The Old Testament in Greek, according to the text of Codex Vaticanus, supplemented from other uncial manuscripts, with a critical apparatus containing the variants of the chief ancient authorities for the text of the Septuagint;
- A Critical and Exegetical Commentary on the Johannine Epistles
- The Commentary of Origen on S. John's Gospel: the text revised with a critical introduction and indices
