= Martin Charlesworth =

Martin Percival Charlesworth (18 January 1895 – 26 October 1950) was a classical scholar.

He was born in Eastham, then in Cheshire, the son of Rev Ambrose Charlesworth, the curate of the parish, and Alice Whish. He was educated at Birkenhead School and Jesus College, Cambridge, where he was a Rustat Scholar. He served as an officer in the Egyptian Labour Corps in the Middle East during the First World War. He was placed in the first division of the first class in part one of the Classical Tripos 1920 and in first class in part two in 1921 with distinction in Ancient History.

He became a visiting fellow of Princeton (1921–1922) before becoming a fellow of Jesus College in 1921 and then at St John's College, Cambridge (1923–1931). He was appointed to the Laurence Readership in Classics in 1931. In 1927 he was appointed editor of the multi-volume The Cambridge Ancient History until its publication in 1932. He was elected President of St John's in 1937. Owen Chadwick described Charlesworth as "a wonderful teacher; a rip-roaring man, full of go and humour, and generosity". He was ordained in 1940, but held no post in the Church. He received honorary degrees from the University of Wales and the University of Bordeaux. During the Second World War he was an active recruiter of talent for code-breakers to be sent to Bletchley Park and for classicists to be sent to the Bedford Japanese School for training as Japanese cryptographers. He died in Leeds in 1950 after a heart attack following an expedition to Hadrian's Wall.

== Publications ==
- Trade Routes and Commerce in the Roman Empire (Cambridge, Eng.: University Press,1924) (also translated into French & Italian)
- Five Men : Character Studies from the Roman Empire (Cambridge, MA: Harvard, 1936)
- The Virtues of a Roman Emperor : Propaganda and the Creation of Belief, (London: Milford, 1937)
- Documents Illustrating the Reigns of Claudius and Nero (Cambridge, Eng.: University Press, 1939)
- The Lost Province, or The Worth of Britain (Cardiff, Wales: University of Wales Press, 1949)
