= Theodore H. Berlin =

American theoretical physicist (1917–1962)

- Born: May 8, 1917; New York City, United States
- Died: November 16, 1962 (aged 45); Baltimore, United States
- Education: University of Michigan (PhD)
- Scientific career
- Fields: Statistical mechanics
- Institutions: Johns Hopkins University; Rockefeller University
- Doctoral advisor: Kazimierz Fajans
- Doctoral students: Louis Witten, J. Mayo Greenberg

Theodore H. Berlin (8 May 1917, New York City – 16 November 1962, Baltimore) was an American theoretical physicist.

== Education and career ==
Berlin graduated in 1939 with a B.S. in chemical engineering from Cooper Union. He graduated in 1940 with M.S. and in 1944 with Ph.D. from the University of Michigan. His thesis advisor was Kazimierz Fajans. During the war, Berlin worked on the development of the proximity fuze. His thesis was on the quantization and electric interaction in diatomic molecules.

He was a research physicist from 1944 to 1946 at the University of Michigan, a lecturer from 1946 to 1947 at Johns Hopkins University, and an associate professor from 1948 to 1949 at Northwestern University. At Johns Hopkins University he was from 1949 to 1954 an associate professor and from 1955 to 1961 a full professor. As a Guggenheim Fellow for the academic year 1952–1953, he was at the Institute for Advanced Study on leave of absence from Johns Hopkins. From 1961 until his death from a heart attack in 1962, he was a full professor at the Rockefeller University.

In 1961 he joined the Rockefeller Institute where he worked with George E. Uhlenbeck and Mark Kac in developing a school of physics and mathematics. While at Michigan he had studied under Prof. Uhlenbeck, and at the time of his death the two were collaborating on a book on statistical physics.

Berlin was a Fellow of the American Physical Society. He was an associate editor for the Journal of Chemical Physics, Physical Review, and Physical Review Letters. He was appointed to the editorial board of The Physics of Fluids, starting on 1 January 1962. His doctoral students include Louis Witten.

== Scientific output ==
At the beginning of his career, Berlin did research on physical chemistry (quantum theory of molecules). He is known for his work with Kac on the spherical model, a generalization of the Ising model of statistical mechanics, which was developed as a mathematical model for ferromagnetism. In contrast to the Ising model, the spherical model's spin variable on the lattice can assume continuous values (with the restriction that the sum of the squares of the spins is equal to the number of lattice positions). The spherical model can be solved exactly in the presence of an external field and shares that property of exact solvability with very few models of ferromagnetism.

== Personal life ==
In 1944 Berlin married Patricia May Cleary. They had four children.
