= John Martin Creed =

Church of England clergyman and theologian

John Martin Creed, FBA (14 October 1889 – 17 February 1940) was an English theologian and clergyman. The son of a vicar, he was educated at Wyggeston Grammar School in Leicester and Gonville and Caius College, Cambridge (graduating in 1912). He was ordained a priest and elected a fellow at Gonville and Caius in 1914, where he was chaplain from 1915 to 1917. After being a Chaplain to the Forces (1917–19), he was a fellow of St John's College, Cambridge, from 1919 until he died. He was also Ely Professor of Divinity from 1926 until his death. He gave the Hulsean Lectures in 1936, and in 1939 he was elected a Fellow of the British Academy.
