= Phil Harding (BBC executive) =

Phil Harding is a journalist, broadcaster and media consultant. Previously he was a producer, editor and senior executive at the BBC.

== Career ==
Phil Harding is a journalist and active citizen. He is a former BBC executive. He left the Corporation in 2007 and subsequently worked as a consultant for various media organisations internationally and in Britain. At the BBC, Harding held a wide variety of senior editorial jobs. He was Director of English Networks and News for the World Service, Controller of Editorial Policy (responsible for the editorial standards of all BBC output and writing the BBC's editorial guidelines), and Editor of the Today programme on Radio 4, during which time the programme won five Sony Gold awards. He also headed the project which led to the founding of BBC Radio 5 Live and became the networks' first Editor of News Programmes. He was also Chief Political Adviser for the BBC and deputy editor of Panorama.

== Academic contributions ==
Harding leads courses at the BBC's College of Journalism on editorial leadership.

He is the author of a report for Oxfam on international coverage and the future of U.K. public broadcasting – The Great Global Switch Off. He also writes for the Guardiannewspaper.

== Accolades ==
He is a Trustee of the Press Association and of the One World Broadcasting Trust. He is a Fellow of the Society of Editors and of the Radio Academy.

Media offices
Preceded by Jenny Abramsky	Editor of Today; 1987–1993	Succeeded by Roger Mosey
