= Laboratory astrophysics =

Laboratory astrophysics is an experimental branch of astrophysics, focused on modelling and simulating conditions found in stars, interplanetary space, and other objects in a laboratory.

J. Mayo Greenberg, who founded the Laboratory for Astrophysics at Leiden University, is regarded as the founding father of the field.
