= William Telfer (academic) =

The Revd Canon William Telfer MC (16 January 1886 – 13 January 1968) was an English clergyman and academic, who specialised in early Christian studies. Telfer held various prestigious positions throughout his career, including Dean of Clare College, Cambridge (1921), Ely Professor of Divinity at Cambridge University (1944–1947) and Master of Selwyn College, Cambridge (1947–1956).

Telfer was born in Rochester, Kent, the son of a schoolmaster. After graduating from Clare College in 1908, he was ordained and became the Vicar of All Saints Church in Rotherhithe, which was later destroyed by a bomb in 1944. In 1921, Telfer returned to his alma mater as a Fellow. Even after retiring, he continued to write on theological subjects.

During the First World War, Telfer served as a chaplain and was awarded the Military Cross in the 1916 Birthday Honours.

== Publications ==
- The Treasure of São Roque: A Sidelight on the Counter-reformation. SPCK. 1932. ISBN 9785871241141.
- 'Cyril of Jerusalem and Nemesius of Emesa. Westminster Press. 1955.
- The Forgiveness of Sins: An Essay in the History of Christian Doctrine and Practice. SCM Press. 1959.
- Office of a Bishop. Darton, Longman & Todd Ltd. 1962.
- Faversham Abbey and Its Last Abbot, John Caslock: a Paper Read Before the Faversham Society on Thursday 19 March 1964, Faversham Society, 1965

Academic offices
| Preceded by George Armitage Chase | Master of Selwyn College, Cambridge; 1947–1956 | Succeeded by Owen Chadwick |
