= Queens' College Old Library =

Original Library of Queens' College, Cambridge

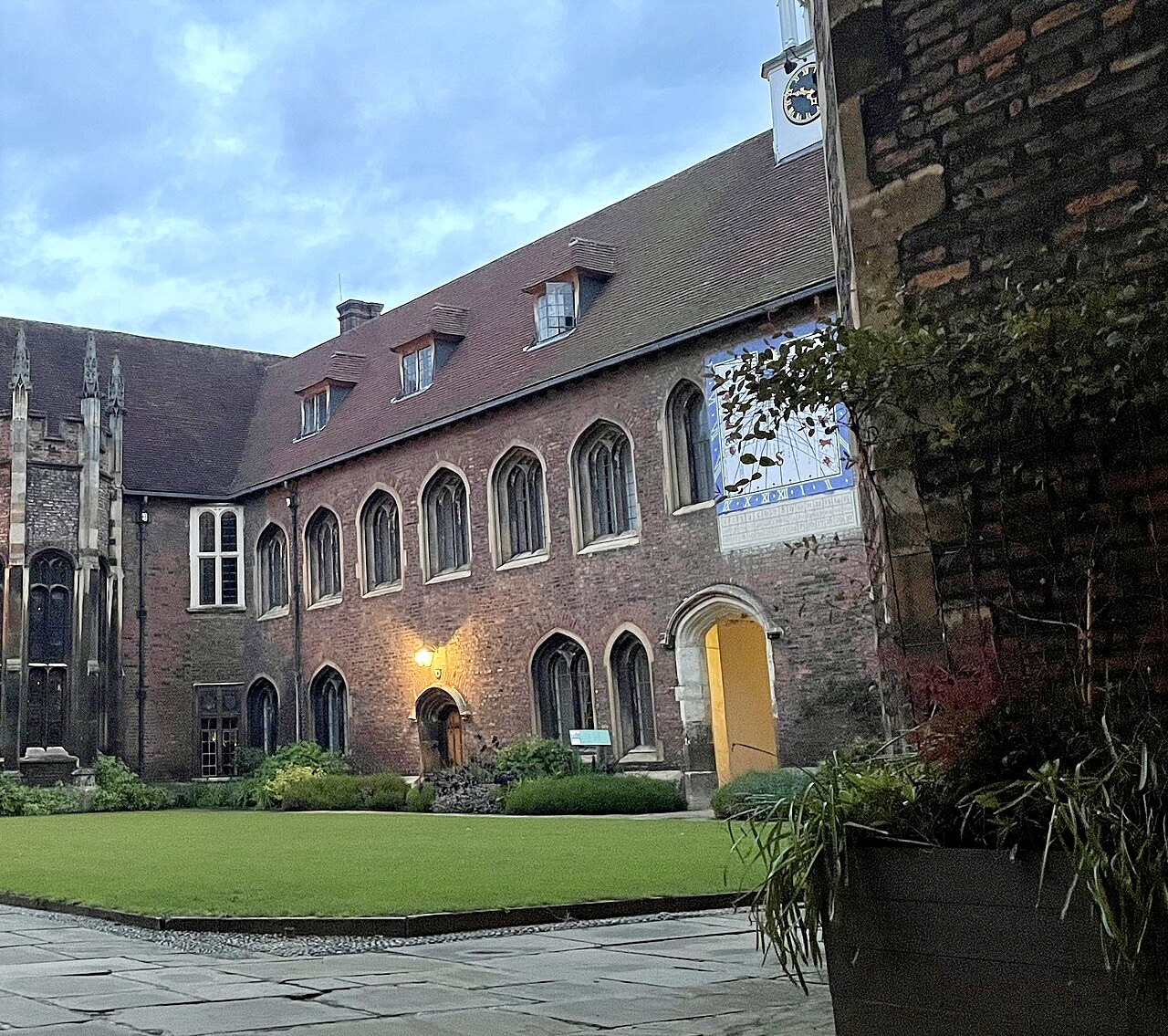
- Interactive map of Queens' College Old Library
- 52.2025°N 0.1155°E
- Location: Queens' College, Cambridge; Cambridge, Cambridgeshire; United Kingdom

History
- Built: 1448

Site notes
- Architect: Original architect unknown (speculated Reginald Ely)

Listed Building – Grade I
- Official name: Queens' College, the Buildings Surrounding Front Court, Cloister Court, Pump Court, and Walnut Tree Court
- Designated: 26 April 1950
- Reference no.: 1087041

The Queens' College Old Library is a historic library at Queens' College, Cambridge. The library was established as part of the college's foundation in 1448 and contains approximately 30,000 volumes spanning the 12th to 19th centuries.

Dr Tim Eggington is the current Keeper of the Old Library at Queens'.

== Description ==
The Old Library comprises a single room in the north side of Old Court, which has been in continual use as a library since its foundation. Adjacent to the college's original chapel, the room can be accessed from a passageway connecting to Walnut Tree Court.

The interior retains its original medieval desks and bookshelves, made from older medieval lecterns, arranged perpendicularly to the north and south walls. Unlike many libraries of a similar age, a large number of medieval books in the collection have retained their original bindings, due to Queens' being unable to afford then-popular rebindings in the 18th century. For these reasons, the Old Library's website claims that "of all Oxbridge libraries, it remains closest to its original state".

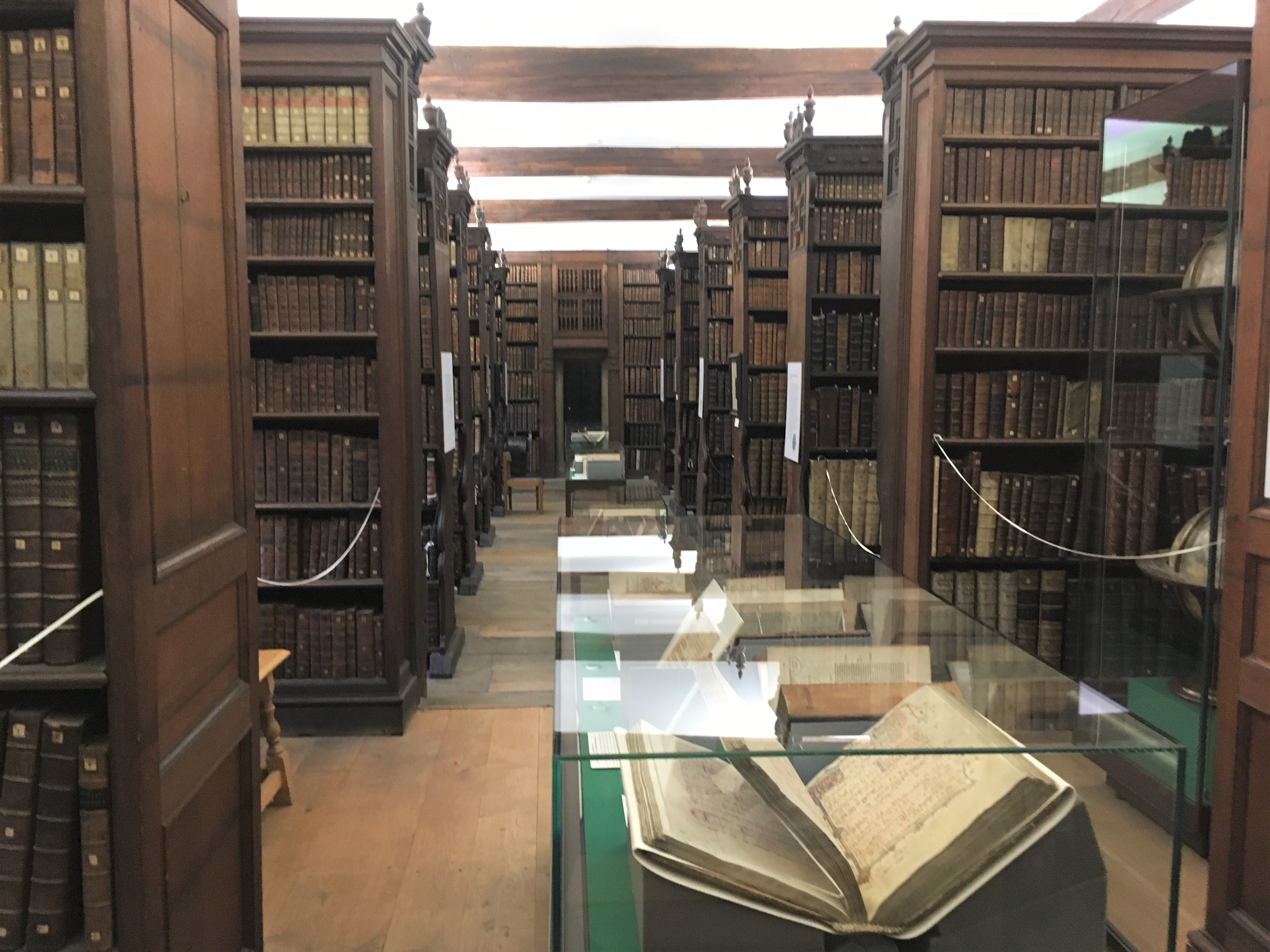
The main corridor of the library, with books on display for a public exhibition.

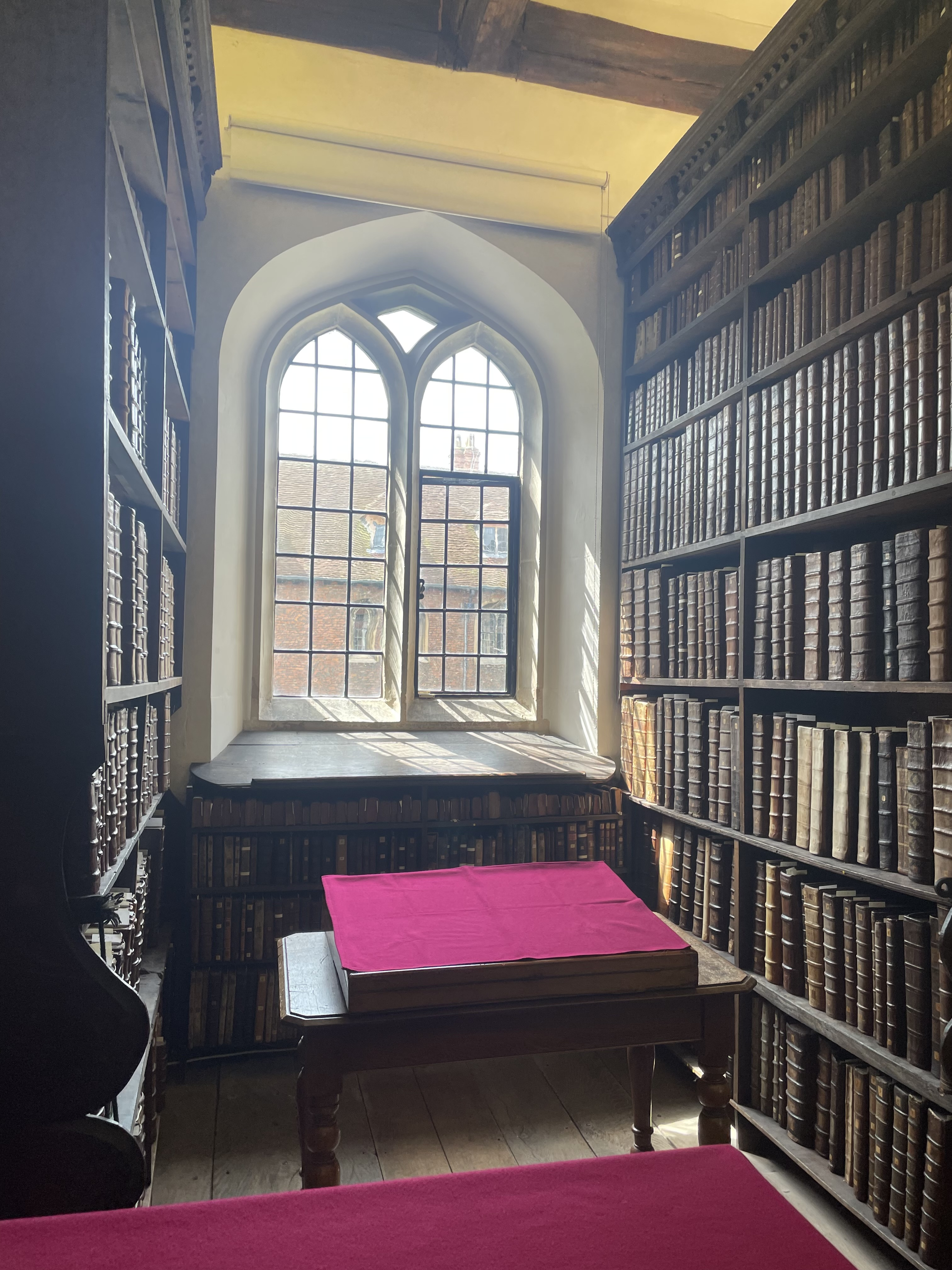
A southern window looking into Old Court.

== History ==
The Old Library dates from the foundation of Queens' College in 1448. The library's original layout comprised ten two-tier reading lecterns, each with double slopes, which allowed room for approximately 200 manuscripts. The volumes were chained to the lecterns in the 15th and early 16th centuries, and the location of the chain-bars is still traceable today.

An inventory attributed to Andrew Dokett, the college's first president, indicates that the library had reached capacity by 1472, mostly filled with manuscript titles. Although these titles had all disappeared by 1538, the college still possessed one of the largest contemporary collections in Cambridge at the time, primarily composed of printed books.

Initially, books were shelved horizontally, but began to stand upright in the 16th century with their spines facing inward. The lecterns were converted into bookshelves in 1612, and additional shelving was inserted in the mid-17th century. By this point, it became more common for books to be shelved with their spines out.

Isaac Milner (1750–1820) bequeathed the college a particularly extensive collection of books during his tenure as president of the college, including his first editions of Isaac Newton, anti-slave trade pamphlets, and 16th-century copies of Erasmus.

=== Cataloguing ===
A detailed catalogue of the library's collection was published by Thomas Hartwell Horne in 1827. It is now considered an early example of subject indexing in a library context, given that the Dewey Decimal Classification was not introduced until nearly 50 years later. However, Horne's catalogue contains numerous inaccuracies.

Since 2015, the Old Library team has been systematically cataloguing the collection, with records becoming available on iDiscover, the online catalogue of Cambridge libraries.

== Notable Items ==
The library has a number of interesting features and texts, including:

- First edition copies of numerous important scientific works, including those of Charles Darwin, Isaac Newton, and Johannes Kepler.
- What are believed to be the earliest English celestial globes, owned once by Queens' fellow of mathematics Sir Thomas Smith (1513–1577).
- Five stained glass windows purchased from a neighboring Carmelite friary amid its dissolution in 1538, containing one of the few surviving collections of 15th-century English roundels.
- Four 12th-century bindings exemplifying techniques previously thought to be lost outside of 20th-century reconstructions.

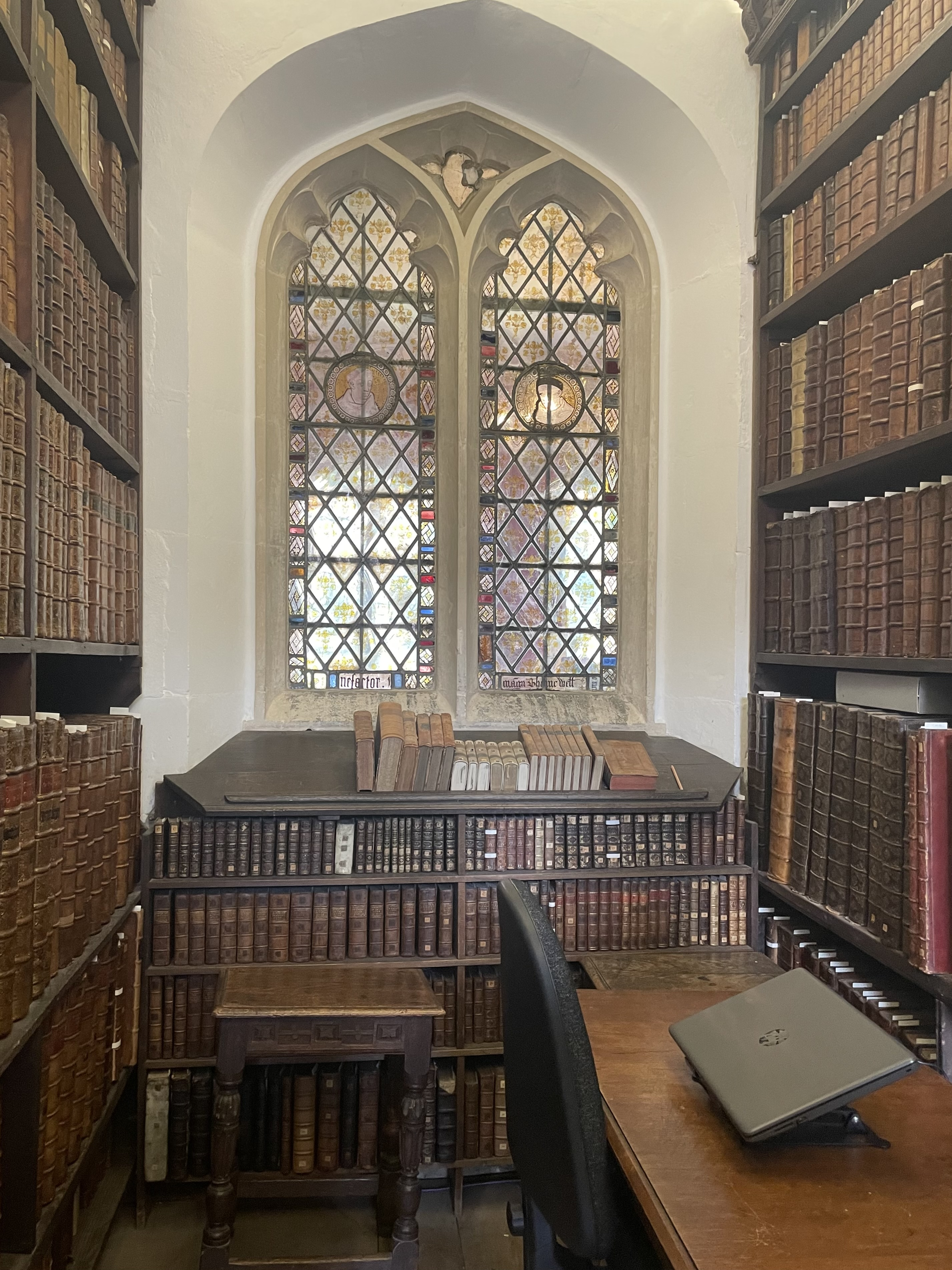
A northern stained glass window including 15th-century Carmelite roundels.

== Visiting ==
The library is accessible to college members and visitors by appointment, and periodically hosts exhibitions open to the public.
