= Roger Mosey =

British broadcaster; College Head

- Born: Roger Mosey; 4 January 1958 (age 68); Grappenhall, Cheshire, England
- Education: Wadham College, Oxford; University of Oxford
- Occupations: Selwyn College, Cambridge (Master); British Broadcasting Corporation (Director of News)
- Known for: Author, broadcaster, academia
- Predecessor: Richard Bowring
- Successor: Suzanne Raine

Roger Mosey (born 4 January 1958) is a British author, broadcaster, and former Master of Selwyn College, Cambridge. He was previously the Head of BBC Television News and Director of the Beijing 2008 and London 2012 Olympic Games coverage. His other positions have included that of Producer to the BBC's New York bureau, Editor of Today on BBC Radio 4, and BBC editorial director. He is a trustee of the Royal Institute of British Architects. He often contributes articles and columns to international newspapers including The Guardian, The Times, The Spectator, the New Statesman, and the Daily Telegraph.

== Education ==
Mosey grew up in Bradford and was educated at Bradford Grammar School. He then studied at Wadham College, Oxford, where he received a degree in history and modern languages. He appeared on University Challenge in 1978, as a member of the team representing his college.

== Career ==
After university he joined Pennine Radio, Bradford, as a Community Affairs Producer; his BBC career began in 1980 when he joined BBC Radio Lincolnshire as a reporter. His first job in network radio was on The Week in Westminster, and he then moved to Today Programme as a producer and to the BBC's New York bureau before becoming editor of PM in 1987.

He was editor of Radio 4's Today from March 1993 until appointment as Controller of BBC Radio 5 Live at the beginning of 1997. Under his editorship, Today won Sony Gold Awards in 1994 and 1995 and was named "Radio Programme of the Year" by the Broadcasting Press Guild in 1995.BBC Radio 5 Live was named the Sony National Radio Station of the Year 1998. BBC Television News won a number of Royal Television Society awards for journalism, including "Programme of the Year" for Newsnight (2002) and the Ten O'Clock News (2004). The Ten O'Clock News also received BAFTA awards in both 2004 and 2005.

He recruited James Naughtie to join the Today presenting team and introduced Nicky Campbell, Victoria Derbyshire and Richard Littlejohn to Five Live. He brought Dermot Murnaghan and Natasha Kaplinsky to the BBC to present Breakfast. He is a Fellow of The Radio Academy.

In 2003, when Head of News at the BBC, Mosey was asked to head a landmark workstream looking at the BBC's values. As Head of Sport he cancelled Grandstand after a 48-year run and oversaw the move to Salford Quays in 2010. He was replaced as Head of Sport by Barbara Slater. He was in charge of the BBC's coverage of the 2012 Olympics, which won several awards, including from the Royal Television Society.

In May 2013, Mosey was appointed editorial director of the BBC, but the appointment was short-lived; he retired from the BBC in August that year. Upon leaving the BBC, Mosey wrote in The Times that the BBC was insufficiently open to divergent viewpoints and had failed to "give enough space to anti-immigration views or to EU-withdrawalists". He proposed that the organisation should share the licence fee with others. His years at the BBC are the subject of his memoir published in 2015, Getting Out Alive, and in 2022 he published 20 Things that would make the News better.

In 2013, Mosey was elected to succeed Richard Bowring as Master of Selwyn College, Cambridge. His election was announced on 2 July and he took up the role in October 2013 and served as Master for 12 years until September 2025, when he was succeeded by Suzanne Raine.

Also in 2013 it was announced that he would be Chair of Bishop Grosseteste University's university council.

== Honours ==
Mosey has been awarded honorary degrees by the University of Lincoln (Doctor of Letters, 2011) and the University of Bradford (Doctor, 2013).

== Personal life ==
In 2026, Mosey wrote an article in the Daily Telegraph revealing that he was adopted, having been born to a single mother in a Mother and Baby Home in Cheshire.

His interests include football (he is an Arsenal fan), films, and reading thrillers and political biographies.

== Publications ==
- Getting Out Alive – News, Sport & Politics at the BBC, Biteback (2015); ISBN 978-1-84954-831-1
- 20 Things that would make the News better, Biteback (2022); ISBN 978-1-78590-755-5

Media offices
Preceded by Phil Harding	Editor of Today; 1993–1997	Succeeded by Rod Liddle
Academic offices
Preceded by Richard Bowring	Master of Selwyn College, Cambridge; 2013–2025	Succeeded by Suzanne Raine
