= Selwyn College Library =

Library of Selwyn College, Cambridge

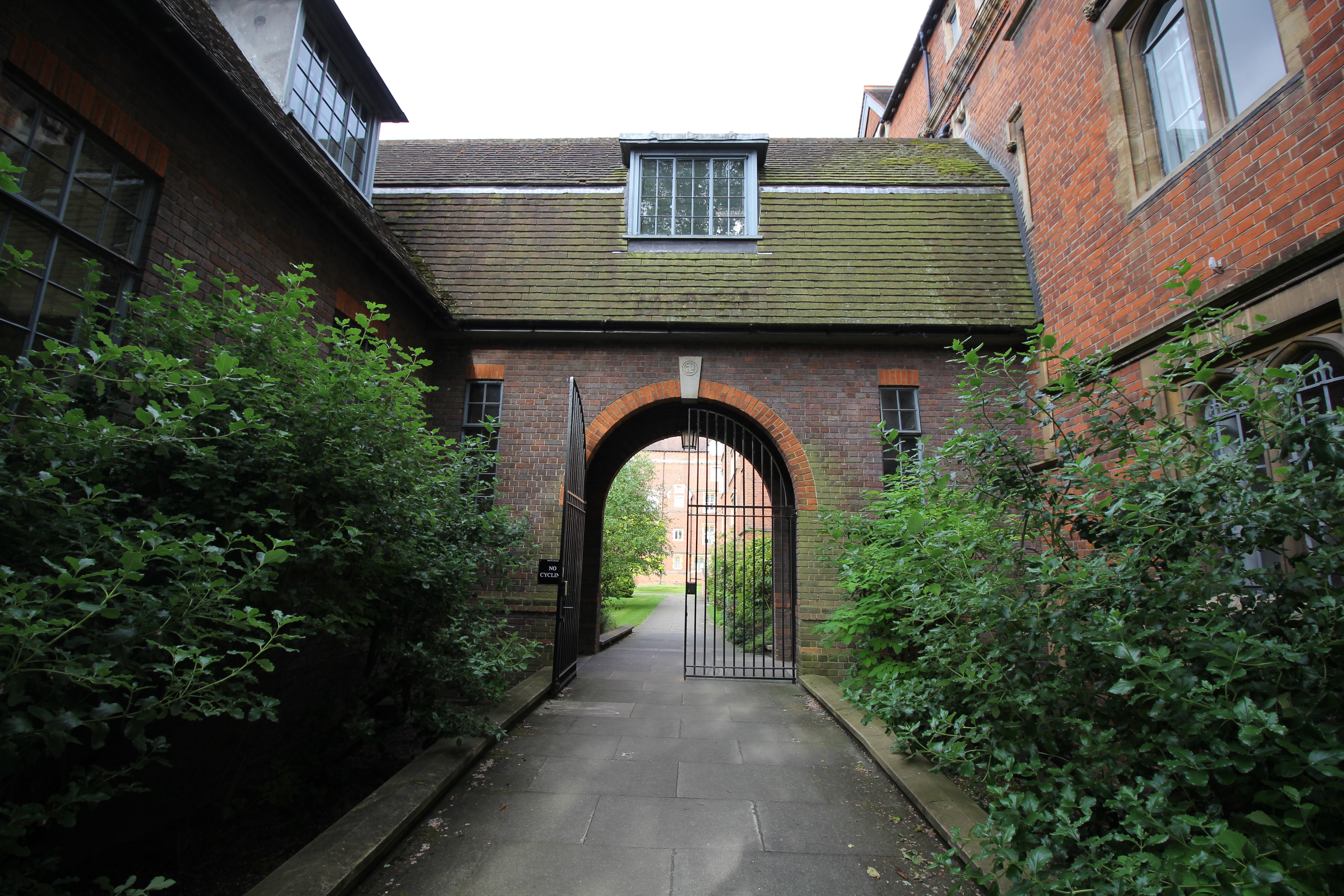

- Location within Cambridgeshire

General information
- Type: Library
- Architectural style: Victorian
- Location: 39 Grange Road; Cambridge, Cambridgeshire; United Kingdom
- Coordinates: 52.2014°N 0.1037°E
- Completed: 1929
- Owner: Selwyn College, Cambridge; University of Cambridge

Technical details
- Floor count: 2
- Floor area: 8,600 square feet (800 m^{2})

Design and construction
- Architect: T.H. Lyon

The Selwyn College Library is the library of Selwyn College, Cambridge and an official collegiate library of the University of Cambridge. The current library building is located in Centre Court and was completed in 1929. It was designed by the architect T. H. Lyon as a war memorial library to honour the fallen from the First World War. In 2018, plans for a new library and auditorium in Ann's Court were announced. The current Selwyn College Head Librarian is Sonya Adams and the College Archivist is Elizabeth Stratton.

The new Bartlam Library officially opened in Easter Term 2021 in Ann’s Court, replacing the War Memorial Library as the main library facility for the college. Named after principal benefactor Tom Bartlam (SE 1966), the three-storey building includes study areas, book stacks, seminar rooms, and a basement level. It adjoins the Quarry Whitehouse Auditorium, a 139-seat space for lectures and events, with retractable seating and adaptable layouts. Approximately 35,000 books were moved into the Bartlam Library in July 2021, while rare and older materials were placed in storage during refurbishment of the old library building. Following the opening of the new library, the original War Memorial Library was converted into teaching, tutorial, and conference spaces as part of Selwyn’s redevelopment programme.

== Description ==
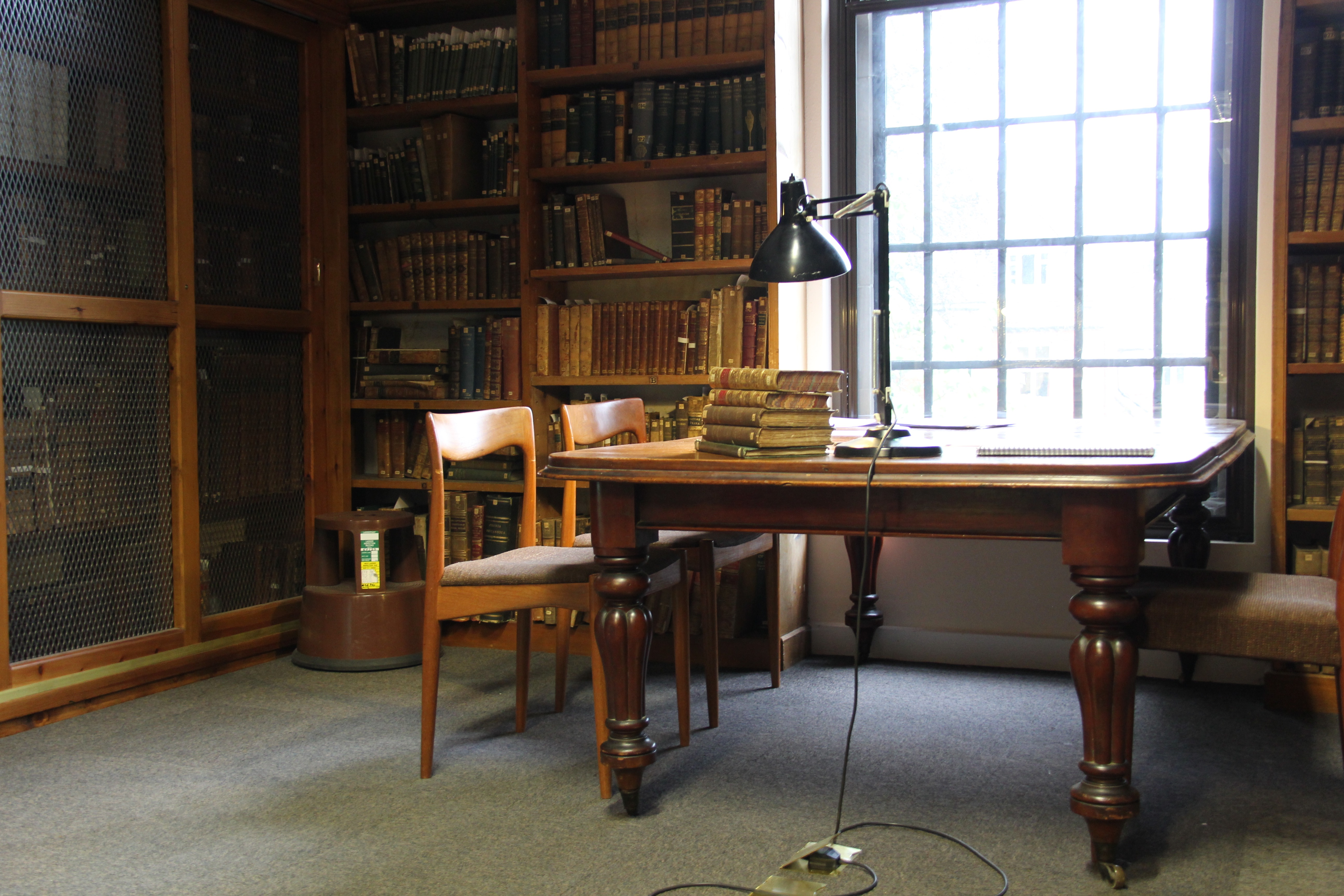
Selwyn College Library Table

The original Selwyn College Library is a two-level Victorian stone and brick building. The ground floor consists of wooden library stacks, sofas, tables, washroom facilities, and librarians offices; the floor above consists of a quiet-study area, computer stations, and rare book collections.

A small modern Annx which provides addition space for book stacks and work tables is connected to the back of the War Memorial library via a small ground-level passageway. The War Memorial Library also includes an elevated bridge which connects it to C-Staircase and Old Court. Underneath this elevated bridge, and arch with two metal gates serve as the gateway to Centre Court. The library is equipped with computers, printers, binding machines, and book easels for students' convenience. The library can be accessed from Centre Court by key or special appointment. Special historical exhibits and curated book collections are often displayed on the main table for general interest.

== History ==
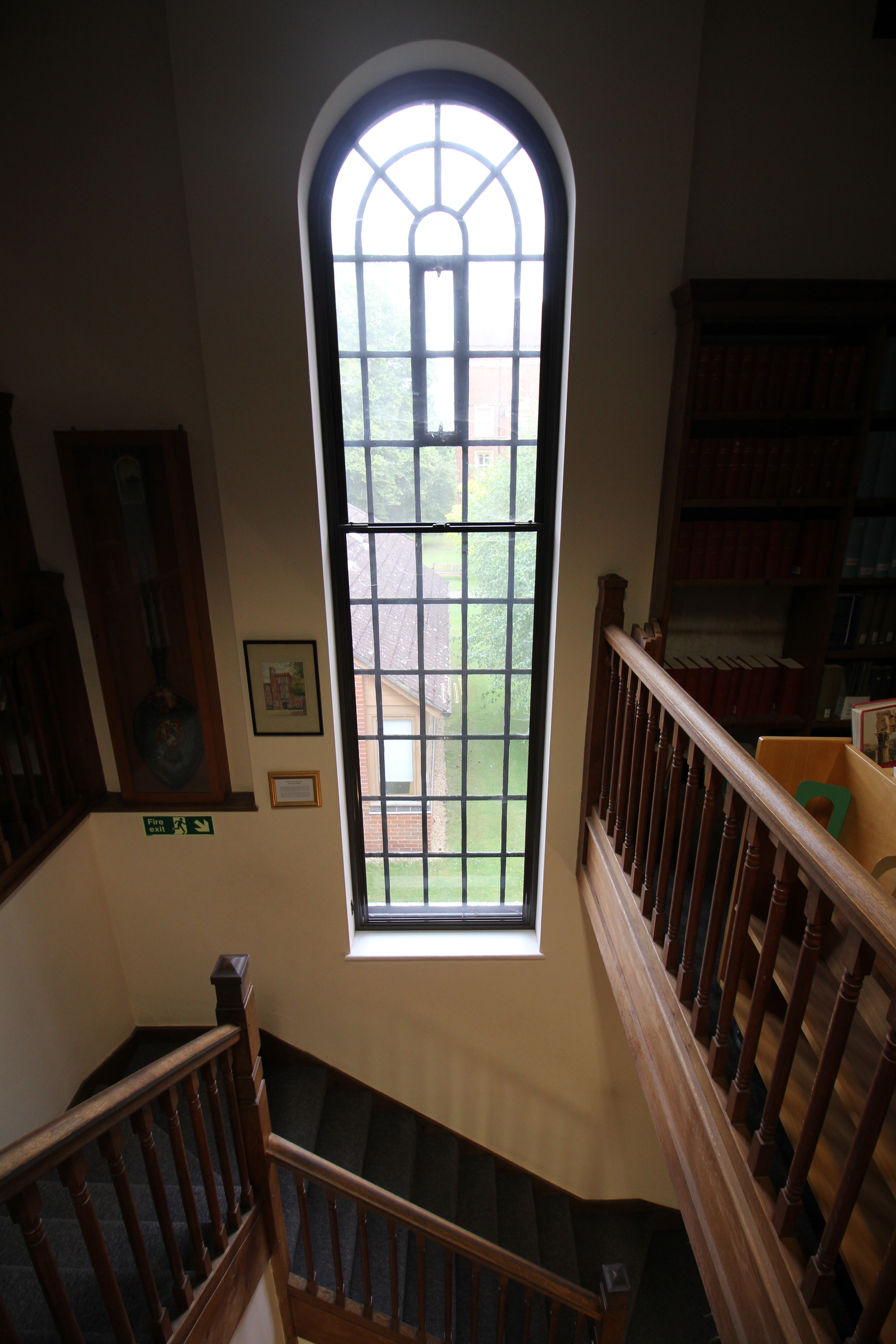
War Memorial Library (Staircase)

The Selwyn College Library has been housed in several different locations since the foundation of the College in 1882. The first library was housed in the Tower Room above the Gatehouse which was one of the first parts of the college completed in 1882. By 1895, the Selwyn College Library was moved to the old, temporary chapel inside of the first court. Students had to study by oil lamp, while dons had gas lighting; electricity was not installed in the college until 1923.

In 1929, the Selwyn College library moved yet again, but this time to a purpose built location on the outer side of C Staircase. This new building, the War Memorial Library, was constructed in memory of the First World War and was large enough to absorb the burgeoning collection of books and letters which had been acquired by the college.

=== Growth ===
The Selwyn College Library received two significant benefactions during the 19th century. The first came from Canon William Cooke in 1894, and the second from Edward Wheatley-Balme in 1896. In addition to providing general use textbooks and common print materials, these two collections included several rare books and documents which helped the library grow and develop in this early stage. In 1913, A. C. Benson the Master of Magdalene College, Cambridge, donated a letter from the famous seventeenth century diarist, Samuel Pepys, to Selwyn College. These and other books and letters are kept in the rare books collections. As late as 1914, the Selwyn College Library received an annual grant of £20 to acquire new books and materials. The library contains more than 30,000 books and publications, along with computers and online subscriptions to academic journals and magazines.

=== War Memorial Library ===
During the First World War, enrollment at Selwyn College declined and nurses from the Eastern General Hospital (which would later become the site of the Cambridge University Library) were housed in Selwyn College staircases. The main College court was converted to use as an allotment to grow vegetables for the war effort and only very limited funds were available to expand the library.

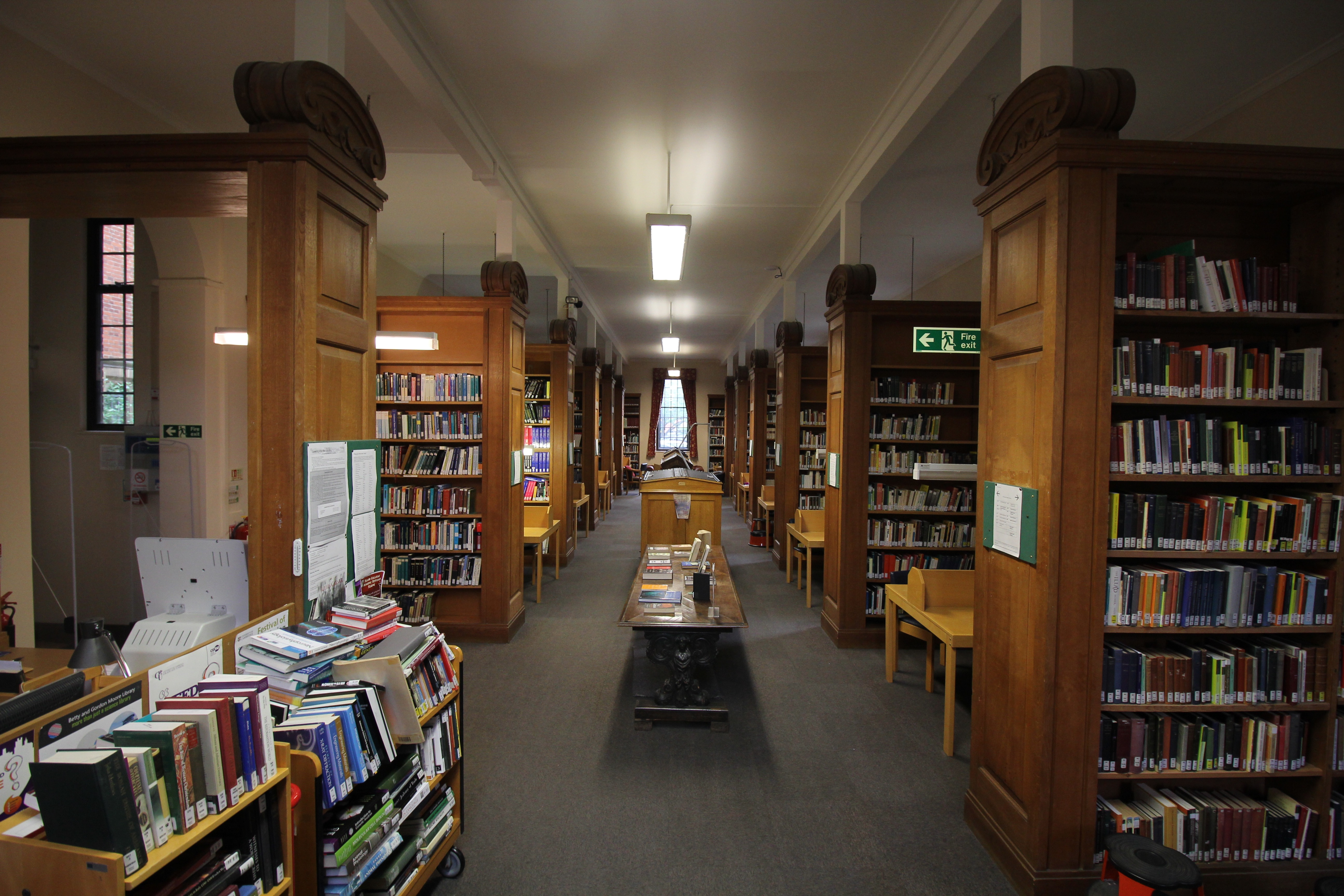
Selwyn College Library

Following the war, the college endeavoured to remember those who had fallen. When asked what form this memorial should take, students strongly favoured a new War Memorial Library. Plans for a new library which would have closed in the gap between Chapel and F-Staircase were drawn up by the architect T. H. Lyon, but were ultimately rejected. The same architect was then hired to design the current Victorian stone and red-brick structure which stands in today's Centre Court. The War Memorial Library was completed in 1929. The funds to build the small bridge connecting the upper floor of the War Memorial Library with C staircase were given by two Japanese noblemen, in gratitude for the hospitality they had received at the Master's Lodge while staying in Cambridge. The 'swastika' symbol located above the arch on the west side of the library bridge has confused many students but is in fact the cognizance of the family of one of the benefactors, the Marquis Tokugawa.

== Archives ==
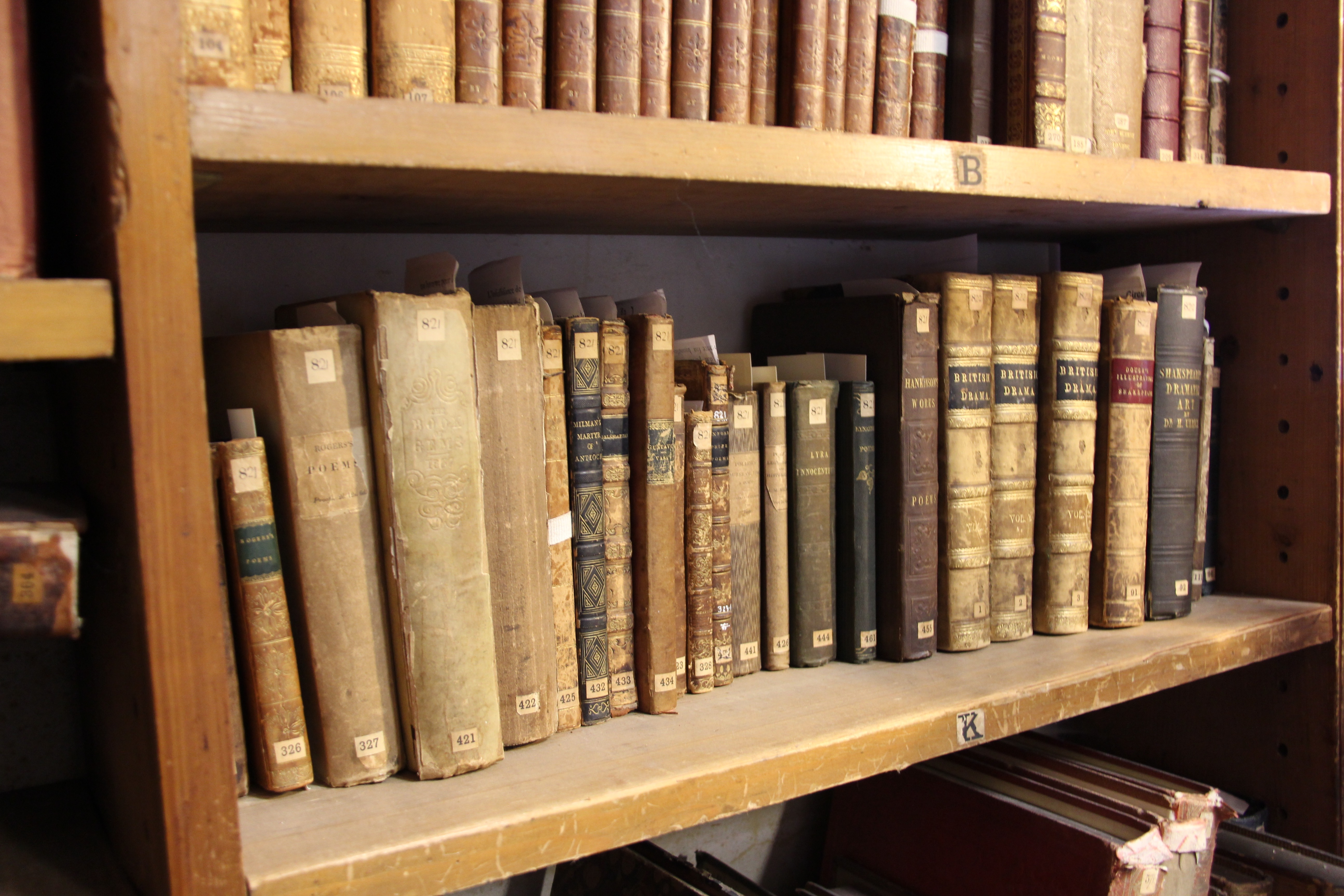
Selwyn College Book Collections

The Selwyn College Archives are the main record repository of Selwyn College, Cambridge. The archives aim to collect, preserve, and make available the records which document the history and development of the College. The archives include significant letters and documents from George Augustus Selwyn (1809–78), the Bishop of New Zealand. In addition, the archives include documents, letters, and plans from alumni and masters of the college since the 19th century. Contributions of Cambridge letters, photos and memorabilia from alumni and families associated with Selwyn College ensure that the archives continue to grow. The Archives Centre regularly highlights and promotes these documents through historical displays and exhibits in the Selwyn College Library.

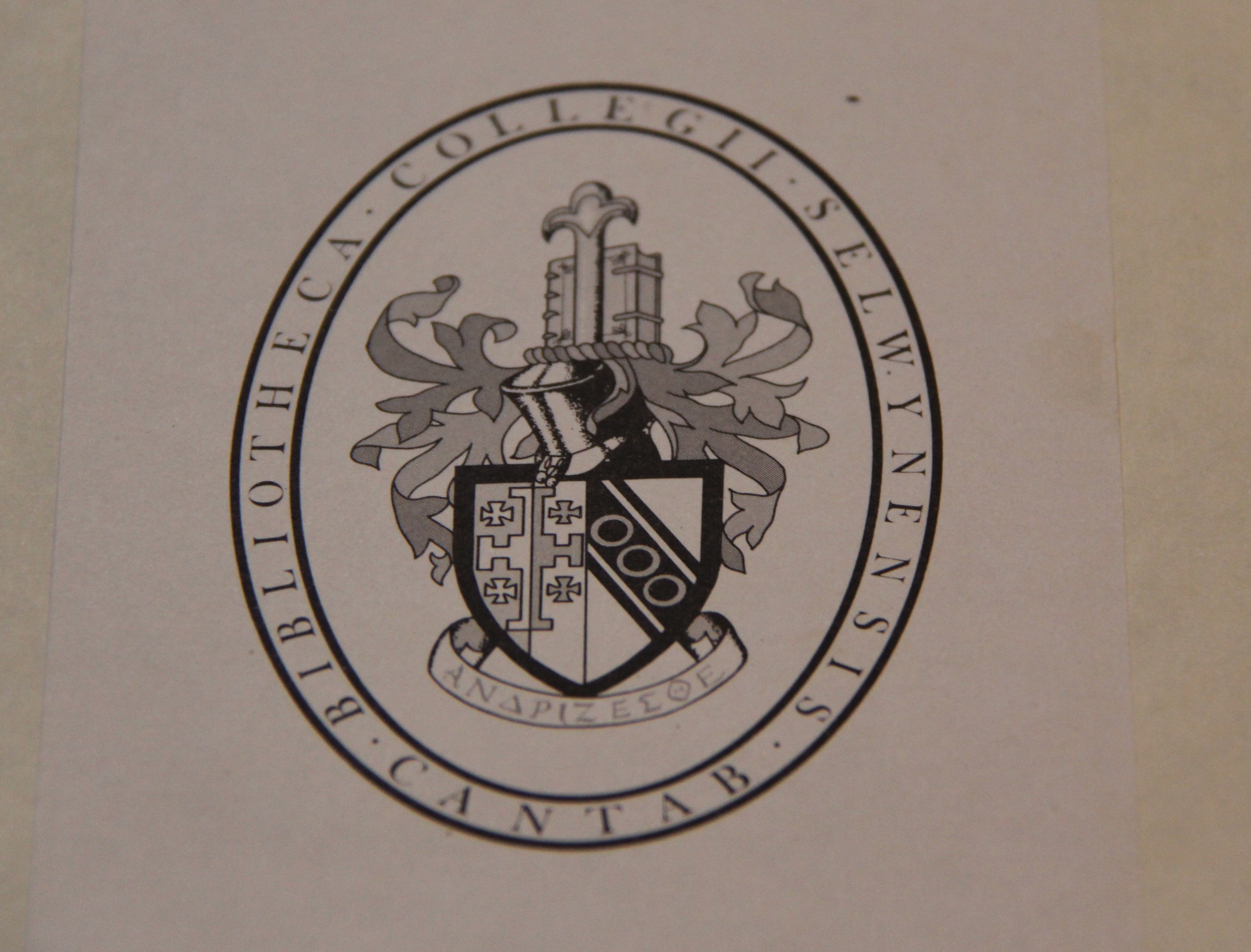
Bibliotheca Collegii Selwynensis, Cantab

In 2016, a hidden trove of letters, photographs, and rare postcards belonging to a Victorian servant were discovered behind the wooden paneling of a Victorian gyp, a small kitchen originally used by college servants. The artefacts from this discovery were preserved, documented, and deposited in the Selwyn College archives.

Many of the collections held by the College Archives are available for consultation by students and researchers, without charge, provided an appointment has been booked with the Archivist prior to visiting. Visitors to the Archives are required to provide one form of photographic identification and one other form of government-issued identification. The Archives examination room has electric power points for laptops. Only pencils are permitted for handwritten notes. Eating or drinking in the archives is not permitted.

== Bartlam Library ==
Announced in 2018 and completed October 20, 2021, this 13 million pound project, constructed along the western edge of Ann's Court effectively enclosed the court. It was designed by Porphyrios Associates and Barnes Construction, and is built in the same historical style and vernacular as Ann's Court so as to not clash with the college's existing architectural style. The library includes a new archives centre and auditorium. In total, the Bartlam Library consists of three floors, a sub-basement, and a tower overlooking west Cambridge. It includes world-leading computer facilities, along with significantly more room for students and researches.

Bartlam Library is considerably larger than the old War Memorial Library and includes the Quarry Whitehouse Auditorium, a 139-seat auditorium for teaching, examinations, and public lectures such as the Ramsay Murray lecture series. The auditorium seating is retractable and some walls are moveable to allow for different configurations and uses of the space. It is also designed to allow for in-person and online events. During vacations and breaks, the auditorium space serves as part of the college's conference facilities.

== Redevelopment ==
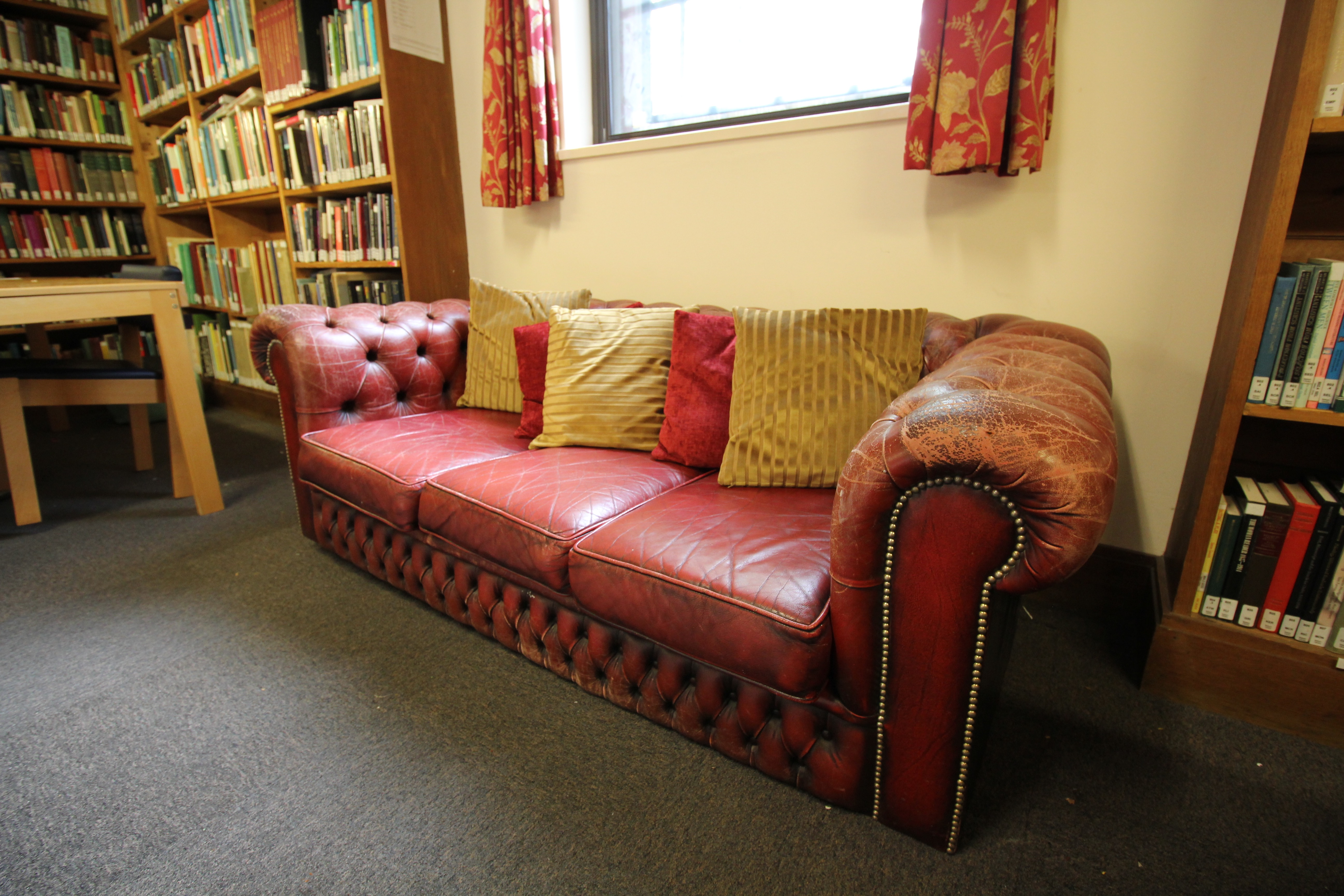
Chesterfield Sofa in Selwyn College Library

A further £1.5 million redevelopment project will ensure that the historic War Memorial Library and adjoining bridge will be retained and preserved. Once the New Library in Ann's Court is completed, the old Library in Centre Court will be renovated and converted into seven teaching, tutorial, and conference spaces. The earliest that work will start on the old library redevelopment is 2020.

While the College's future development plan calls for a wing of staircases to eventually be built along the western edge of Centre Court (facing Grange Road), the old library will be retained for its character and historic significance to the college's early development. As such, the future development of this accommodation wing will work around the existing War Memorial Library to ensure its long-term future, while also provided expanded student living facilities.
