= George Newsom =

British clergyman and academic (1871–1934)

The Rev. George Ernest Newsom (24 May 1871 – 15 February 1934) was an Anglican clergyman and academic, Master of Selwyn College, Cambridge, 1928–1934, and Chaplain to the King (George V). He was also Professor of Pastoral Theology at King's College, London, 1903–1917, and Vice-Principal of King's College, London, 1897–1903.

Newsom is buried in the Parish of the Ascension Burial Ground in Cambridge.
