= John Owen Farquhar Murray =

The Rev. John Owen Farquhar Murray (6 May 1858 – 29 November 1944) was an Anglican clergyman, and Master of Selwyn College, Cambridge from 1909 to 1928.

== Biography ==
Murray was a son of Surgeon-General John Murray. He married at St. Michael′s church, Cambridge, on 9 December 1902 to Frances Margaret Somerset, daughter of Rev. R. B. Somerset.

He was in 1902 Examining chaplain to the Bishop of Ely (Lord Alwyne Compton), and a dean of Emmanuel College, Cambridge.
