= Oxford Poetry =

- Editor: Luke Allan
- Former editors: Aldous Huxley (1916); Dorothy Sayers (1917–18); Siegfried Sassoon (1919); Robert Graves (1921); Harold Acton (1924); W. H. Auden (1927); W. H. Auden, Cecil Day-Lewis (1927); Louis MacNeice, Stephen Spender (1929); Kingsley Amis (1949); Donald Hall, Geoffrey Hill (1953); Anthony Thwaite (1954); Adrian Mitchell (1955); John Fuller (1960)
- Categories: Poetry
- Frequency: Twice a year
- Circulation: 2,000
- Publisher: Partus Press
- First issue: 1910
- Country: United Kingdom
- Based in: Oxford, England
- Language: English
- Website: http://www.oxfordpoetry.com/
- ISSN: 1465-6213

Oxford Poetry is a literary magazine based in Oxford, England. It is currently edited by Luke Allan. The magazine is published by Partus Press.

Founded in 1910 by Basil Blackwell, its editors have included Dorothy L. Sayers, Aldous Huxley, Robert Graves, Vera Brittain, Kingsley Amis, Anthony Thwaite, John Fuller and Bernard O'Donoghue.

Among the authors to have appeared in Oxford Poetry are Fleur Adcock, A. Alvarez, W. H. Auden, Anne Carson, Nevill Coghill, David Constantine, Robert Crawford, Carol Ann Duffy, Elaine Feinstein, Graham Greene, Seamus Heaney, W. N. Herbert, Geoffrey Hill, Christopher Isherwood, Elizabeth Jennings, Jenny Joseph, Stephen Knight, Ronald Knox, Philip Larkin, Cecil Day-Lewis, Michael Longley, Louis MacNeice, Peter McDonald, Christopher Middleton, Andrew Motion, Paul Muldoon, Tom Paulin, Mario Petrucci, Craig Raine, Jo Shapcott, Stephen Spender, George Szirtes, J. R. R. Tolkien, Susan Wicks and Charles Wright.

As well as publishing two issues per year, the magazine hosts the annual Oxford Poetry Prize. The 2022 Prize was judged by Emily Berry. First prize was won by Dominic Leonard, second prize by Linda Ravenswood, and third prize by Caleb Leow. The 2023 edition of the Prize was judged by Will Harris. First prize was won by Miruna Fulgeanu, second prize by Jo Davis, and third prize by Eric Yip. Before the inauguration of the Oxford Poetry Prize in 2022, the magazine traditionally published the winners of Oxford's Newdigate Prize.

== Editors of Oxford Poetry ==
=== Until the Second World War ===
- 1910–13: G. D. H. Cole, Geoffrey Dennis, Sherard Vines
- 1914: G. D. H. Cole, Sherard Vines
- 1915: G. D. H. Cole, T. W. Earp
- 1916: Wilfred Rowland Childe, T. W. Earp, Aldous Huxley
- 1917: Wilfred Rowland Childe, T. W. Earp, Dorothy L. Sayers
- 1918: T. W. Earp, E. F. A. Geach, Dorothy L. Sayers
- 1919: T. W. Earp, Dorothy L. Sayers, Siegfried Sassoon
- 1920: Vera Brittain, C. H. B. Kitchin, Alan Porter
- 1921: Alan Porter, Richard Hughes, Robert Graves
- 1922: No editors cited.
- 1923: David Cleghorn Thomson, F. W. Bateson
- 1924: Harold Acton, Peter Quennell
- 1925: Patrick Monkhouse, Charles Plumb
- 1926: Charles Plumb, W. H. Auden
- 1927: W. H. Auden, C. Day-Lewis
- 1928: Clere Parsons, Basil Blackwell
- 1929: Louis MacNeice, Stephen Spender
- 1930: Stephen Spender, Bernard Spencer
- 1931: Bernard Spencer, Richard Goodman
- 1932: Richard Goodman
- 1933–5: No editions.
- 1936: A. W. Sandford, Alan Rook
- 1937: Nevill Coghill, Alistair Sandford
- 1938–41: No editions.
- 1942–3: Ian Davie, John Heath-Stubbs
- 1944–5: No editions

=== Post-War ===
- 1946: Roy Macnab, Gordon Swaine
- 1947: Martin Starkie, Roy Macnab
- 1948: Arthur Boyars, Barry Harmer
- 1949: Kingsley Amis, James Michie
- 1950: J. B. Donne, Donald Watt
- 1951: J. B. Donne, Martin Seymour-Smith
- 1952: Derwent May, James Price
- 1953: Donald Hall, Geoffrey Hill
- 1954: Jonathan Price, Anthony Thwaite
- 1955: Adrian Mitchell, Richard Selig
- 1956: Bernard Donoughue, Gabriel Pearson
- 1957: Peter Ferguson, Dennis Keene
- 1958:. Roger Lonsdale, Judy Spink
- 1960:. John Fuller, Francis Hope
- 1961–9: No editions.
- 1970: Mark Wormald, Robin Leanse

=== Oxford Poetry re-launched ===
- June 1983: Mick Imlah, Nicholas Jenkins, Elise Paschen, Nicola Richards
- Autumn 1983: Nicholas Jenkins, Elise Paschen, Nicola Richards
- 1984–5: Nicholas Jenkins, Bernard O'Donoghue, Peter McDonald, Elise Paschen
- Winter 1986: Mark Ford, Nicholas Jenkins, John Lanchester, Elise Paschen
- Summer 1987: Mark Ford, Elise Paschen, Mark Wormald
- Winter 1987: Elise Paschen, Mark Wormald
- 1988: Mark Wormald, Sarah Dence, Bernard O'Donoghue, Janice Whitten
- 1989–91: Mark Wormald
- Summer 1992: Sinéad Garrigan, Kate Reeves, Mark Wormald
- Winter 1992: Sinéad Garrigan, Kate Reeves
- Summer 1993: Sinéad Garrigan, Kate Reeves, Ian Samson
- Winter 1993: Sinéad Garrigan, Ian Samson
- Summer 1994: Sinéad Garrigan, Ian Samson
- Winter 1994. Sinéad Garrigan, Sam Leith
- 1995: Sinéad Garrigan, Sam Leith
- 1996–7: No editions.
- Easter 1998: Graham Nelson, Gillian Pachter, Robert Macfarlane
- Winter 1998: Graham Nelson, Robert Macfarlane
- 1999: Graham Nelson, Jane Griffiths
- 2000: Graham Nelson, Jane Griffiths, Jenni Nuttall

=== 21st century ===
- 2003: Carmen Bugan, Kelly Grovier, Sarah Hesketh
- 2004: Carmen Bugan, Kelly Grovier, Sinéad Sturgeon
- 2006: Carmen Bugan, Kelly Grovier, Richard Rowley, Sinéad Sturgeon
- 2007: Paul Thomas Abbott
- 2008: Benjamin Mullen, J. C. H. Potts
- 2009–2011: Hamid Khanbhai, Thomas A. Richards
- 2012–2014: Lavinia Singer, Aime Williams
- 2015–2016: Mika Ross-Southall, Lavinia Singer, Andrew Wynn Owen
- 2017: Nancy Campbell, Mary Jean Chan, Theophilus Kwek
- 2018–2020: Mary Jean Chan, Theophilus Kwek, Jay Bernard, Luke Allan
- 2021–: Luke Allan

== See also ==
- The Oxford Magazine
