= Selective =

Selective may refer to:

- Selective school, a school that admits students on the basis of some sort of selection criteria
  - Selective school (New South Wales)

== See also ==
- Selective breeding, the process of breeding for specific traits
- Selection (disambiguation)
- Selectivity (disambiguation)
