= Kaiserwald concentration camp =

Nazi concentration camp in Latvia

Coordinates: 56°59′49″N 24°07′53″E

Kaiserwald
- Concentration camp
- Image of the camp after 1945
- Other names: Ķeizarmežs
- Operated by: Nazi Germany
- Commandant: Albert Sauer
- Operational: March 1943 – 15 October 1944
- Number of inmates: 11,878, almost all Jews
- Liberated by: Red Army

Kaiserwald (Ķeizarmežs, Mežaparks, Kaizervalde) was a Nazi concentration camp situated in the Sarkandaugava and Mežaparks neighborhoods of Riga, the capital of Latvia. It originally served the function of a collective assembly point distributing Jewish labourers for the German Army to a number of surrounding satellite workcamps. When the SS took command they transformed Kaiserwald into a concentration camp with approval from Reichskommissariat Ostland. At its highpoint the camp had 12,000 Jewish enforced labourers. 50% of these were women. Most were German Jews, but a notable minority were survivors from the liquidated Jewish communities of Vilnius and Kaunas in neighbouring Lithuania.

Kaiserwald was established by the SS in March 1943 during a time when the war began to turn against the Germans. On 21 June RFSS Heinrich Himmler issued a command in which he insisted upon an acceleration of the 'Final Solution.' Jews were to be 'cleared' from all the Ghettos with the able bodied being sent to concentration camps and the unfit, elderly and children being earmarked for liquidation.

This turn around in events was to a huge disadvantage to the German Army that had previously been responsible for Jews in Riga. The Jews had been working in satellite camps producing wares and textiles for the Army. The families of the labourers were quartered in the Riga Ghetto. This, too, had come under the authority of the German Army. The labourers were awarded the rites of passage. They could pass in and out of the Ghetto to their places of work. At the end of the working day they could return to their families. This degree of moderation came brutally to an end when the SS took over. The first inmates of the camp were several hundred convicts from Germany.

== The liquidation of the ghettos ==
In conformity with Himmler's decree the liquidation of the Riga Ghetto was to be carried out along with that of the Liepāja and Daugavpils (Dvinsk) ghettos. The operation began in June 1943. There hadn't been such an example of radicalization since the summer of 1941. Latvia, for instance, had had a pre-war Jewish population of 70,000, the majority of which, however, was murdered by the employment of Einsatzgruppe A. Even the German Army had been implicated in this crime. After a period of relative stability throughout 1942 Himmler raised the stakes again in early mid-1943 in his determination to radicalize the 'Final Solution.'

As a result, the period of relative consolidation in the Ghettos throughout Latvia and neighbouring Lithuania, whereby even some cultural activities alongside enforced labour occurred, came to an abrupt end in early mid-1943. The Ghettos, including that of Riga, were earmarked for destruction.

The elderly, the unfit and children were to be shot. The able-bodied, both male and female and some juveniles would be sent to Kaiserwald Concentration Camp while the remainder of the Jews surviving the liquidation of the Vilna Ghetto would be deported to Kaiserwald.

The Riga Ghetto consisted of 8,000 Jews. Although conditions under the German Army had been marginally better than to be expected under the SS there was at least the opportunity for the labourers to be with their families after a day's work. The rites of passage and the intermingling of Life between the satellite workcamps and the Ghetto were to receive a rude awakening.

The SS began their operation in June 1943. Himmler placed his most able SS-general Bach-Zelewski to coordinate measures and to redirect all able-bodied Jewish male and female labourers from the satellite camps to be incarcerated in Kaiserwald. He was to do this by any means at his disposal, but the complexity of the satellite camp system run by the Army and the uneven distribution of Jewish workers meant the SS couldn't be as quick as their motives intended.

The operation in Riga lasted some months for the SS had to employ deception techniques to entice the returning labourers from the satellite camps that nothing would happen to their families in the Ghetto. In neighbouring Lithuania in the Ghettos of Vilnius (or Vilna) and Kaunas it was far easier for the SS to extinguish the Jewish communities there. As these were already located within the perimeter of an enclosed Ghetto the SS with the help of the Lithuanian auxiliary police ('Hilfspolizei') could deal with the Ghetto population in one fell swoop.

Amidst grotesque manipulation and false promises the events in Vilna took a terrible course. Most of the Ghetto inhabitants if they hadn't died from illness and disease already were placed on LKW trucks, often provided by the German Army, and taken to Ponary (in Lithuanian: Paneriai) where they were massacred. The corpses were left in mass graves. A Jewish Arbeitskommando had to burn some of the bodies on burning pyres before disposing of the remains. An estimated 70,000-100,000 Jews from the Vilna Ghetto perished in this way.

A few thousand able-bodied survivors from the Vilna Ghetto were transported to Kaiserwald. In keeping with Himmler's outlook the SS brought all the surviving Jews from all the extinguished Ghettos to the Kaiserwald Concentration Camp. The pattern of destruction that affected Vilna touched Kaunas, Liepāja and Dvinsk and other Ghettos. There was nothing left of the Ghetto communities.

Even Białystok in north-eastern Poland, renowned for producing wares and textiles for the German Army, was liquidated with most of its Ghetto Community being gassed in Treblinka. All this was in keeping with the radicalised momentum of the 'Final Solution.' Himmler's intention, following the liquidation of all the Ghettos, was to have the surviving able-bodied Jews gradually undermined and destroyed through another murderous concept. In place of Ghettoization there was to be Vernichtung durch Arbeit ('Extermination through Work').

== Inhumane work conditions ==
Josef Katz, a Jew deported from Lübeck to Riga in December 1941 along with his family relatives and others of the Jewish community, noted the changes he was exposed to. At first he was engaged with other Jews in farm work seeing to the growing and harvesting of root crops. Another of his duties was unloading the barges along the banks of the river Düna upon which Riga lies. The work was strenuous but manageable and remained under the jurisdiction of the German Army.

It was rumoured how Himmler never wanted to see Jews settled in Riga. The SS had previously no interest in establishing either a Ghetto or a concentration camp there. The initiative to employ the Jews fell to the Army. It was felt by the High Command (OKW) that Jews could be more usefully employed working in textiles, wares and agriculture. This, it was argued would ease the Army's logistical problems and its need for warm winter clothing.

Katz was like his fellows employed in either agriculture or down by the river estuary. The flexibility of the type of enforced labour he undertook indicated how the Jews had a manageable although at times strenuous existence. Life under the authority of the Army was comparatively better than what one heard about regarding the brutalization of the Ghettos elsewhere by the SS and their auxiliaries.

When the survivors of the Vilna Ghetto were crammed into the Riga Ghetto it was clear how more rumours and descriptions of the truth were in abundance to compete with one another. Katz didn't know what to believe but over the course of early and mid-1943 it was clear how operational advantage had slipped into the hands of the SS. They outbidded the authority of the Army so that directives from the WVHA and RSHA in Berlin determined the new course. The Army conceded. Enforced labourers like Katz were coerced into taking up new 'residence' in the conveniently positioned assembly area in Mežaparks that began to take the form of a concentration camp.

The satellite camps became closed and fewer while the main body of workers was located within Kaiserwald. This new concentration camp had all the hallmarks of the concentration camp system. Barbed wire was erected, watch towers took their place, prisoners themselves built more barracks to house the influx of more enforced labourers. Men and women were separated. Prisoners had their hair shaved off and had to wear a striped pyjama uniform and wear wooden cloggs. There were more roll-calls on the main assembly area ('Appelleplatz' in German). A nightmare scenario descended. For the Jews of Riga it must have seemed like the beginning of the end.

Not only was there evidence of grotesque dehumanization but there was also excessive barbarity that began with the extinguishing of the Riga Ghetto while the Army stood aside or even helped with the logistics of murder. That was the tragedy of the Ghetto. It was something Katz couldn't believe.

After the Ghetto's liquidation the surviving Jews had to endure the concentration camp. For other Jews like Ingeborg Gerson-Brin (1922-2012), a young woman detailed to work in the camp each day became an endurance test. On account of the camp's strict segregation she was separated from her husband Max Brin (*1924-) who was requisitioned for heavy labour. At least they had been able to be together in the Ghetto but this was no longer possible after the latter's dissolution.

It was mainly young people that were quartered in Kaiserwald Concentration Camp. Among them, for instance, were Ingeborg Gerson-Brin aged 22, Max Brin aged 23, Eugen Borkum aged 34. Some middle-aged tried to pass themselves off as able-bodied, but the work regime was tough for them as it was for Max Brin's father, 50 year old Micha Brin.

The elderly, however, together with the lame and sick and all the children, barring a few juveniles who reported for adult work, were taken from the Ghetto and placed on LKW trucks to a secluded place outside of Riga where they were shot. Their bodies were cast into mass graves. It was like a repetition of the events that had characterized the massacre at Ponary.

== New arrivals ==
On 19 March 1944 Germany occupied Hungary, a country that had mostly avoided the perils of the 'Final Solution.' Since the Regency-government under Admiral Miklós Horthy de Nagybánya refused to accelerate anti-Semitic measures against the Hungarian Jewish population, the Germans took over and imposed a collaborationist regime led by the Hungarian fascist Döme Sztójay. What followed was an agonizing tragedy as Hungary's 500, 000 Jews became victims of the 'Final Solution.'

A few thousand Hungarian Jews found themselves being transported to Riga where they became inmates of Kaiserwald Concentration Camp. As some of the smaller satellite camps were still in existence some of them were sent there to work. It was mostly able bodied male and female labourers that made up the punishing work details in compliance with Himmler's directive of Vernichtung durch Arbeit ('Extermination through Work').

As the war turned increasingly against Germany with the growing threat of the Red Army in the East Himmler was of the opinion that Jews even though destined to be destroyed could be put to use building valuable defence fortifications for the Reich. In this way Ingeborg Gerson-Brin recalls having to dig fortifications more than 1 metre deep. Often the women had to undertake arduous work expected of males. With the meagre rations (barely a litre of undesirable watery cabbage and potato soup) it was difficult to muster up the physical energy to survive.

Some of the enforced labourers in their shabby pyjama uniforms, with wooden cloggs and shaved hair had to work in some of the still existing smaller satellite camps around Riga which were brought under the jurisdiction of the Kaiserwald camp. The army in the meantime had its role thoroughly diminished, although under the radicalized climate of the times they weren't immune to participating in war crimes themselves and often provided the transportation to assist in the murder of Jews.

How Hungarian Jews found their way to Kaiserwald belongs to one of the mysteries of the 'Final Solution.' Although directives came from the centre of authority in Berlin, via the RSHA and WVHA, local initiatives were taken by subordinates and regional commanders so that the distribution of Jews was sometimes haphazard and with coordination left askew so that certain transports were sent in unexpected directions.

The Hungarian Jews arrived in Kaiserwald as part of a mixed bag of arrivals, some of whom were a number of Jews from Łódź in Poland, one of the last working and operative Ghettos; one specialising in the manufacture of wares and textiles for the German war economy.

With all the mixed bag of arrivals the total number of Jews in Kaiserwald Concentration Camp added up to 11,878; a figure allowing for their distribution throughout the main camp ('Stammlager') and its subsidiaries ('Außenlager'). By March 1944, 6,182 males and 5,696 females were registered. Only 95 were gentiles. The unique ratio between men and women in Kaiserwald may be partly explained through the deporting of women from the Lodz Ghetto who arrived to make up for female numbers while the number of males as a result of the backbreaking hard labour diminished in accordance with Himmler's dictum of Vernichtung durch Arbeit ('Extermination through Work').

== Workforce & production ==
Unlike Auschwitz or Treblinka, Kaiserwald was not an extermination camp. It had all the hallmarks of a labour camp and just as the German Army had originally intended, the camp inmates were put to good use integrating into the demands of the German war economy.

As a result, the concentration camp workforce were put to work by large German companies, notably Allgemeine Elektrizitäts-Gesellschaft. These used a large number of female slaves within the Kaiserwald camp-complex. Their expertise in assembly-line production profited from their experience and knowledge gathered by those among them who had previously been put to work in the Lodz Ghetto.

The women of Kaiserwald like those of Ingeborg Gerson-Brin (1922-2012) worked in the production of electrical goods, such as batteries. These were required for German Army purposes as well as for the Home Front. However, there was no guarantee of secure employment since the nucleus of established workers could be at any time replaced by a whole new Transport of new arrivals. Hence, survival chances were sometimes slim. 'Selections' continued and an atmosphere of distrust and oppression prevailed.

== Evacuation ==
As the Red Army further advanced its leading columns entered Latvia on 5 August 1944. This threw the Germans into a panic. Similar to the situation that had been encountered by the Vaivara Concentration Camp in Estonia there weren't enough ships to evacuate the prisoners. The intention was to ship the labour force of Kaiserwald to Stutthof concentration camp where the workforce could be relocated near Danzig in Poland.

== Witness-account ==
As the Red Army advanced closer to Riga in the summer of 1944 a few thousand or so young women from Kaiserwald Concentration Camp were crammed into the hulk of a large troop ship bound for Stutthof. Among them was Ingeborg Gerson-Brin (1922-2012).

The women were parted from the male prisoners just as they boarded the ship. In this way she lost touch with her husband Max as well as her father-law Micha Brin and a good close friend, the artist Eugen Borkum (*1911-) whom she never saw again.

What happened to many of the males from Kaiserwald must have worried her for as her party of women were being loaded onto the troop ship she witnessed an escape attempt by three men. They were caught and shot. As a deterrent for further escape-attempts ten persons for every escapee were taken hostage and shot.

Ingeborg reveals in an interview she gave to the USC Shoah Foundation in 1997 how 3,000 Jewish women were crowded into the waiting troop ship. She reports how they were all crammed together with only standing space available. There had been no provisions so that the clamour for thirst and hunger was unbearable. The journey lasted 3 days with the ship, carrying the 'Kaiserwald Women,' arriving in Danzig on 6 August 1944.

Stutthof lies 35km from Danzig. The women were transferred from the troop ship into barges that took them to their final destination. She describes the conditions and meagre provisions she and the other women received in Stutthof concentration camp:

In the individual blocks were wooden bunks three tiers high and on each bunk slept 3 to 4 women. We saw nothing of the men until a few days later from afar. In the individual blocks lived 800 to 1,000 women. At 4 0' Clock we had to get up and report on the assembly grounds; often standing until 12 0' Clock. The Blockältesten were Russians and Poles who were dreadful and would lash out for no resson. They distributed the provisions and took a greater share for themselves so that the rations were even less. A meal would be brought at 9 0' Clock and distributed at 12 so that we received it quite cold. Two women received a bowl of around three-quarters of a litre of cabbage and potato soup. In the evening there was a little bread and jam.

Such were the general conditions of the harsh regime in an atmosphere of divide and rule with the upper caste of prisoners - the Blockältesten - imposing their system of rule.

This is how it had been for the 'Kaiserwald Women' back in Riga. Their situation and fears hadn't altered. In Stutthof there were 'selections.' Ingeborg adds:

After two days a 'selection' occured [sic?]. We all had to undress as the SS-doctor came by who then made his choice. Among my acquaintances no one was chosen. Those selected as though sieved out were barred in a particular block only to be led out the next day. This was the only selection I experienced. Though I heard in other parts of the camp they occur on a daily basis.

The men from Kaiserwald that had been transported to Stutthof were, according to Ingeborg's testimony, sent on farther to Buchenwald Concentration Camp. She estimated there were about 1,500 male prisoners that had been shipped from Riga. What happened to the 'Kaiserwald Men' is unclear. Among them was her husband Max, her father-in-law and their close friend Eugen Borkum.

Ingeborg managed to slip away with a close friend after she and some others were route-marched to Bromberg. Hiding in a house vacated by the Germans, she and her friend awaited the first signs of the Red Army. They were liberated after 6 days of hiding. She writes, "The hour had arrived after 4 years of waiting. We were free!"

== Evacuation measures ==
The order to evacuate the Kaiserwald concentration camp occurred over the summer of 1944 as the Soviets crossed into Estonia. On 5 August they approached Riga. Ships were commandeered like the troopship Ingeborg Gerson-Brin was crammed into along with 3,000 other women from Kaiserwald.

However, similar to the chaos that had prevailed in Klooga and in the Vaivara concentration camp in Estonia the German evacuation of labour and resources, troops and armaments was haphazard and erratic. At Riga there weren't enough ships to go around. This resulted with 'selections' being made. Anyone under 18 and over 30 was shot. Anyone expected of an offence was shot. Those deemed to be a risk because it was thought they wouldn't survive the sea voyage were shot. The conditions didn't spiral out of control like the massacre of 2,000 Jewish forced labourers in Klooga on 19 September 1944, but nevertheless executions on a lower scale occurred.

One of the first ships to reach Stutthof from Riga was the troopship carrying Ingeborg and the other 3,000 Jewish women. They arrived in Danzig on 6 August 1944. Other ships followed. How many male and female Jewish slave labourers were evacuated from Riga is unclear. Certainly, 3,000 Jewish women arrived in Stutthof concentration camp.

Around 1500 male labourers are known to have passed through Stutthof. It is thought they may have been forced marched to Buchenwald Concentration Camp. In the last phase of the war, death marches became the norm as central authority in the Third Reich disintegrated while local commanders and police chiefs vented their hatred on Jewish prisoners mocking them and blaming them for Germany's ills. Very few Jews survived the death marches.

== Aftermath ==
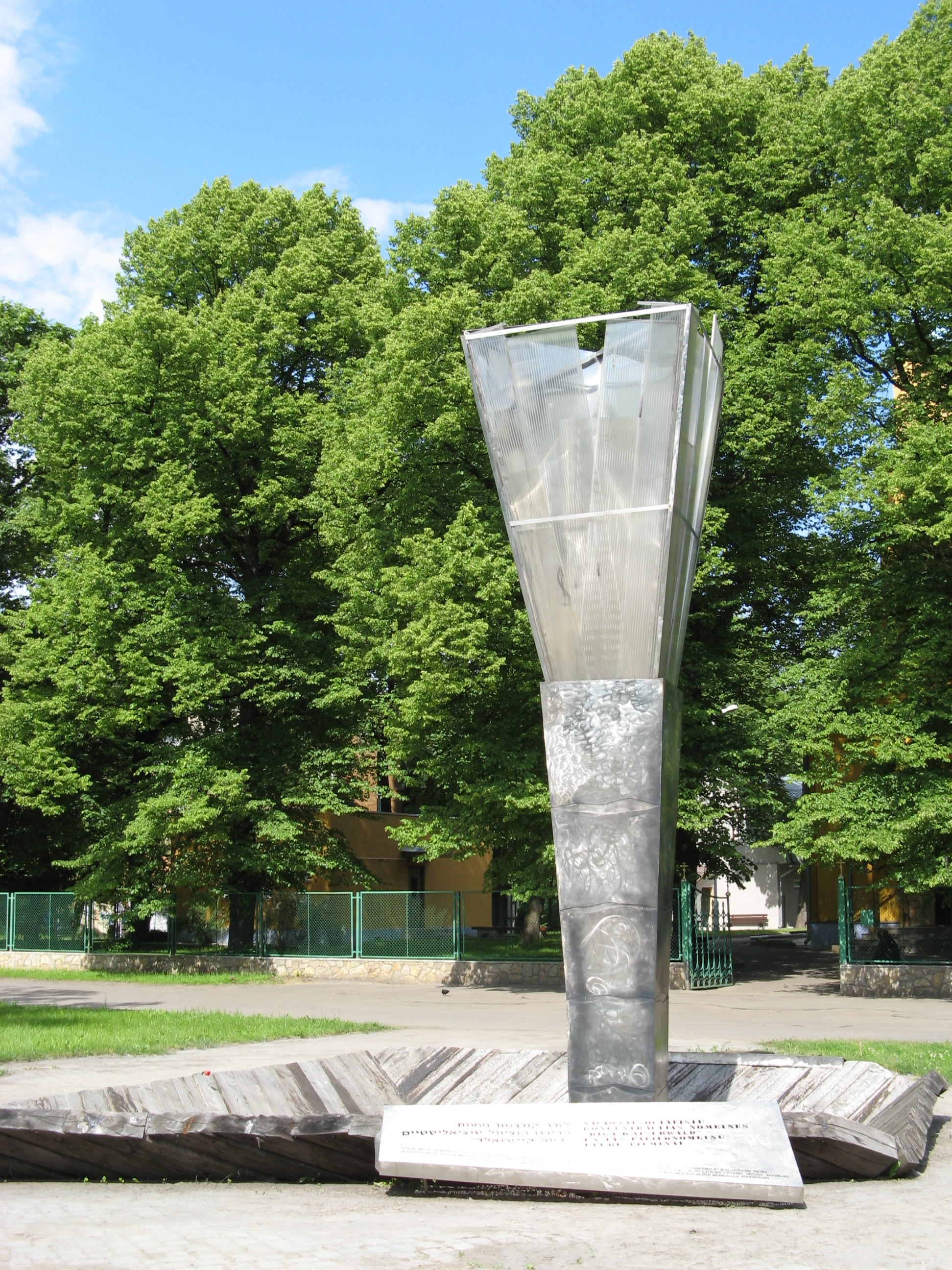
Monument to the victims of the camp in Riga

The remaining inmates from Riga who did not die during the sea voyage arrived at Stutthof in September 1944. But there, the misery didn't end as Stutthof itself had to be evacuated with many prisoners and especially Jews being forced on death marches.

Eventually the Red Army arrived in Danzig and were able to take over Stutthof Concentration Camp on 15 October 1944. But very few prisoners had been left behind. Later as the Soviets asserted their power and occupied Latvia for a second time, they used the former concentration camp as an internment camp to house German prisoners of war. After WWII, the area was fully cleared and apartment buidlings were built in the area by the Soviets.

On June 29, 2006, a monument to the victims and inmates of the camp by Latvian sculptor Solveiga Vasiļjeva was unveiled at its location at Meža prospekts street in Sarkandaugava, Riga. The creation of the memorial was supported by the ambassador of Germany to Latvia, donors from Germany and the Riga City Council, with the President of Latvia, Vaira Vīķe-Freiberga, delivering a speech at the unveiling. The design mimics a 4 meter tall glass and metal torch or a tree of life, sprouting from a bomb crater.

== See also ==
- List of Nazi concentration camps

== Bibliography ==
- Megargee, Geoffrey P., ed. (2012). Encyclopedia of Camps and Ghettos, 1933–1945. in association with United States Holocaust Memorial Museum. Bloomington: Indiana University Press. ISBN 978-0253355997.
- David Cesarani, Final Solution. The Fate of the Jews 1933-1949. Macmillan Press London ISBN 978-3-549-07417-6
