= Selectivity =

Selectivity may refer to:

== Psychology and behaviour ==
- Choice, making a selection among options
- Discrimination, the ability to recognize differences
- Socioemotional selectivity theory, in social psychology

== Engineering ==
- Selectivity (radio), a measure of the performance of a radio receiver to respond only to the radio signal it is tuned
- Selectivity (circuit breakers), the coordination of overcurrent protection devices in an electrical installation

== Biology ==
- Binding selectivity, in pharmacology
- Functional selectivity, in pharmacology
- Natural selection, in biology

== Chemistry ==
- Reactivity–selectivity principle, in general chemistry
- Chemoselectivity, a term used in organic chemistry to describe reactivity of one functional group in the presence of other groups
- Stereoselectivity, a term used in organic chemistry to describe the distribution of isomers in reaction products
- Regioselectivity, a term used in organic chemistry to describe reaction mechanisms and predict reaction products

== Mathematics ==
- Sensitivity and specificity, in statistical theory

== See also ==
- Select (disambiguation)
- Selection (disambiguation)
