= Prestige class =

Prestige class may refer to:

- A premium travel class designation:
  - Prestige Class of Korean Air, the class between Premium Economy and First Class
  - Prestige Class, a premium class of service on Canada's Via Rail
- Prestige class (Dungeons & Dragons), a kind of character class
- Prestige class of the Renault Sport Trophy

== See also ==
- Prestige (disambiguation)
