= Thomas Bernard =

Thomas Bernard may refer to:

- Sir Thomas Bernard, 3rd Baronet (1750–1818), English social reformer
- Thomas Bernard (Irish politician) (c. 1769–1834), Member of Parliament for King's County, 1802–1832
- Sir Thomas Bernard, 6th Baronet (1791–1883), Member of Parliament for Aylesbury, 1857–1865
- Thomas Dehany Bernard (1815–1904), English Anglican cleric
- Thomas Bernard (1816–1882), Anglo-Irish British Army officer
- Thomas Bernhard (1931–1989), Austrian novelist, playwright and poet
- Tom Bernard, American film distributor

== See also ==
- Bernard (surname)
