= Bampton Lectures =

Christian theological lecture series

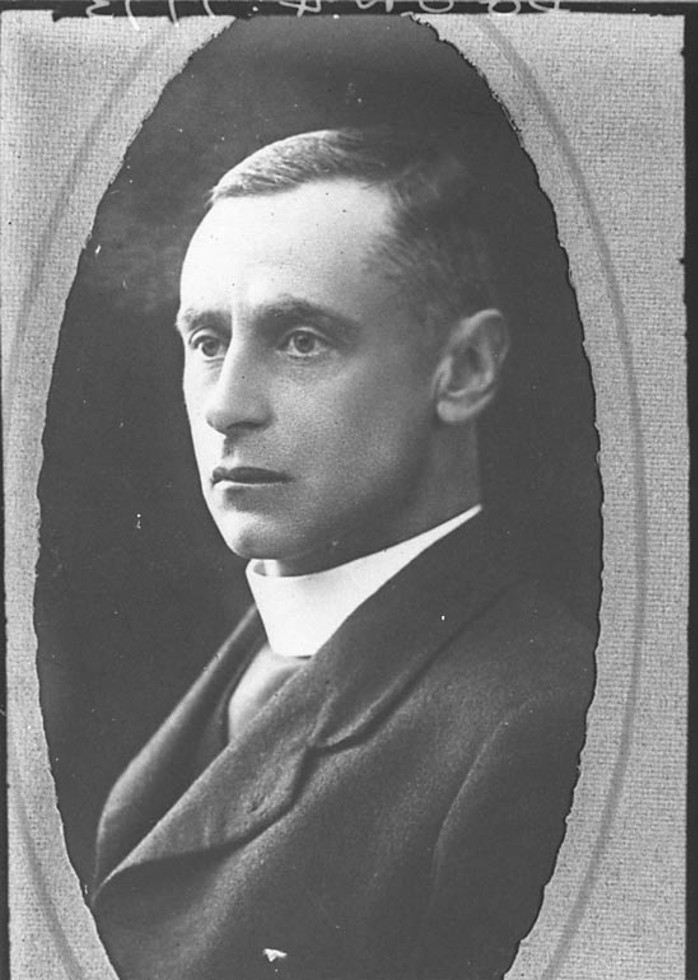
Philip Micklem (1876–1965), an Anglican priest who delivered the 1946 Bampton Lectures

The Bampton Lectures at the University of Oxford, England, were founded by a bequest of John Bampton. They have taken place since 1780. On a number of occasions, especially in the 19th century, they attracted great interest and controversy.

Originally a series of lectures was held annually. In 1896 the income from the agricultural estate which formed the original bequest had reduced so much that the year's lectures were cancelled; since then they have usually been every two years. They continue to concentrate on Christian theological topics. It is a condition of the Bampton Bequest that the lectures are published by the lecturer; they have traditionally been published in book form, and recent ones are available as video recordings.

== Lecturers (incomplete list) ==
Links to the text of some of the lectures up to 1920 are available at the Project Canterbury Web site.

=== 1780–1799 ===
- 1780 – James Bandinel Eight Sermons preached before the University of Oxford
- 1781 – Timothy Neve Eight Sermons preached before the University of Oxford
- 1782 – Robert Holmes The Prophecies and Testimony of John the Baptist, and the parallel Prophecies of Jesus Christ
- 1783 – John Cobb Eight sermons preached before the University of Oxford
- 1784 – Joseph White Mahometism and Christianity
- 1785 – Ralph Churton On the Prophecies Respecting the Destruction of Jerusalem
- 1786 – George Croft Eight Sermons preached before the University of Oxford
- 1787 – William Hawkins Discourses on Scripture Mysteries
- 1788 – Richard Shepherd The Ground and Credibility of the Christian Religion
- 1789 – Edward Tatham Chart and Scale of Truth
- 1790 – Henry Kett A Representation of the Conduct and Opinions of the Primitive Christians, with Remarks on Gibbon and Priestley
- 1791 – Robert Morres Eight sermons preached before the University of Oxford
- 1792 – John Eveleigh Eight Sermons Preached before the University of Oxford
- 1793 – James Williamson The Truth, Inspiration, Authority, and End of the Scriptures, considered and defended
- 1794 – Thomas Wintle Expediency, Prediction, and Accomplishment of the Christian Redemption Illustrated
- 1795 – Daniel Veysie The Doctrine of Atonement illustrated and defended
- 1796 – Robert Gray Sermons on the Principles Upon Which the Reformation of the Church of England was Established
- 1797 – William Finch Objections of Infidel Historians and Other Writers Against Christianity
- 1798 – Charles Henry Hall Fulness of Time
- 1799 – William Barrow Answers to some Popular Objections against the Necessity or the Credibility of the Christian Revelation

=== 1800–1824 ===
- 1800 – George Richards The Divine Origin of Prophecy Illustrated and Defended
- 1801 – George Stanley Faber Horae Mosaicae
- 1802 – George Frederic Nott Religious Enthusiasm
- 1803 – John Farrer Sermons on the Mission and Character of Christ and on the Beatitudes
- 1804 – Richard Laurence An attempt to illustrate those articles of the Church of England, which the Calvinists improperly consider as Calvinistical
- 1805 – Edward Nares A View of the Evidences of Christianity at the End of the Pretended Age of Reason
- 1806 – John Browne, Fellow of Corpus Christi College Eight un-named sermons
- 1807 – Thomas Le Mesurier The Nature and Guilt of Schism
- 1808 – John Penrose An Attempt to Prove the Truth of Christianity
- 1809 – John Bayley Somers Carwithen A view of the Brahminical religion
- 1810 – Thomas Falconer Certain Principles in Evanson's Dissonance of the 'Four generally received Evangelists'
- 1811 – John Bidlake The Truth and Consistency of Divine Revelation
- 1812 – Richard Mant An Appeal to the Gospel
- 1813 – John Collinson A Key to the Writings of the Principal Fathers of the Christian Church who flourished during the first three centuries
- 1814 – William Van Mildert The General Principles of Scripture-Interpretation
- 1815 – Reginald Heber The Personality and Office of the Christian Comforter
- 1816 – John Hume Spry Christian Union Doctrinally and Historically Considered
- 1817 – John Miller The Divine Authority of Holy Scripture
- 1818 – Charles Abel Moysey The Doctrines of Unitarians Examined
- 1819 – Hector Davies Morgan A Compressed View of the Religious Principles and Practices of the Age
- 1820 – Godfrey Faussett The Claims of the Established Church to exclusive attachment and support, and the Dangers which menace her from Schism and Indifference, considered
- 1821 – John Jones The Moral Tendency of Divine Revelation
- 1822 – Richard Whately The Use and Abuse of Party Feeling in Matters of Religion
- 1823 – Charles Goddard The Mental Condition Necessary to a due Inquiry into Religious Evidence
- 1824 – John Josias Conybeare An Attempt to Trace the History and to Ascertain the Limits of the Secondary and Spiritual Interpretation of Scripture

=== 1825–1849 ===
- 1825 – George Chandler The Scheme of Divine Revelation Considered
- 1826 – William Vaux The Benefits Annexed to a Participation in the Two Christian Sacraments of Baptism and the Lord's Supper
- 1827 – Henry Hart Milman Character and Conduct of the Apostles Considered as an Evidence of Christianity
- 1828 – Thomas Horne The Religious Necessity of the Reformation
- 1829 – Edward Burton Inquiry into the Heresies of the Apostolic Age
- 1830 – Henry Soames An inquiry into the doctrines of the Anglo-Saxon church
- 1831 – Thomas William Lancaster The Popular Evidence of Christianity
- 1832 – Renn Dickson Hampden The Scholastic Philosophy considered in its relation to Christian Theology
- 1833 – Frederick Nolan Analogy of Revelation and Science Established
- 1834 – Richard Laurence An Attempt to illustrate those Articles of the Church of England which the Calvinists improperly consider as Calvinistical
- 1836 – Charles Atmore Ogilvie Eight Sermons
- 1837 – Thomas S. L. Vogan The Principal Objections against the Doctrine of the Trinity
- 1838 – Henry Arthur Woodgate The Authoritative Teaching of the Church
- 1839 – William Daniel Conybeare An analytical examination into ... the writings of the Christian Fathers during the Ante-Nicene period
- 1840 – Edward Hawkins Connected Principles
- 1841 – Samuel Wilberforce was invited to lecture but withdrew following the death of his wife Emily
- 1842 – James Garbett Christ, as Prophet, Priest, and King
- 1843 – Anthony Grant The Past and Prospective Extension of the Gospel By Missions to the Heathen
- 1844 – Richard Wiliam Jelf An inquiry into the means of grace, their mutual connection, and combined use, with especial reference to the Church of England
- 1845 – Charles Abel Heurtley Justification
- 1846 – Augustus Short The Witness of the Spirit with our Spirit
- 1847 – Walter Augustus Shirley
- 1848 – Edward Garrard Marsh The Christian Doctrine of Sanctification
- 1849 – Richard Michell The Nature and Comparative Value of the Christian Evidences

=== 1850–1874 ===
- 1850 – Edward Meyrick Goulburn The Resurrection of the Body
- 1851 – Henry Bristow Wilson The Communion of Saints
- 1852 – Joseph Esmond Riddle The Natural History of Infidelity and Superstition in contrast with Christian Faith
- 1853 – William Thomson The Atoning Work of Christ viewed in Relation to some Ancient Theories
- 1854 – Samuel Waldegrave New Testament Millenarianism
- 1855 – John Ernest Bode The Absence of Precision in the Formularies of the Church of England
- 1856 – Edward Arthur Litton The Mosaic Dispensation Considered as Introductory to Christianity
- 1857 – William Edward Jelf Christian Faith, Comprehensive, not Partial; Definite, not Uncertain
- 1858 – Henry Longueville Mansel The Limits of Religious Thought
- 1859 – George Rawlinson Historic Evidence for the Truth of the Christian Records
- 1860 – James Augustus Hessey On Sunday: its Origin, History, and Present Obligation
- 1861 – John Sandford The Mission and Extension of the Church at Home
- 1862 – Adam Storey Farrar A Critical History of Free Thought in reference to the Christian Religion
- 1863 – John Hannah The Relation between the Divine and Human Elements in Holy Scripture
- 1864 – Thomas Dehany Bernard The Progress of Doctrine in the New Testament
- 1865 – James Bowling Mozley Miracles
- 1866 – Henry Parry Liddon The Divinity of Our Lord and Saviour Jesus Christ
- 1867 – Edward Garbett Dogmatic Faith, an inquiry into the relation subsisting between revelation and dogma
- 1868 – George Moberly The Administration of the Holy Spirit in the Body of Christ
- 1869 – Robert Payne Smith Prophecy a Preparation for Christ
- 1870 – William Josiah Irons Christianity as Taught by St. Paul
- 1871 – George Herbert Curteis Dissent, in Its Relation to the Church of England
- 1872 – John Richard Turner Eaton The Permanence of Christianity
- 1873 – Isaac Gregory Smith Characteristics of Christian Morality
- 1874 – Stanley Leathes The Religion of the Christ

=== 1875–1899 ===
- 1875 – William Jackson, FSA Fellow of Worcester College, Oxford The Doctrine of Retribution
- 1876 – William Alexander The Witness of the Psalms to Christ and Christianity
- 1877 – Charles Adolphus Row Christian evidences viewed in relation to modern thought
- 1878 – Charles Henry Hamilton Wright Zechariah and his Prophecies Considered in Relation to Modern Criticism
- 1879 – Henry Wace The Foundations of Faith
- 1880 – Edwin Hatch The Origin of Early Christian Churches
- 1881 – John Wordsworth The One Religion: truth, holiness and peace desired by the nations, and revealed by Jesus Christ
- 1882 – Peter Goldsmith Medd The One Mediator
- 1883 – William Henry Fremantle The World as the Subject of Redemption
- 1884 – Frederick Temple The Relations between Religion and Science
- 1885 – Frederic William Farrar The History of Interpretation
- 1886 – Charles Bigg The Christian Platonists of Alexandria
- 1887 – William Boyd Carpenter Permanent Elements of Religion
- 1888 – Robert Edward Bartlett The Letter and the Spirit
- 1889 – Thomas Kelly Cheyne The Origin and Contents of the Psalter
- 1890 – Henry William Watkins Modern Criticism considered in its Relation to the Fourth Gospel
- 1891 – Charles Gore The Incarnation of the Son of God
- 1892 – Alfred Barry Some Light of Science on the Faith
- 1893 – William Sanday Inspiration
- 1894 – John Richardson Illingworth Personality, Human and Divine
- 1895 – Thomas Banks Strong Christian Ethics
- 1897 – Robert Lawrence Ottley Aspects of the Old Testament
- 1899 – William Ralph Inge Christian Mysticism (online text)

=== 1900–1949 ===
- 1901 – Archibald Robertson Regnum Dei
- 1903 – William Holden Hutton The Influence of Christianity Upon National Character
- 1905 – Frederick William Bussell Christian Theology and Social Progress
- 1907 – James Hamilton Francis Peile Reproach of the Gospel: An Inquiry into the Apparent Failure of Christianity
- 1909 – Walter Hobhouse Church and the World: in Idea and in History
- 1911 – John Huntley Skrine Creed and the Creeds: Their Function in Religion
- 1913 – George Edmundson The Church in Rome in the First Century
- 1915 – Hastings Rashdall The Idea of Atonement in Christian Theology
- 1920 – Arthur Cayley Headlam Doctrine of the Church and Christian Reunion
- 1922 – Leighton Pullan Religion Since the Reformation
- 1924 – Norman Powell Williams The Ideas of the Fall and of Original Sin
- 1926 – Alfred Edward John Rawlinson New Testament Doctrine of the Christ
- 1928 – Kenneth E. Kirk The Vision of God: The Christian Doctrine of the Summum Bonum ISBN 0-8192-2087-6
- 1930 – Laurence Grensted Psychology and God a study of the implications of recent psychology for religious belief and practice
- 1932 – B. H. Streeter Buddha and the Christ
- 1934 – Robert Henry Lightfoot History and Interpretation in the Gospels
- 1936 – Frank Herbert Brabant Time and eternity in Christian thought
- 1938 – Alfred Guillaume Prophecy and Divination among the Hebrews and other Semites
- 1940 – George Leonard Prestige Fathers and Heretics ISBN 0-281-00452-8
- 1942 – Trevor Gervase Jalland The Church and the Papacy: a Historical Study
- 1944 – Spencer Leeson Christian Education
- 1946 – Philip Arthur Micklem The Secular and the Sacred
- 1948 – Austin Farrer The Glass of Vision

=== 1950–1999 ===
- 1952 – Robert Leslie Pollington Milburn Early Christian Interpretations of History
- 1954 – Henry Ernest William Turner The Pattern of Christian Truth: A Study in the Relations Between Orthodoxy and Heresy in the Early Church
- 1955 – Thomas Maynard Parker Christianity and the State in the Light of History
- 1956 – E. L. Mascall Christian Theology and Natural Science: Some Questions on their Relations
- 1958 – John Gordon Davies He Ascended Into Heaven
- 1960 - Eric Waldram Kemp Counsel and Consent
- 1962 – Alan Richardson History Sacred and Profane
- 1964 – Stephen Neill Church and Christian Union
- 1966 – David Edward Jenkins The Glory of Man
- 1968 – Frederick William Dillistone Traditional Symbols and the Contemporary World
- 1970 – Cheslyn Jones Christ and Christianity: a study in origins in the light of St Paul
- 1972 – Howard E. Root The Limits of Radicalism
- 1974 – Peter Baelz The Forgotten Dream: Experience, Hope and God
- 1976 – Geoffrey W. H. Lampe God As Spirit ISBN 0-19-826644-8
- 1978 – A. R. Peacocke Creation and the World of Science
- 1980 – Anthony E. Harvey Jesus and the Constraints of History
- 1982 – Peter Hinchcliff Holiness and Politics ISBN 0-232-51502-6
- 1984 – J. A. T. Robinson The Priority of John
- 1986 – Maurice Wiles God's Action in the World
- 1988 – John Barton People of the Book?
- 1990 – Alister E. McGrath Genesis of Doctrine: a Study in the Foundations of Doctrinal Criticism
- 1992 – Colin Gunton The One, the Three and the Many: God, Creation and the Culture of Modernity ISBN 0-521-42184-5
- 1994 – Eric William Heaton The School Tradition of the Old Testament
- 1996 – Ursula King Christ in All Things: Exploring Spirituality With Teilhard De Chardin ISBN 1-57075-115-3

=== Since 2000 ===
Video recordings of the most recent years' lectures are available via links to YouTube.

- 2000 – John Habgood Varieties of Unbelief
- 2001 – David Fergusson Church, State and Civil Society ISBN 0-521-52959-X
- 2003 – Oliver O'Donovan The Ways of Judgment ISBN 978-0-8028-2920-7
- 2005 – Paul S. Fiddes Seeing the world and knowing God: ancient wisdom and modern doctrine
- 2007 – Raymond Plant Religion, Citizenship and Liberal Pluralism
- 2009 – Richard Parish Catholic Particularity in Seventeenth-Century French Writing: Christianity is Strange
- 2011 – Frances Young God's Presence: A Contemporary Recapitulation Of Early Christianity
- 2013 – Michael Banner Imagining life: Christ and the human condition
- 2015 – David F. Ford, Daring Spirit: John's Gospel Now
- 2017 – George Pattison A Phenomenology of the Devout Life
- 2019 – Peter Harrison Rethinking Relations Between Science and Religion YouTube Published as Some New World: Myths of Supernatural Belief in a Secular Age
- 2021 – Jessica Martin Four-Dimensional Eucharist
- 2022 - Alec Ryrie The age of Hitler, and how we can escape it
- 2023 - Willie James Jennings Jesus and the Displaced: Christology and the Redemption of Habitation
- 2024 - Rowan Williams Recognizing Strangers: Solidarity and Christian Ethics
- 2025 - Wil Gafney Wading in the Word: Womanist Biblical Interpretation

== See also ==
- Bampton Lectures (Columbia University)
- Hulsean Lectures
