= Thomas Lancaster (disambiguation) =

Thomas Lancaster (died 1583) was an English Protestant clergyman.

Thomas Lancaster may also refer to:

- Thomas Lancaster (died 1610), politician, MP for West Looe (UK Parliament constituency)
- Thomas William Lancaster (1787–1869), vicar of Banbury and fellow of Queen's College, Oxford
- Thomas Percival Lancaster (1877–1968), newspaper publisher and political figure in Ontario
- Thomas, 2nd Earl of Lancaster (1278–1322), one of the leaders of the baronial opposition to Edward II of England
