= OLAY =

American skin care brand owned by Procter & Gamble

Olay
- The logo of Olay
- Product type: Beauty products
- Current owner: Procter & Gamble
- Country: United States
- Introduced: 1952; 74 years ago
- Markets: Worldwide
- Previous owners: Adams National Industries
- Tagline: "Ageless"
- Website: www.olay.com

Olay or Olaz, previously Oil of Olay, Oil of Olaz, Oil of Ulan, or Oil of Ulay, is an American skin care brand owned by Procter & Gamble (P&G). For the 2009 fiscal year, which ended on June 30, Olay accounted for an estimated $2.8 billion of P&G's revenue.

== History ==
=== Early days ===
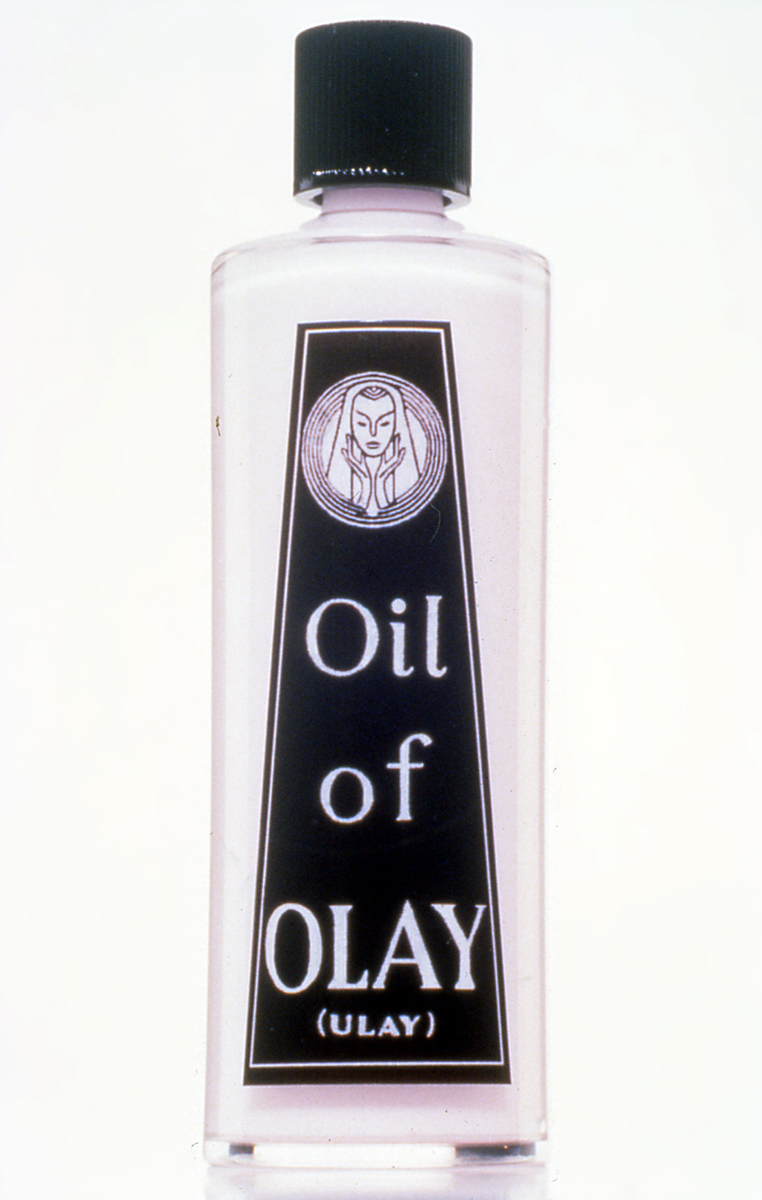
Original Oil of Olay c. 1952

Olay originated in South Africa as Oil of Olay. Graham Wulff (1916–2008), a former Unilever chemist from Durban, started it in 1952. He chose the name "Oil of Olay" as a spin on the word "lanolin", a key ingredient.

It was unique in the early days because it was a pink fluid rather than a cream, packaged in a heavy glass bottle. Wulff and his marketing partner, Jack Lowe, a former copywriter, had tested the product on their wives and friends and were confident in its uniqueness and quality.

Olay's marketing was also unique, since it was never described as a moisturizer, nor even as beauty fluid. Nowhere on the packaging did it say what the product actually did. Print advertisements used copy such as "Share the secret of a younger looking you" and talked about the "beauty secret" of Oil of Olay. Other advertisements were written as personal messages to the reader from a fictitious advice columnist named Margaret Merril. They ran in Reader's Digest and newspapers and often looked like editorials.

Wulff and Lowe, who ran the company under the banner of Adams National Industries (ANI), did not sell the product to the trade. It instead waited for pharmacies to ask for it based on consumer requests.

As the company began to market the product internationally, the ANI decided to modify the name of the product in each country so it would sound pleasing and realistic to consumers. This led to the introduction of Oil of Ulay (Ireland and the United Kingdom), Oil of Ulan (Australia), and Oil of Olaz (France, Germany, Italy, and the Netherlands). In 1970, the ANI opened a test market in the United States (Chicago) and was expanding into northern Germany.

=== 1970–1985 ===
Richardson Merrell Inc. (later Richardson-Vicks Inc.) acquired ANI in November 1970. RVI capitalized the "Oil" and added the sub-name "Beauty Fluid" to help protect the trademark. They further added a sales force and created TV advertising. The company extended the product range to include items such as Night of Ulay and Beauty Cleanser and expanded into more countries (Spain, France, and Germany).

The result of Richardson Merrell's efforts was a dramatic increase in sales. However, as with many brands, the business was not uniformly managed, so there were differences in performance between countries.

=== 1985–2000 ===
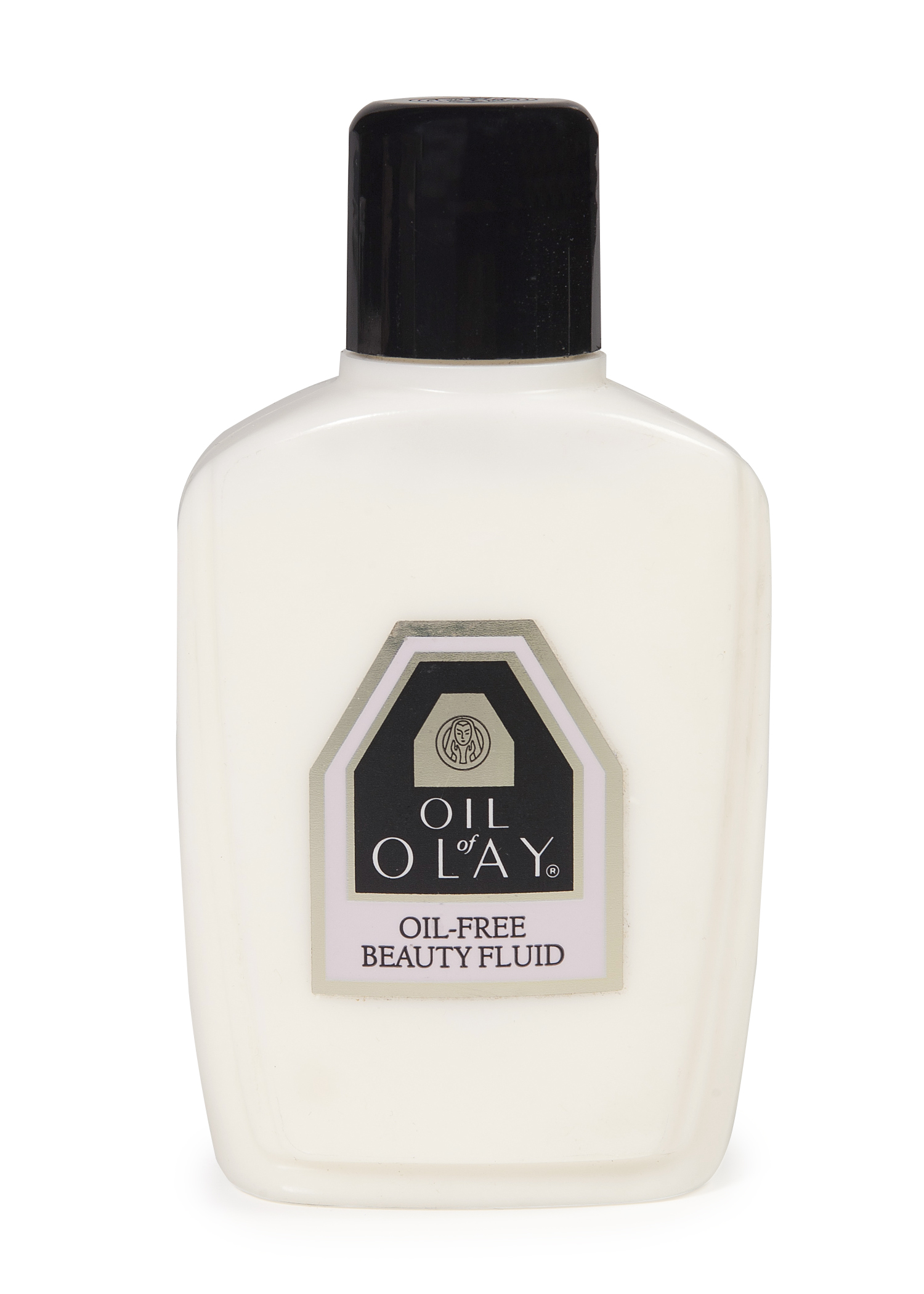
Oil of Olay c. 1992

RVI was acquired by Procter & Gamble in 1985. P&G greatly expanded Olay both in the line-up and internationally. Olay became P&G's 13th billion dollar brand in 2013.

Since then, the range has been expanded to include a full range of hypoallergenic variants, cleansers and creams. The brand also includes soap, and body wash. Olay Cosmetics was launched in 1996 but discontinued in 2001.

==== Name change ====
In 1999, P&G decided to unify the brand under a global name. Thus, Oil of Ulan and Ulay became Olay on a worldwide basis, except in German-speaking regions and Italy, where it remained "Oil of Olaz". In the Netherlands and Belgium, it renamed to just "Olaz".

=== 2000 to present ===
In October 2000, Olay was launched in the Philippines, and in August 2007, it was launched in India. From 2010 to 2020, Oil of OLAZ was simply known as OLAZ in German-speaking countries, with the slogan "Olaz lässt Sie strahlen" (lit.: "Olaz lets you shine"). Since 2020 OLAZ has also been marketed as OLAY in German-speaking countries.

== Ingredients ==
Olay uses many different ingredients in the production of their skin care line. The main ingredients used include retinyl propionate (vitamin A derivative), glycerin, niacinamide (vitamin B3), broad spectrum sunscreen, coconut oil, and amino peptides.

== See also ==
- List of Procter & Gamble brands
- Masstige
