= William Finch =

William Finch may refer to:

- William Finch (bishop) (died 1559), bishop of Taunton
- William Finch (merchant) (died 1613), English merchant
- William Finch (diplomat) (1691–1766), British diplomat and politician
- William Finch (Bampton lecturer) (1747–1810), English clergyman
- William Finch (politician) (1832–1911), first African American elected to serve on the Atlanta City Council
- William Clement Finch (1753–1794), British admiral and MP for Surrey
- William Finch (captain) of the SS Arabic (1902)
- William Coles Finch (1864–1944), British historian
- William R. Finch (1847–1913), United States diplomat

== See also ==
- Alfred William Finch (1854–1930), ceramist and painter
- Bill Finch (disambiguation)
