= Valgerður Þóroddsdóttir =

Icelandic poet (born 1989)

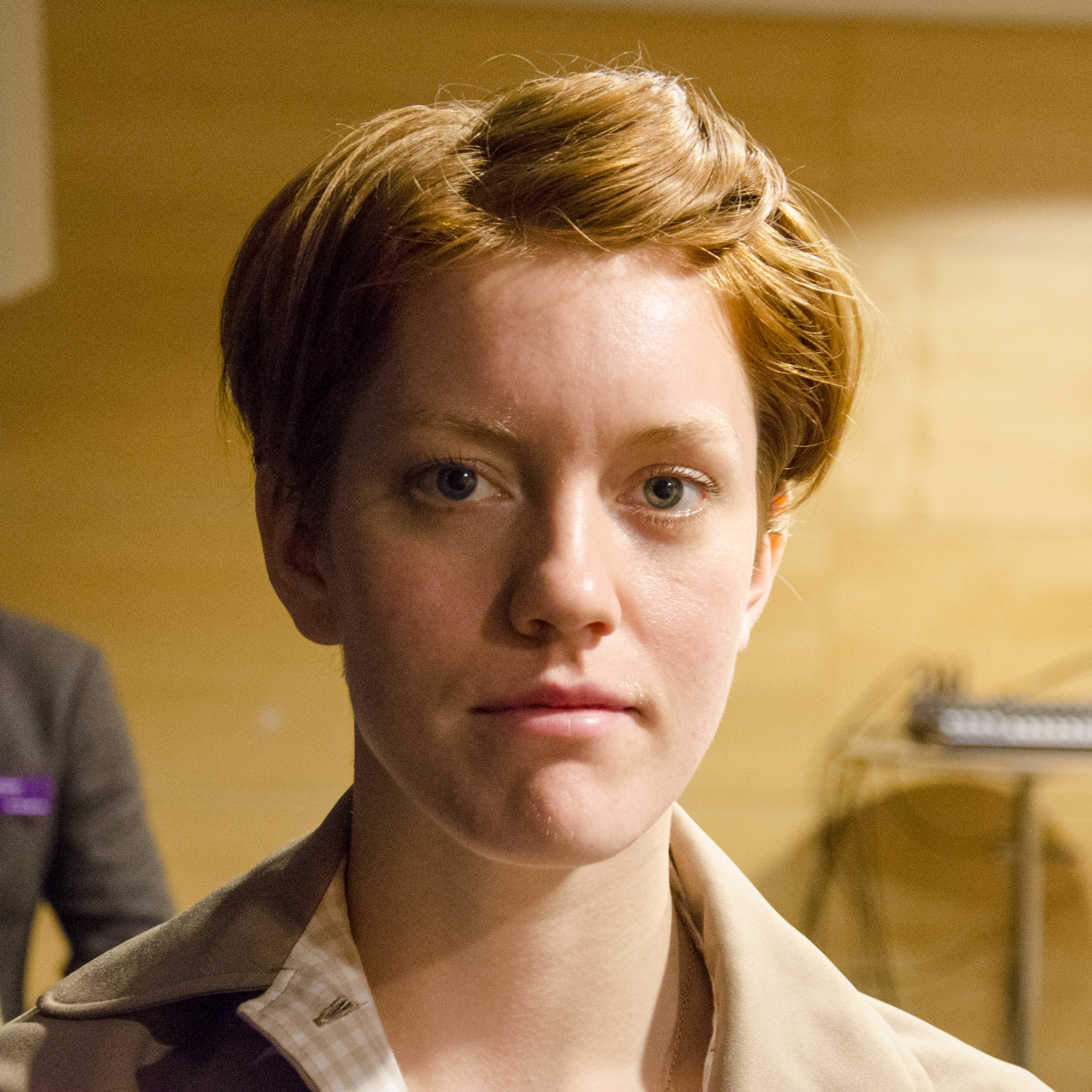
- Valgerður in 2015
- Born: 1989 (age 36–37); Reykjavík, Iceland
- Occupations: Poet, publisher, literary curator
- Writing career
- Language: Icelandic, English
- Genre: Poetry

Valgerður Þóroddsdóttir (born 1989), also known as Vala Thorodds, is an Icelandic poet, publisher, translator and literary curator. She is one of the founders and current directors of Meðgönguljóð, a grassroots literary organisation and publisher of poetry based in Iceland. Her work has appeared in print in various anthologies and magazines in Reykjavík, Berlin, Bristol, and Zaragosa. In 2014, Valgerður was nominated on behalf of Iceland to the PEN International New Voices Award.

== Personal life ==
Valgerður was born in Iceland but raised in upstate New York. She returned to Iceland at the age of 17.

== Career ==
Valgerður co-founded and currently serves as a director for two independent publishing companies: Meðgönguljóð (Partus forlag), basked in Reykjavík, Iceland, and Partus Press, based in the United Kingdom.

She wrote for magazines in Spain, the UK, Germany and Iceland, and in 2014, she was Iceland's nomination for the PEN International New Voices Award.

Her first chapbook, the booklet-length poem Það sem áður var skógur (What Once Was Forest), was edited by Sjón and published in the chapbook series Meðgönguljóð in Iceland in 2015. Her edition and translation from the Icelandic of the selected poems of Kristín Ómarsdóttir, Waitress in Fall, was co-published in the UK in 2018 by Carcanet Press and Partus Press and was selected by The Sunday Times as one of the best poetry books of the year. Thorodd's translation of Ómarsdóttir's novel Swanfolk, which will be published in 2022, was supported by a PEN/Heim Translation Fund Grant.

== See also ==
- Partus Press
