= Bill Finch =

Bill Finch may refer to:

- Bill Finch (architect) (1913–2003), American architect
- Bill Finch (politician), mayor of Bridgeport, Connecticut and former Connecticut State Senator

== See also ==
- William Finch (disambiguation)
