= R. J. Parish =

French literature scholar

Richard John Parish (1948-2022) was a scholar of French literature. He was Professor of French at the University of Oxford between 1996 and 2015.

== Career ==
Born in 1948, Parish was educated at Newcastle University, graduating with a BA in 1970. He then completed his doctoral studies at the University of Oxford; his DPhil was awarded in 1974 for his thesis "The abbé de Choisy (1644–1724): a historical and critical study".

Parish was appointed to a lectureship at the University of Liverpool in 1973; he returned to Oxford in 1976 when he was elected a fellow and tutor in French at St Catherine's College and appointed to a university lectureship. He was awarded the title of Professor of French in 1996 and retired in 2015, since when he has been an emeritus professor. He was appointed an officier of the French Ordre des Palmes académiques in 2001 and was promoted to the grade of Commandeur in 2012. He gave the Bampton Lectures in 2009.

He died on 1 January 2022.

== Selected publications ==
=== Monographs ===
- Pascal's Lettres Provinciales: A Study in Polemic (Oxford: Clarendon Press, 1989).
- Racine: The Limits of Tragedy (Paris, Seattle, Tubingen: Papers on French Seventeenth Century Literature, 1993).
- Catholic Particularity in Seventeenth-Century French Writing: "Christianity is Strange" (Oxford: Oxford University Press, 2011).

=== Editions or translations of texts ===
- (ed.) Abbé de Choisy et Abbé de Dangeau: Quatre Dialogues: I. Sur l'lmmortaluté de l'Ame II. Sur l'Existence de Dieu III. Sur la Providence IV. Sur la Religion; suivis de Pierre Jurieu: Apologie d'un tour nouveau pour les Quatre Dialogues de M. l'abbé de Dangeau (Fribourg: Éditions universitaires, 1981).
- (ed.) Moliere, Le Tartuffe (Bristol: Bristol Classical Texts, 1994).
- (ed.) Racine, Berenice (Paris: Gallimard, 1994).
- (ed.) Racine, Phedre (London: Bristol Classical Texts, 1996).
- (ed.) Scarron: Le Roman Comique, Critical Guides to French Texts, no. 119 (Valencia: Grant and Cutler, 1999).
- (ed.) Jean de La Bruyère [et Louis-Ellies du Pin], Dialogues posthumes sur le quiétisme (Grenoble: Jérôme Millon, 2005).
- (ed.) Éloge et pensées de Pascal: édition établie par Condorcet, annotée par Voltaire (Oxford: Voltaire Foundation, 2008).
