= Sidney A. Alexander =

English poet, author, and clergyman (1866–1948)

Sydney A. Alexander
- Alexander in c1916.
- Born: April 2, 1866
- Died: February 4, 1948 (aged 81); London
- Occupations: poet, author, clergyman

Sidney Arthur Alexander (April 2, 1866 – February 4, 1948) was an English poet, author, and clergyman.

== Early life ==
The son of a bank clerk, Alexander was educated at St Paul's School and Trinity College, Oxford, where he received his B.A. in 1889 with a number of distinctions and prizes. He received praise for his poetry while attending St. Paul's (the beginning of a lifelong association with the Cathedral), notably "Caedmon," which won the Milton Prize poem in 1882. The promise of those early efforts was crowned by Alexander’s receiving the Newdigate prize at Oxford in 1887 for Sakya-Muni: The Story of Buddha. The poem was generally well received in the Oxford Magazine (“sustained melody and grace....certain higher touches of imagination and expression which give to the simple and quiet style an air of finish and distinction”). A modern literary historian sets the poem in the Victorian context of “a trend of swelling interest in the West in Buddhism.”

== Literary career ==
Alexander built on his academic success in verse by placing a number of poems in some of the leading Victorian periodicals, Academy, English Illustrated Magazine, Macmillan's, Cassell's and others; several of his poems were reprinted in America. But Alexander’s career became that of a clergyman, distinguished to some extent by his religious essays and books but more by his efforts to safeguard the fabric of St. Paul’s Cathedral, where he became a Canon in 1909 and where his responsibilities encompassed those of Treasurer. Alexander had been ordained to a curacy at St. Michael's Church, Oxford and was a lecturer and tutor at Keble College, Oxford until his appointment in 1893 as Reader of the Temple, followed by appointments as Canon of Gloucester and head of the Gloucester College of Mission Clergy in March 1902.

Alexander’s books include "Christ and Scepticism" (1894), The Christianity of St. Paul (1899) and Progressive Revelation (1910), works which have been described as the product of "a mind well versed in philosophy and theology.” In these, as well as in his sermons and elsewhere, he was someone “who knew his own mind". He had a special sympathy for the unfortunates of society and served on the Central (Unemployed) Body for London and, during World War I, on the Mansion House War Relief Committee. Most of his poetry, however, remained unpublished, but was carefully preserved in a manuscript notebook.

Alexander’s work, especially his fundraising, on behalf of St. Paul’s was noteworthy. He agitated from early in his canonical career for the structural and financial needs of the cathedral, articulating and responding to environmental threats to the very fabric of the building, built on shallow foundations above treacherous sand ("We must have wet sand!" cried Canon Alexander fervently [in 1930]. "We must have wet sand!"). His dedication to the central role of the cathedral in the faith of England is clear in his lectures and publications about St. Paul’s, including The Safety of St. Paul’s (1927), and about its architect, Christopher Wren. Alexander’s strengthening and protecting the structure of the Cathedral helped it survive the German bombings of World War II, as was recognized by the Archbishop of Canterbury in 1944. Even before the war he had been awarded several honors.

Alexander married in 1891 Lily Redfern, who died at their home, 2, Amen Court, on December 17, 1937.

== See also ==
- List of English-language poets
