= G. E. Trevelyan =

English writer

Gertrude Eileen Trevelyan
- Born: 17 October 1903; Bath, Somerset, England
- Died: 22 February 1941 (aged 37); Bath, Somerset, England
- Occupation: Writer

Gertrude Eileen Trevelyan (17 October 1903 – 22 February 1941) was an English novelist. She is the first woman to be awarded the Newdigate prize.

== Early life ==
Trevelyan was born on 17 October 1903 in Bath, Somerset, England. Her father, Edward Trevelyan, reported his occupation as "private means" on the 1911 Census, which also showed the family as employing four domestic servants. Her only brother, John Otto Trevelyan, died as an infant in 1908. She attended Princess Helena College, then located in Ealing, and was confirmed at St Peter's Church, Ealing in 1920. She attended Lady Margaret Hall, Oxford from 1923 to 1927, graduating with a second-class degree.

== Personal life ==
After leaving Oxford, she moved to London, where she first lived in a women's residence hotel in Bermondsey. She later lived as a lodger in several locations in Kensington. She had a modest inheritance that enabled her to concentrate on her writing. She chose not to engage in any activities that would have made her more well-known, such as teaching or reviewing. She did not get married and had a small group of friends.

Trevelyan was injured in October 1940 when the flat she was living in at 107 Lansdowne Road, Notting Hill, was damaged during the Blitz. She died of her injuries at a care home in Bath in February 1941.

== Writing ==
While at Lady Margaret Hall, Oxford, she won the Newdigate Prize for a 250-line poem in blank verse titled, "Julia, Daughter of Claudius". The subject of the poem was referred to in John Addington Symonds' book, Renaissance in Italy. During excavations on the Appian Way in 1485, a perfectly preserved body of a girl around 15 was discovered. The body was removed to the Capitol, where it became the object of a cult that led the Pope to order the body to be removed and buried in secret. She told the Daily Mail, "I did it for a joke", and said that she had written little poetry before the competition. The poem was published soon after by Basil Blackwell.

Her first novel, Appius and Virginia, was published by Martin Secker in 1932. Taking its title from the play by John Webster, the book told of an experiment undertaken by an English spinster, Virginia Hutton, to raise an orangutan she names Appius as a human. She trains Appius to sit up, eat like a human, and spends years attempting to get him to speak, read, and write. Trevelyan takes the reader into the minds of both Virginia and Appius, revealing the failure of both to understand the other in any meaningful way. In his review for The Spectator, L. A. G. Strong called it, "A work by a new author which is exciting both in promise and achievement. Miss Trevelyan has made a brilliant debut." Appius and Virginia was Trevelyan's only book to be published in the United States as well as the United Kingdom.

Her second novel, Hot-House, was published by Martin Secker in 1933. The book drew heavily on her experiences at Oxford, showing an undergraduate, Mina Cook, and her relationships while a student at the fictional "Queen Anne's College." Reviewing the book in the Daily Mail, Compton Mackenzie wrote, "The whole thing is extremely well done, and by the time I had finished with it the atmosphere of damp heat had made me feel like an overfed gloxinia."

In 1934, Martin Secker published As It Was in the Beginning, which took place entirely in the mind of a woman lying in a care home in the last few days before her death. Trevelyan takes the reader back through the woman's life, in memories, to the moment of her birth. The Times Literary Supplement review called it, "a book which is almost unreadable in its intensity, but which compels one to go on reading in spite of almost physical discomfort, by the admiration one feels for the author's ingenuity and her uncanny insight into human beings."

A War Without a Hero (1935), her longest novel, was her last to be published by Martin Secker. Its reviews were mostly critical. In the Manchester Guardian, one reviewer wrote, "The use of a modern technique by which unspoken thoughts are shot on to the page in machine-gun sentences generally beginning with the verb does not suffice to make the mutual attraction of the young people credible.... Miss Trevelyan leaves one reader unconvinced."

Her next three novels were published by Victor Gollancz.

Two Thousand Million Man-Power, published in 1937, showed the influence of John Dos Passos, as Trevelyan interwove headlines from newspaper stories, radio bulletins, and newsreels into the story of a London couple, Katherine and Robert, as they go through courtship and early marriage while dealing with financial worries, unemployment, and social standing. Reviewing the book for The Guardian, Wilfrid Gibson wrote, "The theme of the book is the grip of the modern machine which whirls us all in its soul-destroying revolutions."

Theme with Variations and William's Wife were both published in 1938. The first was Trevelyan's most experimental work, weaving the narratives of three very different Londoners, none of whom ever encounter the other and all of whom come to tragic ends. In her review for The Times Literary Supplement, Leonora Eyles wrote, "There is pity in this book and something of horror: it is as though the author had looked on human nature and turned away with a mixture of disgust and compassion from what she has seen. But, as always, Miss Trevelyan's genius and her sincerity make her book one that the reader cannot lay aside." William's Wife followed a housemaid, Jane Atkins, from the day of her wedding to William Chirp, a greengrocer whose miserly control distorts her attitude and behavior and eventually lead her to live as a recluse gleaning her food from the waste of London markets. Writing in The Times Literary Supplement, Eyles proclaimed that, "Miss Trevelyan's scope of human experience makes her one of the most important novelists of our day, and there are signs in this last book that she is choosing from among more human and usual types for her characters than she has done before."

Her last novel, Trance by Appointment, was published by George G. Harrap and Co. in 1939. It told the story of a lower-class girl, Jean, who has visions, which leads her to work as a fortune teller and then marriage to an astrologer who gradually corrupts her powers. Reviewing the book for The Listener, Edwin Muir wrote, "It is a sordid, pitiable little story, told with that cruel attention to detail which characterises Miss Trevelyan's art.... [I]t is very circumscribed; but every touch is genuine, and that itself gives the book distinction."

== Legacy ==
Trevelyan was largely forgotten after her death and for many years her work was out of print. In 2020, however, her first novel, Appius and Virginia, was republished by Eye & Lightning Books, followed by a number of reissues from Boiler House Press.

== Works ==
Poetry

- Julia, Daughter of Claudius (1927)

Novels

- Appius and Virginia (Secker, 1932; Lightning Books, 2020) ISBN 978-1-78563-218-1
- Hot-House (Secker, 1933)
- As It Was in the Beginning (Secker, 1934; Boiler House Press, 2024)
- A War Without a Hero (Secker, 1935)
- Two Thousand Million Man-Power (Gollancz, 1937; Boiler House Press, 2022)
- William's Wife (Gollancz, 1938; Boiler House Press, 2023)
- Theme with Variations (Gollancz, 1938)
- Trance by Appointment (Harrap & Co., 1939; Boiler House Press, 2025)
