= Trevor Gervase Jalland =

Church historian

- Born: 14 October 1896; United Kingdom
- Died: 14 May 1975 (aged 78); Oxford, England
- Occupations: Church historian, author
- Scientific career
- Fields: History of the Catholic Church
- Workplaces: University of Exeter

Trevor Gervase Jalland (14 October 1896 – 14 May 1975) was a British priest and Patristics scholar who wrote a number of books on the history of the Church.

== Biography ==
Jalland was born on 14 October 1896, and died on 14 May 1975.

== Career ==
Jalland served as the Vicar of St Thomas the Martyr Church in Oxford, England from 1933 to 1947. In 1944, he became a member of the Faculty of Theology at the University of Oxford. He served as the head of the Department of Theology at the University of Exeter from 1957 to 1962.

He delivered the Bampton Lectures in 1942.

== Bibliography ==
He is the author of a number of notable books:

- The Church and the Papacy: A Historical Study
- The Open Bible
- The Church of God
- The Bible, the Church and South India
- Origin and Development of the Christian Church
- This Our Sacrifice: A Brief Theological and Historical Study

== See also ==
- University of Exeter
- History of the papacy
