= Wilfred Rowland Childe =

British author and poet

Wilfred Rowland Childe (26 April 1890 – 10 November 1952) was a British author and poet.

He was born in Wakefield, Yorkshire, the eldest son of Henry Slade Childe, chairman of the Yorkshire Railway Wagon Company Ltd., and Kate France Child.

Childe was educated at Harrow School and Magdalen College, Oxford. He edited Oxford Poetry in 1916 and 1917.

In 1922, Childe became an Assistant Lecturer in English literature at the University of Leeds, being promoted to Lecturer in 1931.

He became a Roman Catholic convert in 1916.

He is chiefly remembered for Dream English: A Fantastical Romance (1917) which was and still is something of a minor cult book. He was admired by Arthur Machen and later by the poet Robin Skelton. His Selected Poems was published in 1936. He associated with the Sitwells, but was no modernist.

He died at Harrogate, aged 62. He was eulogised in The Times by a friend, who wrote,

"His influence on young poets and his practical, though covert, assistance to them were very great; he was all his life a poet himself with many volumes to his credit- poems full of his own calmness and gentle vision and sincere, contemplative thought, which never claimed to be more than a true expression of his own nature. But to those who knew him and were taught by him, it is the memory of his great kindness, saintly patience, and sweetness of character which will be held most dear."

== Works ==
- The Little City (1911)
- The Escaped Princess, and Other Poems (1916)
- Dream English. A Fantastical Romance (1917)
- The Gothic Rose (1922)
- Ivory Palaces (1925)
- Blue Distance (1930) travel writing
- The Golden Thurible
- The Garland of Armor
- Selected Poems (1936)
- The Happy Garden (1945)
- The Blessèd Pastures (1950)
