= Prestige =

Prestige is commonly understood to mean "reputation" (or "reputational prestige").

It may also refer to:

== Arts, entertainment and media ==
=== Films ===
- Prestige (film), a 1932 American film directed by Tay Garnett: woman travels to French Indochina to meet up with husband
- The Prestige, a 2006 American thriller directed by Christopher Nolan
- Prestige picture, a film purposely created to lend a film studio the appearance of artistic integrity

=== Music ===
- Prestige Records, American jazz record label
- Prestige (Daddy Yankee album), 2012
- Prestige (Rondò Veneziano album), 1991
- The Prestige (album), an album by Illdisposed

=== Other uses in arts, entertainment, and media ===
- Prestige (magazine), a Lebanese French-language women's fashion quarterly
- Prestige, the final portion of a magic trick, typically a showy flourish (17th c.)
- The Prestige (novel), 1995 novel by Christopher Priest

== Brands and enterprises ==
- Prestige (beer), a Haitian lager
- Citi Prestige, a premium Citibank credit card
- Ibanez RG Prestige, a brand of guitars manufactured by Ibanez
- Plaxton Prestige, a single-deck bus body built by Plaxton
- Prestige Brands, an American manufacturer of personal care and home cleaning products
- Prestige group, real estate developer in India
- TTK Prestige, an Indian manufacturer of pressure cookers and other kitchen appliances.

== Horse and greyhound races ==
- Prestige (greyhounds), a greyhound racing competition
- Prestige Novices' Hurdle, a Grade 2 National Hunt hurdle race in Great Britain
- Prestige Stakes, a thoroughbred horse race in Great Britain

== People ==
- George Leonard Prestige (1889-1955), English theologian

== Ships ==
- MV Prestige, Greek-owned oil tanker sunk in 2002
- MSC Prestige, a container ship
- USS Prestige, various American ships

== Sciences ==
- Prestige (sociolinguistics), esteem in which languages or dialects are held
- Covert prestige – Sociolinguistic phenomenon
- Dual strategies theory, prestige as one of the two strategies for gaining status in human social hierarchies

== Other uses ==
- Prestige (horse)
- Prestige Elite, typeface
- Prestige format, square-bound printing format for some comic books
- Prestige oil spill, caused by the oil tanker's sinking in Spanish waters in 2002

== See also ==
- Select (disambiguation)
- Social status
