= Hector Davies Morgan =

British clergyman and author

- Born: Hector Davies Morgan; 1785; London, England
- Died: 23 December 1850 (aged 64–65); United Kingdom
- Occupations: Author, clergyman
- Known for: Theological writing

Academic background
- Education: Trinity College, Oxford

Academic work
- Discipline: Theology
- Website: biography.wales/article/s-MORG-DAV-1785

Hector Davies Morgan (1785 – 23 December 1850) was a Welsh-born British clergyman, theologian, and author. He is chiefly remembered for his theological writings on the history of the Church of England and for delivering the Bampton Lectures in 1819.

== Life ==
Morgan was born in London in 1785 into a Welsh-speaking family. He was the only son of Hector Davies and Sophia Davies. Upon the death of his grandfather in 1800, he succeeded to the name, arms, and estate of Morgan.

He was educated at Trinity College, Oxford, where he graduated with a Bachelor of Arts degree in 1806 and a Master of Arts degree in 1815.

Morgan died on 23 December 1850.

== Career ==
After taking Holy Orders, Morgan was appointed canon of Trallong. In 1819 he delivered the Bampton Lectures at the University of Oxford.

He authored a number of works in the fields of theology and ecclesiastical history, with a particular focus on the doctrine and discipline of the Church of England.

== Works ==
- A Compressed View of the Religious Principles and Practices of the Age
- The Doctrine and Law of Marriage, Adultery, and Divorce: Exhibiting a Theological and Practical View
- A Defence of the Clergy of the Church of England
- The Doctrine of Regeneration as Identified with Baptism
- The Expedience and Method of Providing Assurances

== See also ==
- Bampton Lectures
- Trinity College, Oxford
