= Peter McDonald (critic) =

- Born: 28 October 1962 (age 63); Belfast, Northern Ireland
- Occupations: Scholar, Poet, Critic.

Peter McDonald (born 28 October 1962, in Belfast) is a poet, university lecturer, and writer of literary criticism. He holds the post of Christopher Tower Student and Tutor in Poetry in the English Language at Christ Church, a college of the University of Oxford (and where the term "Student" is used for what elsewhere would be termed a "Fellow").

== Biography ==
McDonald was educated at Methodist College, Belfast, and University College, Oxford. He has been writing poetry since his teens, and was the winner of national young poet competitions in 1978 and 1979. His first published poems were collected in the book Trio Poetry 3 (Blackstaff Press, 1982), and he was publishing poems in the national literary press while still an undergraduate. In 1983, he won Oxford's Newdigate Prize for poetry, and from 1983-5 he was coeditor of the literary magazine Oxford Poetry. In 1986, he was selected as one of the six writers (including Jo Shapcott and Adam Thorpe) featured in New Chatto Poets. His first full collection of poems, Biting the Wax, was published in 1989.

McDonald has been a university teacher of English for many years. He was Fellow and Tutor in English at Pembroke College, Cambridge from 1988–92, and was Lecturer (subsequently Reader) in English at the University of Bristol from 1992-99. In 1999, he became the first holder of the Christopher Tower Studentship and Tutorship in Poetry in the English Language at Christ Church, Oxford, also holding a lectureship in the English Faculty of Oxford University.

In 1991, McDonald published Louis MacNeice: The Poet in his Contexts, and his critical and academic work on that poet has continued with his coedited Selected Plays of Louis MacNeice, and a number of articles; he has re-edited, for Faber and Faber, MacNeice's Collected Poems. More generally, he has been a prolific critic of modern and contemporary poetry, writing both for the national press in Britain and Ireland, and for poetry journals, such as Poetry Review, PN Review, Thumbscrew and Metre. His book Mistaken Identities: Poetry and Northern Ireland discusses poets such as Seamus Heaney, Michael Longley and Paul Muldoon. More recently, in Serious Poetry: Form and Authority from Yeats to Hill, he has challenged contemporary views of poetry and personality with new readings of Yeats, W. H. Auden, T. S. Eliot and Geoffrey Hill.

McDonald's second collection of poetry was Adam's Dream (1996); a third, Pastorals, was published by Carcanet in 2004; and a fourth, The House of Clay, appeared from Carcanet in 2007. He was elected a fellow of the English Association in 2005.

== Selected publications ==
=== Literary studies ===
- Louis MacNeice: The Poet in his Contexts (1991, Oxford UP, ISBN 0198117663)
- Mistaken Identities: Poetry and Northern Ireland (1998, Clarendon, ISBN 0198184220)
- Serious Poetry: Form and Authority from Yeats to Hill (2002, Clarendon, ISBN 9780199235803)

=== Poetry ===
- (with Johnston Kirkpatrick and Trevor McMahon) Trio Poetry 3, (1982, Blackstaff Press, ISBN 0856402761)
- Biting the Wax (1989, Bloodaxe, ISBN 1852240776)
- Adam's Dream (1996, Bloodaxe, ISBN 1852243333)
- Pastorals (2004, Carcanet, ISBN 1857547527)

=== As editor ===
- (with Alan Heuser) Selected Plays of Louis MacNeice (1993, Clarendon, ISBN 0198112459)
- (with Tim Kendall) Paul Muldoon: Critical Essays (2003, Liverpool UP, ISBN 9780853238782)
- Louis MacNeice: Collected Poems (2007, Faber, ISBN 9780571215744)
