= Antony Dunn =

English poet and dramatist

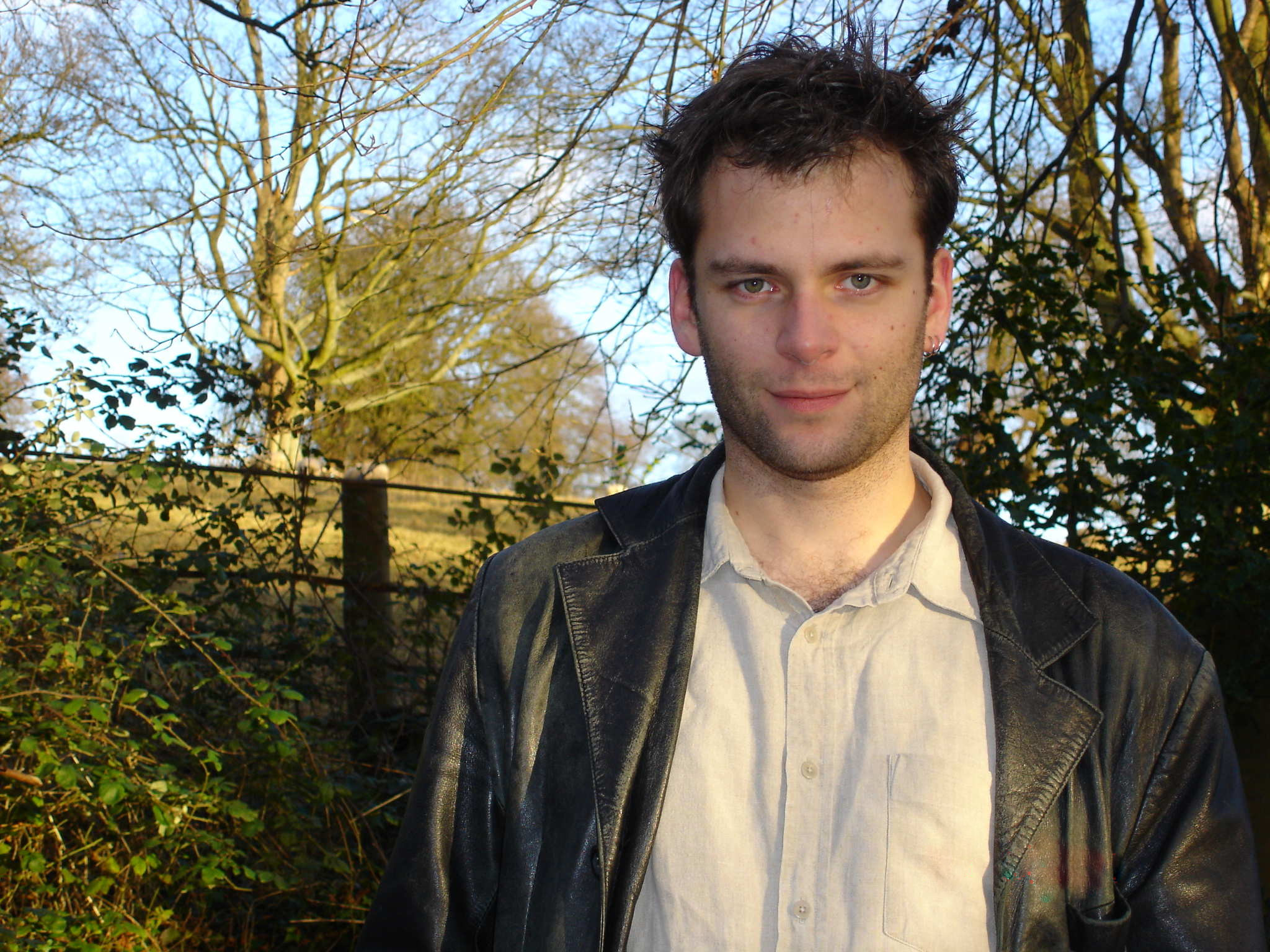
- Born: 26 June 1973 (age 53); London, England

Antony Dunn is an English poet and dramatist. He was born in London in 1973. He won the Newdigate Prize for Judith with the Head of Holofernes in 1995 and received a Society of Authors Eric Gregory Award in 2000. He has published four collections of poems, Pilots and Navigators (Oxford Poets 1998), Flying Fish (Carcanet OxfordPoets 2002), Bugs (Carcanet OxfordPoets 2009) and Take This One to Bed (Valley Press 2016).

He edited and introduced Ex Libris, a posthumous collection of poems by David Hughes (Valley Press 2015).

Antony Dunn was Poet in Residence at the University of York for 2006 and for the Ilkley Literature Festival in 2010.

His writing for theatre and film has included Goose Chase and Shepherds' Delight (both for Riding Lights Theatre Company), Timewarp 2000 (Barbican, York) and a screen adaption of Albert Camus' stageplay, Cross Purpose (First Man Productions). In 2006 he contributed lyrics to Mark Ravenhill's pantomime, Dick Whittington and His Cat (Barbican, London).
