= Isaac Gregory Smith =

British clergyman and author

- Born: Isaac Gregory Smith; November 21, 1826; Manchester, England
- Died: January 18, 1920 (aged 93); Woking, Surrey, England
- Occupations: author, clergyman
- Known for: authoring several books

Academic background
- Education: Trinity College, Oxford
- Website: www.hymntime.com/tch/bio/s/m/i/t/h/i/smith_ig.htm

Isaac Gregory Smith (November 21, 1826 – January 18, 1920) was a British clergyman, Anglican rector and author of several books on the history of Christianity.

== Biography ==
He was born on November 21, 1826, in Manchester, England.

He died on January 18, 1920, Woking, Surrey, England.

== Education ==
He was educated at Rugby School and Trinity College, Oxford.

== Career ==
After taking his Holy Orders, he was assigned to the rectory of Tedstone Delamere, Hertfordshire in 1854, and the vicarage of Great Malvern Priory in 1872.

He delivered the Bampton Lectures in 1873, his subject being The Characteristics of Christian Morality.

== Bibliography ==
He contributed several articles to the Dictionary of Christian Biography and Literature to the End of the Sixth Century.

He is the author of a number of notable books:

- Aristotelianism: The Ethics of Aristotle (1889) (via Internet Archive)
- The Silver Bells: An Allegory (1873) (via Internet Archive)
- Christian Monasticism From the Fourth to the Ninth Centuries of the Christian Era (1892) (via Internet Archive)
- Aristotelianism the Metaphysics, the Psychology, the Politics
- The Conscience Clause, can it be Justified? (1866) (via the Internet Archive)
- Practical Psychology (1911) (via Internet Archive)
- The life of our blessed Saviour : an epitome of the Gospel narrative arranged in order of time from the latest harmonies (1867) (via Internet Archive
- Boniface (1896) (via Internet Archive)

== See also ==
- Bampton Lectures
- Trinity College, Oxford
