= Masstige =

Marketing term

"Masstige" is a marketing term involving downward brand extension. The word is a portmanteau of the words mass and prestige and the concept has been described as "prestige for the masses".

The term was popularized by Michael Silverstein and Neil Fiske in their book Trading Up and in a Harvard Business Review article: "Luxury for the Masses". Masstige products are defined as "premium but attainable". There are two key tenets: (1) They are considered luxury or premium products and (2) They have price points that fill the gap between mid-market and super premium.

Silverstein and Fiske cite several examples in their 2009 study:

- Bath & Body Works Lotion that sells for $1.13 per ounce ($0.040/g) versus $0.30 per ounce ($0.011/g).
- Pottery Barn housewares that are considered premium but are widely available at attainable price points well below super premium brands.
- Kendall-Jackson Wines that entered the market at $5 per bottle versus the standard $2 per bottle.
- Porsche Boxster

Several other examples of masstige brand positioning were described in Truon, McColl, and Kitchen's 2009 paper , including:

- BMW 1 Series for $19,000 vs. traditional BMW sedans for $50,000
- Armani Jeans for $100 vs. Armani Haute Couture for $900
- Tag Heuer Formula 1 for $550 vs. Tag Heuer Link for $4,000

== History ==
According to the Oxford Dictionary Online, the term originated during the 1990s. It was then popularized in 2003 by Michael Silverstein and Neil Fiske in their book Trading Up and Harvard Business Review article "Luxury for the Masses".

A 2003 article "'Masstige' movement gains steam" characterizes the product trends for the health and beauty care industries with the term. Since 2003, the masstige marketing strategy has been used by many consumer goods brands to include attainable luxury level products.

== Masstige market positioning ==
A reasonable equilibrium between perceived prestige and price premium is critical to an effective masstige strategy. That is to say that masstige brand positioning for the consumer is to develop the brand as a premium, or reasonable level of perceived prestige yet whose price point is similar to middle-range brands.

New luxury brands are closer to traditional brands in terms of prestige, however in terms of price they are closer to middle range brands. Established brands command a premium at 3.1 times more expensive than new luxury brands (masstige positioning), and new luxury brands only sold for 2.2 times more than middle range brands. In terms of perceived prestige, the ratio of traditional luxury brands and new luxury brands was 1.14, while the ratio of new luxury brands and middle-range brands was 1.74. Those brands that employed masstige positioning strategy effectively differentiated themselves from middle range brands in terms of perceived prestige, and yet maintained a reasonable price premium to target middle range customers.

== Brand dilution ==
It has been suggested that luxury marketers thinking about developing their own masstige strategies should be aware of the possibility for brand dilution. To avoid this, it is suggested that adequate price premiums are maintained and access is limited to middle class consumers as brand dilution tends to occur when purchases from middle class consumers becomes frequent or habitual. The more available a product is the less prestigious its perception. Luxury marketers should also focus on developing a prestigious environment around the brand by advertising in glamorous magazines and prestigious stores, and holding seasonal fashion shows so that the brand appeals to consumers as an "aspirational" brand. During periods of economic downturn or consumer economic uncertainty, "aspirational" spending is one of the first categories to slow while spending on true luxury items shows little change.
