= Henry Soames (historian) =

English clergyman and ecclesiastical historian

- Born: 1785
- Died: 21 October 1860 (aged 74–75); Theydon Mount, England
- Education: B.A., Wadham College
- Occupations: Clergyman, historian

Henry Soames (1785 – 21 October 1860) was an English clergyman and ecclesiastical historian.

== Life ==
Soames was born in 1785, to Nathaniel Soames, shoemaker of Ludgate Street, London, he was educated at St. Paul's School and went to Wadham College, Oxford, matriculating on 21 February 1803. He graduated B.A. in 1807, M.A. in 1810. He held the post of assistant to the high master of St. Paul's School from 1809 to 1814, and took holy orders. In 1812, he was made rector of Shelley, Essex, and at this time, or later, rector of the neighbouring parish of Little Laver. From 1831 to 1839, he was vicar of Brent with Furneaux Pelham, Hertfordshire. In 1839, he became rector of Stapleford Tawney with Theydon Mount, Essex, where he remained till his death. He was Bampton lecturer in 1830, and was appointed chancellor of St. Paul's Cathedral by Bishop Charles James Blomfield in 1842. He died in Theydon Mount, on 21 October 1860.

== Works ==
Soames's major work in English church history addressed the Anglo-Saxon times and the sixteenth century. His works include, but are not limited to:

- A vindication of the Church and clergy of England from the misrepresentations of the Edinburgh Review (with Henry Brougham Brougham and Vaux, Baron), London, C. & J. Rivington, 1823.
- The History of the Reformation of the Church of England, 4 vols. 1826–8.
- Reasons for opposing the Romish claims, London : C.J.G. & F. Rivington, 1829.
- An Inquiry into the Doctrines of the Anglo-Saxon Church, Bampton Lectures Oxford, 1830.
- The substance of a speech delivered before the archdeacon and clergy of Essex at Brentwood on Thursday, April 25, 1833, upon the bill now before Parliament, respecting the Church of Ireland, London, Roake and Varty, 1833.
- The Anglo-Saxon Church: its History, Revenues, and General Character, London, 1835; 4th edit., revised, augmented, and corrected, 1856.
- Elizabethan Religious History, London, 1839.
- The Romish reaction and its present operation on the Church of England, London, John. W. Parker, 1843. (with Mrs Dixon Mary Ann; W H Dixon)
- The evils of innovation: a sermon preached at Romford, at the visitation of the Venerable Hugh Chambres Jones, M.A., archdeacon of Essex, on Monday, May 29, 1843, by Henry Soames,
- Mosheim's Institutes of Ecclesiastical History. … Edited, with additions, by James Murdock and H. Soames, 1841. This edition of the work of the Lutheran Johann Lorenz von Mosheim was re-edited in 1845, 1850, and finally by Bishop William Stubbs in 3 vols. in 1863.
- The Latin Church during Anglo-Saxon Times, London, 1848. This work was criticised by John David Chambers in Anglo-Saxonica; or Animadversions on some positions … maintained, &c. by H. Soames, London, London, Longman, Brown, Green, and Longmans, 1848.
- The Romish Decalogue, London, Longman, Brown, Green, and Longmans, 1852.
