= Newdigate Prize =

British poetry award

Sir Roger Newdigate's Prize, more commonly the Newdigate Prize, is awarded by the University of Oxford for the Best Composition in English verse by an undergraduate student. It was founded in 1806 as a memorial to Sir Roger Newdigate (1719–1806). The winning poem is announced at Encaenia. Instructions are published as follows: "The length of the poem is not to exceed 300 lines. The metre is not restricted to heroic couplets, but dramatic form of composition is not allowed."

== Overview ==
The first winner was John Wilson ("Christopher North"). Notable winners have included Robert Stephen Hawker, John Ruskin, Matthew Arnold, Laurence Binyon, Oscar Wilde, John Buchan, John Addington Symonds, James Laver, Donald Hall, James Fenton, P. M. Hubbard, and Alan Hollinghurst.

The parallel award given at the University of Cambridge is the Chancellor's Gold Medal.

== Past titles and winners ==
Where known, the title of the winning poem is given, followed by the name of the author. Each year links to its corresponding "[year] in poetry" article:

=== Notable 19th-century winners ===
- 1813: 'The Pantheon' Francis Hawkins
- 1827: 'Pompeii', Robert Stephen Hawker
- 1829: 'Voyages of Discovery to the Polar Regions', Thomas Legh Claughton
- 1830: 'The African Desert', George Kettilby Rickards
- 1834: 'The Hospice of St. Bernard', Joseph Arnould
- 1837: 'The Gypsies', Arthur Penrhyn Stanley
- 1838: 'The Exile of St. Helena', Joseph Henry Dart
- 1839: 'Salsette and Elephanta', John Ruskin
- 1843: 'Cromwell', Matthew Arnold
- 1844: 'Battle of the Nile', Joseph Lloyd Brereton
- 1845: 'Petra', John William Burgon
- 1852: 'The Feast of Belshazzar', Sir Edwin Arnold
- 1853: 'The Ruins of Egyptian Thebes', Samuel Harvey Reynolds
- 1857: 'The Temple of Janus', Philip Stanhope Worsley
- 1860: 'The Escorial', John Addington Symonds
- 1868: 'The Catacombs', John Alexander Stewart
- 1870: John Huntley Skrine
- 1875: 'David Livingstone', George Earle Buckle
- 1877: 'The Battle of Stamford Bridge', John Brooks
- 1878: 'Ravenna', Oscar Wilde
- 1880: 'Raleigh', Rennell Rodd
- 1883: 'Inez de Castro' John Bowyer Buchanan Nichols
- 1886: 'Savonarola', R. L. Gales
- 1887: 'Sakya-Muni: The Story of Buddha', Sidney A. Alexander
- 1888: 'Gordon in Africa', Arthur Waugh
- 1898: 'The Pilgrim Fathers', John Buchan
- 1890: 'Persephone', Laurence Binyon
- 1895: 'Montezuma', John Stanhope Arkwright
- 1900: 'Robespierre', Arthur Carré

=== 20th century ===
- 1901: 'Galileo', William Garrod
- 1902: 'Minos', Ernest Wodehouse
- 1903: not awarded
- 1904: 'Delphi', George Bell
- 1905: 'Garibaldi', Arthur R. Reade
- 1906: 'The Death of Shelley', Geoffrey Scott
- 1907: 'Camoens', Robert Cruttwell
- 1908: 'Holyrood', Julian Huxley
- 1909: 'Michelangelo', Frank Ashton-Gwatkin
- 1910: 'Atlantis', Charles Bewley
- 1911: 'Achilles', Roger Heath
- 1912: 'Richard I Before Jerusalem', William Chase Greene
- 1913: 'Oxford', Maurice Roy Ridley
- 1914: 'The Burial of Sophocles', Robert William Sterling
- 1915: not awarded
- 1916: 'Venice', Russell Green
- 1917: suspended due to war
- 1918: suspended due to war
- 1919: 'France', P. H. B. Lyon
- 1920: 'The Lake of Garda', George Johnstone
- 1921: 'Cervantes', James Laver
- 1922: 'Mount Everest', James Reid
- 1923: 'London', Christopher Scaife
- 1924: 'Michelangelo', Franklin McDuffee
- 1925: 'Byron', Edgar McInnis
- 1926: not awarded
- 1927: 'Julia, Daughter of Claudius', Gertrude Trevelyan
- 1928: 'The Mermaid Tavern', Angela Cave
- 1929: 'The Sands of Egypt', Phyllis Hartnoll
- 1930: 'Daedalus', Josephine Fielding
- 1931: 'Vanity Fair', Michael Balkwill
- 1932: 'Sir Walter Scott', Richard Hennings
- 1933: 'Ovid among the Goths', Philip Maitland Hubbard
- 1934: 'Fire', Edward Lowbury
- 1935: 'Canterbury', Allan Plowman
- 1936: 'Rain', David Winser
- 1937: 'The Man in the Moon', Margaret Stanley-Wrench
- 1938: 'Milton Blind', Michael Thwaites
- 1939: 'Dr Newman Revisits Oxford', Kenneth Kitchin
- 1940–1946: suspended due to war
- 1947: 'Nemesis', Merton Atkins
- 1948: 'Caesarion', Peter Way
- 1949: 'The Black Death', Peter Weitzman
- 1950: 'Eldorado', John Bayley
- 1951: 'The Queen of Sheba', Michael Hornyansky
- 1952: 'Exile', Donald Hall (published in OP 1953)
- 1953: not awarded
- 1954: not awarded
- 1955: 'Elegy for a Dead Clown', (Edwin) Stuart Evans
- 1956: 'The Deserted Altar', David Posner
- 1957: 'Leviathan', Robert James Maxwell
- 1958: 'The Earthly Paradise', Jon Stallworthy
- 1959: not awarded
- 1960: 'A Dialogue between Caliban and Ariel', John Fuller
- 1961: not awarded
- 1962: 'May Morning', Stanley Johnson
- 1963: not awarded
- 1964: 'Disease', James Hamilton-Paterson
- 1965: 'Fear', Peter Jay
- 1966: not awarded
- 1967: not awarded
- 1968: 'The Opening of Japan', James Fenton
- 1969: not awarded
- 1970: 'Instructions to a Painter', Charles Radice
- 1971: not awarded
- 1972: 'The Ancestral Face', Neil Rhodes
- 1973: 'The Wife's Tale', Christopher Mann
- 1974: 'Death of a Poet', Alan Hollinghurst
- 1975: 'Inland', Andrew Motion
- 1976: 'Hostages', David Winzar
- 1977: 'The Fool', Michael King
- 1978: not awarded
- 1979: not awarded
- 1980: 'Inflation', Simon Higginson
- 1981: not awarded
- 1982: 'Souvenirs', Gordon Wattles
- 1983: 'Triumphs', Peter McDonald (published in OP I.2)
- 1984: 'Fear', James Leader
- 1985: 'Magic', Robert Twigger
- 1986: 'An Epithalamion', William Morris
- 1987: 'Memoirs of Tiresias', Bruce Gibson; 'Palimpsest at Thebes' (Note: The set subject for this year was "Memoirs of Tiresias".), Michael Felix Suarez (joint winners)
- 1988: 'Elegy', Mark Wormald
- 1989: 'The House', Jane Griffiths
- 1990: 'Mapping', Roderick Clayton
- 1991: not awarded
- 1992: 'Green Thought', Fiona Sampson
- 1993: 'The Landing', Caron Röhsler
- 1994: 'Making Sense', James Merino
- 1995: 'Judith with the Head of Holofernes', Antony Dunn (published in OP IX.1)
- 1996: not awarded
- 1997: not awarded
- 1998: not awarded
- 1999: not awarded

=== 21st century ===
- 2000: 'A Book of Hours'.
- 2005: 'Lyons', Arina Patrikova
- 2006: 'BEE-POEMS', Paul Thomas Abbott
- 2007: Meirion Jordan
- 2008: 'Returning, 1945', Rachel Piercey
- 2009: 'Allotments', Arabella Currie
- 2010: 'The Mapmaker's Daughter', Lavinia Singer
- 2011: not awarded
- 2012: not awarded
- 2013: 'Edgelands', Daisy Syme-Taylor
- 2014: 'The Centrifuge', Andrew Wynn Owen
- 2015: not awarded
- 2016: 'Sinai', Mary Anne Clark
- 2017: 'Borderlines', Dominic Hand (published in Oxford Poetry XVII.i)
- 2018: not awarded
- 2019: not awarded
- 2020: 'the summer critter speaks not of frost' (夏蟲不可語冰), Rachel Ka Yin Leung
- 2021: 'Koinobionts', Annabelle Fuller
- 2022: 'pecking orders', Maggie Wang
- 2023: 'The girl I saw through the James Webb Telescope', Nicholas Stone
- 2024: ‘At the Papal Palace’ and ‘After “Horses, Peacefully Farting & Snoring” ’, Shaw Worth
- 2025: 'Jongleurs', Austin Spendlowe
- 2026: 'The Deposition of Harry Goodsir, Assistant Surgeon', Angus Barrett (Subject: 'Conversation')

== See also ==
- List of British literary awards
- List of literary awards
- List of poetry awards
- List of years in literature
- List of years in poetry
- Oxford Poetry
- Prizes named after people
