= Stuart Evans (author) =

Welsh novelist and poet (1934–1994)

Edwin Stuart Gomer Evans (20 October 1934 – 12 December 1994) was a Swansea-born Welsh novelist and poet, raised in Ystalyfera in Glamorgan.

He read English at Jesus College, Oxford, before serving in the Royal Navy. He then taught at Brunel College of Advanced Technology. From the mid-1960s, he was employed by BBC Radio, London, to produce programmes for the Schools Broadcasting Department.

His novels include Meritocrats (1974), The Gardens of the Casino (1976), The Caves of Alienation (1977), and the Windmill Hill Sequence of five novels which included Centres of Ritual, Occupational Debris, Temporary Hearths, Houses on the Site, and Seasonal Tribal Feasts. Prior to concentrating on novel writing, Evans had won the Newdigate Prize in 1955 for his poem "Elegy for a Dead Clown". He also published two collections of poetry, Imaginary Gardens with Real Toads (1972) and The Function of the Fool (1997). For his thrillers co-written with Kay Evans, he used the pseudonym Hugh Tracy.

Norman Shrapnel, in The Guardian, wrote of Evans' debut novel Meritocrats, that "I can scarcely recall a more ambitious first novel ... and few more interesting ones". Philip Howard, writing in The Times, described Evans as "my candidate for the Juvenal, I dare not say the Martial, of our generation." Peter Lewis, in The Times Literary Supplement, described Evans' Windmill Hill Sequence as "probably the most ambitious fictional work in progress by a British writer".

Until the late 2000s much of his work was out of print, but two of his poems were included in the anthology Poetry 1900–2000, published by the Library of Wales. The Library of Wales has also re-published his novel The Caves of Alienation, described by Anthony Brockway as "one of the most ambitious Welsh novels of the twentieth century". This is his most widely held book; according to WorldCat, it is held in 151 libraries. Evans was married to Kathleen Bridget Snelling, née Treacy (1932–1993), her second marriage.
