= John Huntley Skrine =

British historian

- Born: 3 April 1848; Bath, Somerset, England
- Died: 8 May 1923 (aged 75); Oxford, Oxfordshire, England
- Education: Corpus Christi College, Oxford
- Occupations: historian and author

John Huntley Skrine (3 Apr 1848 – 8 May 1923) was a British historian and author who wrote several bestselling books.

== Biography ==
He was born on 3 April 1848 in Bath, Somerset, England, United Kingdom.

He died on 8 May 1923 at age 75 in Oxford, Oxfordshire, England, United Kingdom.

== Education ==
He attended the Uppingham School and Corpus Christi College, Oxford.

== Career ==
He took Holy Orders and became a deacon in 1874, and a priest in 1876.

== Awards and honours ==
He won the Newdigate Prize for English Poetry in 1870.

== Bibliography ==
He is the author of a number of notable books:

- Sermons to pastors and masters
- Joan the maid, a dramatic romance
- Pastor agnorum : a schoolmaster's afterthoughts
- Uppingham by the Sea: A Narrative of the Year at Borth
- Georgicon liber secundus

== See also ==
- Newdigate Prize
- Corpus Christi College, Oxford
