= Partus Press =

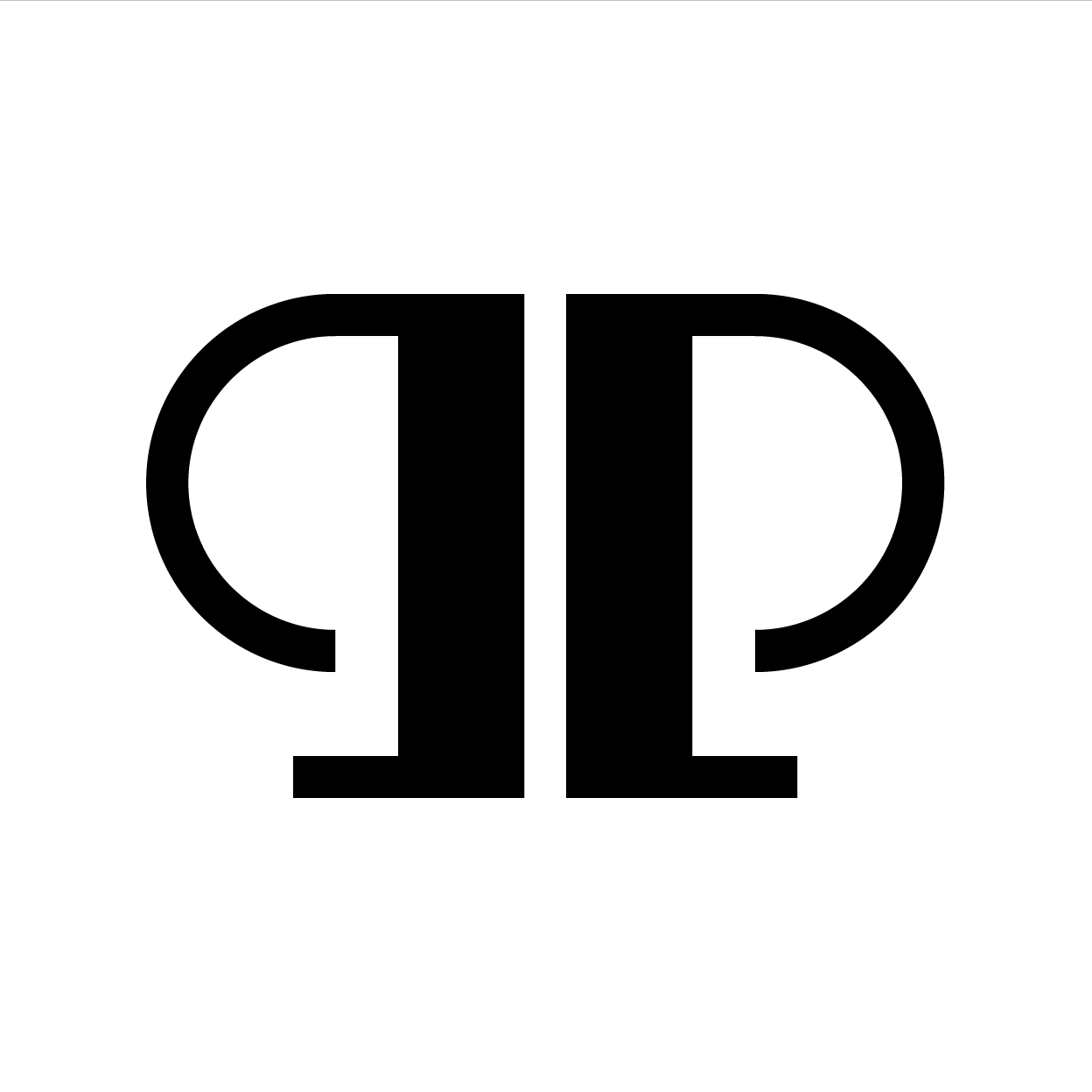
- Founder: Valgerður Þóroddsdóttir
- Country of origin: Iceland
- Official website: www.partuspress.com

Partus Press is an independent publisher based in Oxford, UK and founded by Icelandic poet Vala Thorodds (Valgerður Þóroddsdóttir). Partus Press publishes fiction, short-stories, and poetry.

Partus is a sister press to the Icelandic publisher Partus forlag which has published work by Elías Knörr (Elías Portela), Hallgrímur Helgason, Anton Helgi Jónsson, Sigurður Pálsson, Vilborg Dagbjartsdóttir, Halldóra K. Thoroddsen, Þorsteinn frá Hamri, Hermann Stefánsson, Kristín Ómarsdóttir, Ingibjörg Haraldsdóttir, and Bragi Ólafsson, among others.
