= William Finch (Bampton lecturer) =

English clergyman and lecturer

William Finch (1747 – 1810) was an English clergyman and Bampton lecturer in 1797.

== Life ==
Son of William Finch of Watford, Hertfordshire, he was born 22 July 1747. He entered Merchant Taylors' School in 1754, and was elected in 1764 to St John's College, Oxford. He graduated B.C.L. in 1770 and D.C.L. in 1775.

In 1797 he accepted the college living of Tackley, Oxfordshire, and in the same year was appointed Bampton lecturer. He took as his subject ‘The Objections of Infidel Historians and other writers against Christianity.’ The lectures were published in 1797, together with a sermon preached before the university on 18 October 1795. Finch, who also published a sermon preached before the Oxford Loyal Volunteers (Oxford, 1798), died 8 June 1810, and was buried at Tackley.
