= Kristín Ómarsdóttir =

Icelandic novelist, poet and playwright

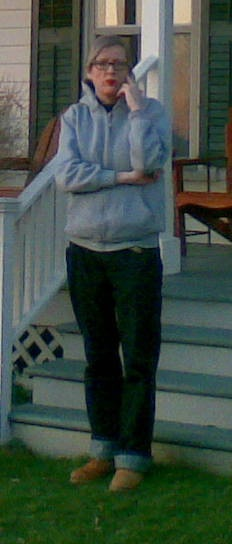
- Kristín Ómarsdóttir
- Born: 24 September 1962 (age 63); Reykjavík, Iceland
- Occupations: Poet; Novelist; Playwright

Kristín Ómarsdóttir (born 1962) is an Icelandic author, poet and playwright.

== Biography ==
Kristín Ómarsdóttir was born in Reykjavík; she spent her first years in Copenhagen and lived for most of her childhood in Hafnarfjörður. She wrote her first play in 1985, which won her first prize in a playwriting competition run by The National Theater of Iceland. In 2000, her novel Elskan mín ég dey was nominated for The Nordic Council Literature Prize. In 2005, she won Playwright of the Year at Gríman – The Icelandic Performing Arts Awards. For the poetry book Sjáðu fegurð þína she was awarded Fjöruverðlaunin – the Icelandic Women's Literary Prize in 2008. The poetry book Kóngulær in sýningargluggum, 2017, was nominated to Nordic Counsel Literature Prize in 2019. Her most recent novel translated to English is Swanfolk, published in UK and US in July 2022. In 2023 the first novel of a serial was published, Móðurást: Oddný; the novel tells of eight years old Oddný in 1871 rural Iceland. The second novel of the series, Móðurást: Draumþing, tells of Midsummernight when Oddný - the series's hero - turns fifteen. The novel got the Íslensku bókmenntaveðlaunin in literature for the year 2024.

== Bibliography ==
=== Novels and stories ===
- Móðurást: Oddný 2023
- Borg bróður míns, 2021
- Svanafólkið, 2019
- Flækingurinn, 2015
- Eternal Reflections ("Eilífar speglanir" 2013)
- Milla ("Milla"2012)
- We Belong to the Same Darkness: Marilyn Monroe and Greta Garbo, ("Við tilheyrum sama myrkrinu" 2011)
- By the Bridge ("Hjá brúnni" 2009)
- A Story of a Small Crybaby ("Saga af lítilli grenjuskjóðu" 2008)
- Children in Reindeer Woods ("Hér" 2004)
- Happiness I & II ("Hamingjan hjálpi mér I og II" 2001)
- My love I Die ("Elskan mín ég dey" 1997)
- The Narrow Doors ("Dyrnar þröngu" 1995)
- Black Wedding Dresses ("Svartir brúðarkjólar" 1991)
- Once Upon a Time Stories ("Einu sinni sögur" 1991)
- "On A Journey at Yours'' ("Í ferðalagi hjá þér" 1987)

=== Poetry ===
- KÓ, Ljóðasafn 2020
- Spiders in Display Windows ("Kóngulær í sýningargluggum" 2017)
- See Your Beauty ("Sjáðu fegurð þína" 2008)
- Christmas Poems ("Jólaljóð" 2006)
- In and Out the Window ("Inn og útum gluggann" 2003)
- A Special Day ("Sérstakur dagur" 2000)
- Close Your Eyes and Think of Me ("Lokaðu augunum og hugsaðu um mig" 1998)
- Waitress at an Old Restaurant ("þerna á gömlu veitingahúsi" 1993)
- There is Fog in Our House ("Í húsinu okkar er þoka" 1987)

=== Other books ===
- Audition, Gjöf til mín yðar hátign, Stars, 2014

=== Theatre and radio drama ===
- A Spider Sleeps in the Mirror ("Í speglingum sefur kónguló" 2011)
- The Big Mermaid ("Kuðungarnir" 2011)
- Short Stories ("Smásögur" 2007)
- The Hospital Ship ("Spítalaskipið" 2004)
- Tell Me Everything ("Segðu mér allt" 2004)
- My Friend the World's End ("Vinur minn heimsendir" 2003)
- The Birthday-Cake ("Afmælistertan" 2003)
- Many Women ("Margar konur" 2000)
- Margarethe the Great Radiodrama ("Margrét mikla útvarpsverk" 1999)
- Lovestory III ("Ástarsaga III" 1997)
- Margarethe the Great ("Margrét mikla" 1995)
- Trumpet of the Heart ("Hjartatrompet" 1990)
- Dreams Upside Down ("Draumar á hvolfi" 1987)

=== Exhibitions ===
- Audition (In collaboration with Gunnhildur Hauksdóttir, AceArtGallery, Winnipeg, Canada, 2008)
- Gjöf mín yðar hátign (In collaboration with Gunnhildur Hauksdóttir, Listasafn Así, Reykjavik, 2011)
- Stars (In collaboration with Gunnhildur Hauksdóttir, The Context Gallery, Derry, Northern Ireland, 2011)

== Translated works ==
=== Danish ===
- Billie og Rafael, Jensen & Dalgaard, 2015
- Omstrejferen, Jensen & Dalgaard, 2018

=== English ===
- "Swanfolk"

Harvill Secker, Harper Via Books, 2022

- Waitress in Fall, Carcanet Press & Partus Press, 2018
- Children in Reindeer Woods, Open Letter Books, 2012
- In and Out the Window
- Poems in Brushstrokes of Blue: The Young Poets of Iceland

=== Finnish ===
- Olipa kerran tarinoita, Like, 1994

=== French ===
- T´es pas la seule à être morte, Le Cavalier Bleu, 2003

=== Galician ===
- Meu amor, eu morro, rinoceronte, 2015

=== German ===
- Ewige Speigelungen, 2015

=== Swedish ===
- Här, Kabusa Böcker, 2007
- Gud hjälpe mig I och II, Kabusa Böcker, 2003
- Älskling jag dör, Anamma, 1999
