= Select (fashion chain) =

British fashion retailer

Select Fashion
- Company logo
- Type: Private limited
- Industry: Retail
- Founded: 1980s
- Area served: Worldwide
- Products: Clothing
- Website: selectfashion.co.uk

Select Fashion is a British fashion retailer with over 105 stores nationwide, owned by the Turkish entrepreneur Cafer Mahiroğlu. It was founded in the early 1980s and sells items such as clothing, accessories and footwear. The chain predominantly sells clothing aimed at 18- to 45-year-olds as well as children's clothing. The chain fell into administration in 2019.

== History ==
In 2004, the company formulated a plan to shift its image from being perceived solely as a 'value' ladies retailer to a more trend-setting brand. Select Fashion went into administration for the first time in 2008 and subsequently underwent a buyout. The chain encountered financial difficulties in 2019, leading to another administration and subsequent buyout.

In 2020, Select Fashion moved its head office from Kentish Town to Edmonton to expand its distribution center and develop its website. In October 2020, a group of garment factories located in Leicester, which had previously supplied products to retailers including Boohoo and Select, were found to be implicated in cases of money laundering and VAT fraud. There is no indication that Select Fashion was aware of the fraudulent activities taking place within its supply chain.
