= Theophilus Kwek =

Singaporean poet, editor, and critic

- Born: 1994 (age 31–32)
- Occupations: Poet, editor, and critic
- Writing career
- Language: English

Theophilus Kwek (born 1994) is a Singaporean poet, editor, and critic.

== Biography ==
After his pre-university studies at Raffles Institution in Singapore, Kwek read History and Politics at Merton College in Oxford University. After graduating in 2016, he went on to attain a Masters in Refugee and Forced Migration Studies from Oxford University.

== Literary career ==
Kwek began writing as a student at Raffles Institution under the mentorship of writers like Alvin Pang and Aaron Maniam. He has since published four poetry collections in Singapore and in the UK, namely They Speak Only Our Mother Tongue (2011), Circle Line (2013), Giving Ground (2016) and The First Five Storms (2017). His work has also appeared in both Singaporean and foreign-based journals, including The Irish Examiner, Southword, The London Magazine, The North, and the Quarterly Literary Review Singapore (QLRS).

His poetry second collection, Circle Line, was shortlisted for the 2014 Singapore Literature Prize. He went on to win the Martin Starkie Prize in 2014, the Jane Martin Prize in 2015, and the inaugural New Poets’ Prize in 2016. His translation of Wong Yoon Wah's poem "Moving House" won Second Place in the Stephen Spender Prize for Poetry in Translation in 2016.

Kwek's poems have been included in the Singapore A-Level literature syllabus. His long poem, Terezin, was performed at the 2016 Oxford New Writing Festival. The poem was also adapted as a chamber opera by Daniel Bonaventure Lim at the Performing the Jewish Archives project at the University of Leeds. He also wrote the libretto for This World Lousy, a musical by Peter Shepherd which premiered in Oxford in 2016.

Aside from writing poetry, Kwek is also an editor and critic. He served as President of the Oxford University Poetry Society, and is a Co-Editor of Oxford Poetry and Featured Editor of The Oxford Culture Review. He is also a Singapore Editor-at-Large for Asymptote, a Taiwan-based online literary journal. In 2016, Kwek co-founded The Kindling, an online poetry journal. Theophilus co-edited Flight, an anthology of poetry in response to the European refugee crisis, published by the Oxford Students’ Oxfam Group. Together with Singapore writers Joshua Ip and Tse Hao Guang, Kwek co-edited UnFree Verse (2017), an anthology of formal poetry in Singapore. Kwek's reviews and essays have appeared in The London Magazine, The Lonely Crowd, The Oxonian Review, The Oxford Culture Review, Mackerel, and QLRS.

== Works ==
=== Poetry collections ===
Year	Title	Publisher	ISBN	Ref
2011	They Speak Only Our Mother Tongue	Ethos Books	ISBN 9789810875350	
2013	Circle Line	Math Paper Press	ISBN 9789810722456	
2016	Giving Ground	Ethos Books	ISBN 9789810985998	
2016	The First Five Storms	Smith/Doorstop	ISBN 9781910367728	
2020	Moving House	Carcanet Press	ISBN 9781784109639	
2025	Commonwealth	Carcanet Press	ISBN 9781800174832	

=== Edited anthologies ===
Year	Title	Publisher	ISBN	Notes
2016	Flight: An Anthology of Poetry in Response to the Refugee Crisis	Oxford University Poetry Society, Oxford Student PEN & Oxford Students' Oxfam Group	N.A.	eds. Theophilus Kwek, Sarah Lyo, Benedict Gardner, Samuel Ilyas
2017	UnFree Verse: Singapore Poetry In Form	Ethos Books	ISBN 9789811137266	eds. Theophilus Kwek, Joshua Ip, Tse Hao Guang
