= Carmen Bugan =

Romanian-American poet and writer

Carmen Bugan (born 1970) is a Romanian-American poet and writer.

== Life and career ==
Her father was a critic of the Nicolae Ceaușescu regime; as a result of his persecution, the family migrated to the USA in 1989. Bugan studied at the University of Michigan (Ann Arbor) and Lancaster University. She obtained a PhD in English Literature at Balliol College, Oxford.

She has published several poetry collections, among them Crossing the Carpathians and The House of Straw. Her memoir of growing up in Romania, Burying the Typewriter: Childhood Under the Eye of the Secret Police, was critically acclaimed and was nominated for the Orwell Prize. She has also published a book on Seamus Heaney and East European poetry in translation. Her work has been widely anthologized and translated into multiple European languages, e.g. in the Italian-language volume On the Side of Forgetting/Sulla Soglia della Dimenticanza (Edizione Kolibris, 2015).

She has taught at Oxford University, University of Fribourg, and University of Michigan. She now teaches at the Gotham Writers Workshop in New York City and lives in Michigan with her children.

== Works ==
- Crossing the Carpathians (poetry, 2004)
- Seamus Heaney and East European Poetry in Translation: Poetics of Exile (critical study, 2013).
- The House of Straw (poetry, 2015)
- Burying the Typewriter (memoir, 2015)
- Releasing the Porcelain Birds (poetry, 2016)
- Lilies from America: New and Selected Poems (2019), Poetry Society Special Commendation
- Poetry and the Language of Oppression (essays, 2021)
- Time Being (poetry, 2022)
