= Thomas Dehany Bernard =

Thomas Dehany Bernard (1815–1904) was an English Anglican cleric, Bampton Lecturer in 1864. He was an evangelical interested in mission work.

== Life ==
The second son of Charles Bernard of Eden Estate, Jamaica, and his wife Margaret, daughter of John Baker of Waresley House, Worcestershire, he was born at Clifton, Bristol on 11 November 1815; Mountague Bernard was his brother. After private education he matriculated in December 1833 at Exeter College, Oxford, He graduated B.A. in 1838, when he won the Ellerton theological prize with an essay On the Conduct and Character of St. Peter. In 1839 he was awarded the chancellor's prize for an English essay on The Classical Taste and Character compared with the Romantic.

In 1840 Bernard was ordained deacon and licensed to the curacy of Great Baddow, Essex. Ordained priest in 1841, he succeeded to the vicarage of Great Baddow, where he remained until 1846. After working for a short time as curate of Harrow-on-the-Hill, he became in 1848 vicar of Terling, Essex. He showed more interest in foreign missions than many contemporaries. He was select preacher at Oxford in 1858, 1862, and 1882.

In 1864 Bernard was appointed by Charles Simeon's trustees to the rectory of Walcot, Bath, a reflection of his strong evangelical sympathies. He increased the church accommodation and built St. Andrew's church and schools. In 1867 Robert Eden, the bishop of Bath and Wells, collated him to a prebendal stall in Wells Cathedral; and next year the dean and chapter elected him to a residentiary canonry. He succeeded to the chancellorship of the cathedral in 1879, and from 1880 to 1895 represented the chapter in Convocation.

Bernard revived the cathedral grammar school, at his own cost provided buildings for it, and established a high school for girls. He was a frequent speaker at the Islington clerical meeting, He resigned Walcot in 1886, and went to live at Wimborne. In 1901 he retired from his canonry, retaining only the unpaid post of chancellor.

Bernard died at High Hall, Wimborne, on 7 December 1904.

== Works ==
In 1864 Bernard delivered Bampton lectures on The Progress of Doctrine in the New Testament (published, with a fifth edition in 1900). Other works were:

- Before His Presence with a Song, 1885; 2nd edition 1887.
- The Central Teaching of Jesus Christ, 1892.
- Songs of the Holy Nativity, 1895.
- The Word and Sacraments, 1904.

== Family ==
Bernard married in 1841 Caroline, daughter of Benjamin Linthorne, of High Hall, Wimborne; she died in 1881, leaving two sons and seven daughters.

== Notes ==
Attribution

This article incorporates text from a publication now in the public domain: Lee, Sidney, ed. (1912). "Bernard, Thomas Dehany". Dictionary of National Biography (2nd supplement). Vol. 1. London: Smith, Elder & Co.
