= Leonard Prestige =

English academic, theologian and divine (1889–1955)

The Reverend Leonard Prestige
- Born: George Leonard Prestige; 1889
- Died: 19 January 1955 (aged 65–66); London, England

Ecclesiastical career
- Church: Church of England
- Offices held: Canon Treasurer of St Paul's Cathedral

Academic work
- Discipline: Theology
- Sub-discipline: Patristics
- Institutions: New College, Oxford
- Notable works: Fathers and Heretics (1954)

George Leonard Prestige (1889–1955) was Fellow and Chaplain of New College, Oxford. His theological research showed particular competence in patristics and touched on ancient philosophy, e.g., in God in Patristic Thought (1936). He is perhaps best known for his illuminating and in places entertaining work, Fathers and Heretics (1954), given initially as Bampton Lectures in 1940. Prestige also wrote a biography of Charles Gore (1935) and St Paul's in Its Glory (1955).

From 1920 to 1944, Prestige held the country living of Upper Heyford, Oxfordshire. Many of his early books were written there. He was also deputy editor of the Church Times, succeeding as editor in 1941 and in the role until 1948.

In 1949 Prestige was secretary of the Church of England Council for Foreign Relations. He was also sent by Archbishop Geoffrey Fisher to Rome to explore avenues for ecumenical dialogue in the course of which he met with Giovanni Battista Montini, the future Pope Paul VI. Prestige died on 19 January 1955 in London. At his death Prestige was Canon Treasurer of St Paul's Cathedral.

== Bibliography ==
- The Virgin Birth of Our Lord (1918)
- Episcopacy (1923)
- Christian Verity (Anglo-Catholic Congress Committee, 1924)
- The Life of Charles Gore: A Great Englishman (London and Toronto: Heinemann, 1935)
- God in Patristic Thought (London: SPCK, 1936/1952)
- Fathers and Heretics: Six Studies in Dogmatic Faith with Prologue and Epilogue (1940/1984) Bampton Lectures
- St. Paul's in Its Glory: A Candid History of the Cathedral, 1831-1911 (London: St. Paul's Cathedral, 1955)
- St. Basil the Great and Apollinaris of Laodicea (London: SPCK, 1956)
- Pusey (London: Mowbray, 1982)
