= Select =

Select or SELECT may refer to:

== Arts, entertainment, and media ==
- Select (album), a 1982 album by Kim Wilde
- Select (magazine), a 1990–2001 British music magazine
- MTV Select, a 1996–2001 interactive television music program
- Select Live, a 2003—2010 New Zealand television music program
- Selects (album), a 2002 album by Zakir Hussain

== Television channels ==
- Carlton Select
- ITV Select

== Brands and enterprises ==
- Select (fashion chain), UK women's fashion/clothing retailer
- Select Citywalk, a shopping mall in Delhi, India
- Select Sport A/S, a Danish sports equipment manufacturer
- Select (aperitif), an Italian aperitif

== Technology ==
- Select (SQL), a keyword in SQL
- select (Unix), a system call (in sys/select.h or unistd.h) for polling multiple file descriptors
- <select></select>, an HTML element
- Cable select, a setting on Advanced Technology Attachment (ATA) devices that allows position on the cable to determine the role of a drive
- Quick select, an algorithm to select the k^{th}-smallest element of an array

== Other uses ==
- SELECT (Electrical Contractors' Association of Scotland)
- Selenium and Vitamin E Cancer Prevention Trial, a prostate cancer prevention trial

== See also ==
- Selection (disambiguation)
