= Thomas William Lancaster =

English churchman and academic

Thomas William Lancaster, M.A. (1787–1869) was an English churchman and academic, vicar of Banbury and fellow of Queen's College, Oxford.

== Life ==
He was born at Fulham, Middlesex, on 24 August 1787, son of the Rev. Thomas Lancaster of Wimbledon, Surrey. He matriculated at Oriel College, Oxford, 26 January 1804, and graduated B.A. (with a second class in lit. hum.) in 1807, and M.A. in 1810. In 1808, he was elected to a Michel scholarship at Queen's College, and in the following year to a fellowship on the same foundation.

After being ordained deacon in 1810 and priest in 1812, Lancaster became in the latter year curate of Banbury in Oxfordshire, and vicar of Banbury in 1815. He resigned his fellowship at Queen's on his marriage in 1816.

Lancaster's relations with his parishioners were not happy, and although he retained the living of Banbury for upwards of thirty-three years, he resided in Oxford about half that time. In 1849, the new bishop of Oxford, Samuel Wilberforce, induced him to exchange Banbury for the rectory of Over Worton, a small village near Woodstock. He did not find the new living more congenial than the old, and continued to reside in Oxford, where he frequented the Bodleian Library, and was respected for his learning.

In 1831, Lancaster preached the Bampton Lectures, taking for his subject "The Popular Evidence of Christianity." He was appointed a select preacher to the university in 1832, and a public examiner in 1832-3. From 1840 to 1849, he acted, with little success, as under-master (ostiarius, or usher) of Magdalen College school, and was for a time chaplain to the Dowager Countess of Guilford.

He was found dead in his bed at his lodgings in High Street, 12 December 1859, and was buried in the Holywell cemetery.

== Family ==
His wife, Miss Anne Walford of Banbury, died 8 February 1860, at the age of eighty-four. He had no family.

== Works ==
- The popular evidence of Christianity: stated and examined. 1831,
- Thomas William Lancaster (1848). Vindiciae Symbolicae: Or a Treatise on Creeds, Articles of Faith, and Articles of Doctrine. J. Vincent London: T. & J. Rivington.
- Aristotle (1884). Thomas William Lancaster (ed.). The Nicomachean Ethics of Aristotle. J. Vincent.
