= Selection =

Selection may refer to:

== Science ==
- Selection (biology), also called natural selection, selection in evolution
- Selection (linguistics), the ability of predicates to determine the semantic content of their arguments
- A selection, or choice function, a function that selects an element from a set

== Computing ==
- Selection (user interface)
- Selection (evolutionary algorithm)
- Selection (relational algebra)

== Other uses ==
- Preselection (or selection) of candidates in British elections
- Selection (Australian history), an area of crown land acquired under legislation
- Selection (album), by 54•40
- Selection (Nazi concentration camps)
- The Selection, a novel by Kiera Cass
- A store brand used by Metro Inc.

== See also ==
- Adverse selection
- Selection effect, a distortion of data arising from the way that the data are collected
- Selection-based search, a search engine system in which the user invokes a search query using only the mouse
- Selection algorithm, an algorithm that finds the kth smallest number in a list
- Selected (album), the compilation album by Recoil
- Select (disambiguation)
