= Image of God =

Doctrine in Judaism and Christianity

The "image of God" (Hebrew: צֶלֶם אֱלֹהִים, romanized: ṣelem ʾĔlōhīm; Greek: εἰκών τοῦ Θεοῦ, romanized: eikón toú Theoú; Latin: imago Dei) was originally a concept in Ancient Near Eastern thought, often applied to cult images, kings, and images representing kings. It was applied to all of humanity in the Hebrew Bible, becoming an important concept and theological doctrine in Judaism and Christianity. It is a foundational aspect of those religions' beliefs with regard to the fundamental understanding of human nature. It stems from the primary text in Genesis 1:27, which reads (in the King James Version): "So God created man in his own image, in the image of God created he him; male and female he created them." The exact meaning of the phrase has been debated for millennia.

Following tradition, a number of Jewish scholars, such as Saadia Gaon and Philo, argued that being made in the image of God does not mean that God possesses human-like features, but rather the reverse: that the statement is figurative language for God bestowing special honour unto humankind, which he did not confer unto the rest of creation.

The history of the Christian interpretation of the image of God has included three common lines of understanding: a substantive view locates the image of God in shared characteristics between God and humanity such as rationality or morality; a relational understanding argues that the image is found in human relationships with God and each other; and a functional view interprets the image of God as a role or function whereby humans act on God’s behalf and serve to represent God in the created order. These three views are not strictly competitive. Furthermore, a fourth and earlier viewpoint involved the physical, corporeal form of God, held by both Christians and Jews.

Doctrine associated with God's image provides important grounding for the development of human rights and the dignity of each human life regardless of class, race, gender, or disability, and it is also related to conversations about the human body's divinity and role in human life and salvation.

== Biblical sources ==
=== Hebrew Bible ===
The phrase "image of God" is found in three passages in the Hebrew Bible, all in the Book of Genesis 1–11:

And God said: 'Let us make man in our image/b'tsalmeinu, after our likeness/kid'muteinu; and let them have dominion over the fish of the sea, and over the fowl of the air, and over the cattle, and over all the earth, and over every creeping thing that creepeth upon the earth.' And God created man in His image, in the image of God He created him, male and female created He them. And God blessed them; and God said to them: 'Be fruitful, and multiply, and fill the earth, and subdue it; and have dominion over the fish of the sea, and over the fowl of the air, and over every living thing that creepeth upon the earth.'

— Genesis 1:26–28

This is the book of the generations of Adam. In the day that God created man, in the likeness of God made He him. Male and female created He them, and blessed them, and called their name Adam, in the day when they were created. And Adam lived a hundred and thirty years, and begot a son in his own likeness, after his image; and called his name Seth.

— Genesis 5:1–3

One who spills the blood of man, through/by man, his blood will be spilled, for in God's image/tselem He made man.

— Genesis 9:6

=== Apocrypha / Deuterocanonical books ===
In the Apocrypha or Deuterocanon, there are three passages that explicitly use "image" terminology to describe humanity.

For God created man to be immortal, and made him to be an image of his own eternity.

— Wisdom of Solomon 2:23

The Lord created man of the earth, and turned him into it again. He gave them few days, and a short time, and power also over the thing therein. He endued them with strength by themselves, and made them according to his image, And put the fear of man upon all flesh, and gave him dominion over beasts and fowls.

— Sirach 17:1–4

But people, who have been formed by your hands and are called your own image because they are made like you, and for whose sake you have formed all things – have you also made them like the farmer's seed?

— 2 Esdras 8:44

=== New Testament ===
The New Testament reflects on Christ as the image of God and humans both as images of God and Christ.

God, having in the past spoken to the fathers through the prophets at many times and in various ways, has at the end of these days spoken to us by his Son, whom he appointed heir of all things, through whom also he made the worlds. His Son is the radiance of his glory, the very image of his substance

— Hebrews 1:3

and transferred us into the Kingdom of the Son of his love; in whom we have our redemption, the forgiveness of our sins; who is the image of the invisible God, the firstborn of all creation.

— Colossians 1:13–15

And have put on the new man, which is renewed in knowledge after the image of him that created him.

— Colossians 3:10

For a man ought not to have his head covered, since he is God's image and glory; but the woman is the glory of the man.

— 1 Corinthians 11:7

"Because those whom He foreknew, He also predestinated to be conformed to the image of His Son, that He might be the Firstborn among many brothers";

— Romans 8:29

But we all with unveiled face, beholding and reflecting like a mirror the glory of the Lord, are being transformed into the same image from glory to glory, even as from the Lord Spirit.

— 2 Corinthians 3:18

that the light of the Gospel of the glory of Christ, who is the image of God, should not dawn on them. For we don't preach ourselves, but Christ Jesus as Lord, and ourselves as your servants for Jesus' sake; seeing it is God who said, "Light will shine out of darkness," who has shone in our hearts, to give the light of the knowledge of the glory of God in the face of Jesus Christ.

— 2 Corinthians 4:4–7

With the tongue we praise our Lord and Father, and with it we curse human beings, who have been made in God’s likeness.

— James 3:9

=== Interpretation of the Biblical texts ===
==== Image vs likeness ====
Theologians have examined the difference between the concepts of the "image of God" and the "likeness of God" in human nature. Origen for instance viewed the image of God as something given at creation, while the likeness of God as something bestowed upon a person at a later time.

While "image and likeness" is a Hebraism in which an idea is reinforced using two different words, a view arose that "image and likeness" were separate; the image was the human's natural resemblance to God, the power of reason and will, while the likeness was a donum superadditum—a divine gift added to basic human nature. This likeness consisted of the moral qualities of God, whereas the image involved the natural attributes of God. When Adam fell, he lost the likeness, but the image remained fully intact. Humanity as humanity was still complete, but the good and holy being was spoiled. The image of God and the likeness are similar, but at the same time they are different. The image is just that, mankind is made in the image of God, whereas the likeness is a spiritual attribute of the moral qualities of God.

However, the medieval distinction between the "image" and "likeness" of God has largely been abandoned by modern interpreters. According to C. John Collins, "Since about the time of the Reformation, scholars have recognized that this [image/likeness distinction] does not suit the text itself. First, there is no "and" joining "in our image" with "after our likeness." Second, Genesis 1:27 simply reads "in God's image"; and finally, in Genesis 5:1 God made man "in the likeness of God." The best explanation for these data is to say that "in the image" and "after the likeness" refer to the same thing, with each clarifying the other."

==== Specific nature of image ====
The primary biblical texts do not convey any specific ways in which the image of God is recognized in humanity. They do not speak about rationality, morality, emotions, free will, language, or any other similar statements. The words "image" and "likeness" simply carry the basic meaning that humans are like God and represent God. "Such an explanation is unnecessary, not only because the terms had clear meanings, but also because no such list could do justice to the subject: the text only needs to affirm that man is like God, and the rest of Scripture fills in more details to explain this." The various ways in which this is explored are found below in the discussions about substantive, relational, and functional understandings of the image of God.

Early theologians had much to say about the image of God. According to Origen, for example, the two pillars upon which the meaning of imago Dei is constructed and maintained are reason and virtue; thus, for Origen heavenly angels and humans both share in the divine image.

==== Progressive resemblance ====
Early Christians recognized that the image of God was perverted by sin. The Genesis 9 text, however, confirms that the image of God is not destroyed by sin, for the image remains in humanity after the fall and flood. Without compromising a commitment to the dignity of humanity as made in the image of God, the biblical texts point to the idea that the image of God can be developed and matured.

In Genesis 5, the image of God in humanity is correlated with the image of Adam in his son Seth. Commentators have reflected that the son better reflects the father as he matures and that while there may be physical comparisons there is also a resemblance in character traits. "The biblical text, by offering us this explanation, gives us the key that while humans are all in the image of God, they likewise have the capacity to become more and more in the image of God; that is, created with the potential to mirror divine attributes." This lines up with several of the New Testament texts which refer to "being renewed in knowledge" and "being conformed to the image". The idea is that through spiritual growth and understanding one can mature spiritually and become more like God and represent him better to others.

Humans differ from all other creatures because of the self-reflective, rational nature of human thought processes – their capacity for abstract, symbolic as well as concrete deliberation and decision-making. This capacity gives the human the possibility for self-actualization and participation in a sacred reality (cf. Acts 17:28). However, the creator granted the first true humans the free will necessary to reject a relationship with the creator that manifested itself in estrangement from God, as the narrative of the fall (Adam and Eve) exemplifies, thereby rejecting or repressing their spiritual and moral likeness to God. The ability and desire to love one's self and others, and therefore God, can become neglected and even opposed. The desire to repair the imago dei in one's life can be seen as a quest for wholeness, or one's "essential" self, as described and exemplified in Christ's life and teachings. According to Christian doctrine, Jesus acted to repair the relationship with the Creator and freely offers the resulting reconciliation as a gift.

==== Historical context ====
Scholars still debate the extent to which external cultures influenced the Old Testament writers and their ideas. Mesopotamian epics contain similar elements in their own stories, such as the resting of the deity after creation. Egyptian and Mesopotamian religions at the time contained anthropomorphic conceptions of their deities, and some scholars have seen this in Genesis's use of the word "image." King Tut's full name, Tutankhaten, translates to "living image of the Aten" (the solar disk). John Walton notes, however "the practice of kings setting up images of themselves in places where they want to establish their authority. Other than that, it is only other gods who are made in the image of gods. Thus, their traditions speak of sons being in the image of their fathers but not of human beings created in the image of God. For example, the Fakhariyah Inscription uses Aramaic cognate words for "image" and "likeness" in reference to the statue of a king from the north-eastern region of Syria during the 9th century BCE.

==== Moral implications ====
The Biblical texts sketch some moral implications of the image of God in humanity. The Genesis 9 passage links the image of God to the rationale for prohibiting and punishing murder. The James 3 passage also points out that the tongue which is made by God should not curse that which God has made in his image.

To assert that humans are created in the image of God may mean to recognize some special qualities of human nature which allow God to be made manifest in humans. For humans to have a conscious recognition of having been made in the image of God may mean that they are aware of being that part of the creation through whom God's plans and purposes best can be expressed and actualized; humans, in this way, can interact creatively with the rest of creation. The moral implications of the doctrine of Imago dei are apparent in the fact that, if humans are to love God, then humans must love other humans whom God has created (cf. John 13:35), as each is an expression of God. The human likeness to God can also be understood by contrasting it with that which does not image God, i.e., beings who are ostensibly without this spiritual self-awareness and the capacity for spiritual / moral reflection and growth.

==== In liturgical prayers ====
===== Jewish blessings =====
In Jewish liturgy, and especially in the Siddur, there is reference to being created in the divine image. For example, in the "Blessing for a New Day" (prayed at the beginning of Shabbat by Orthodox, Conservative, and other Jewish communities) there is this line:

בָּרוּךְ אַתָּה יהוה אֱלֹהֵינוּּ, מֶלֶך הָעוֹלָם שֶׁעָשַׂנִי בּֽצַלְמוֹ
(romanized: Bārûk̲ ʾattāh YHWH ʾĔlōhênû, melek̲ hāʿôlām šeʿāśanî bṣalmô.)
Blessed are You, LORD our God, King of the universe who made me in His image.

This blessing is a version of blessings mentioned in the Tosefta (Berakhot 6:18) and in the Babylonian Talmud (Menaḥot 43b). It is also found manuscript fragments found in the Cairo Genizah. Also, in expanding upon the ten commandments in prayer, this line exists:

לֹא חִּרְצָח כּלוּל בִּדְמוּת הוֹדִי
(romanized: Lōʾ ḥirṣāḥ klûl bid̲mût̲ hôd̲î.)
Do not murder those formed in my image / likeness.

Admittedly, the creation in God's image is not a prevalent or dominant theme in Jewish prayers, but the reference still exist.

===== Christian anaphoras =====
Many early Christian anaphoras make mention of the creation in the image of God when recounting the institution narrative. In a recent peer-reviewed article, Zakhary has argued that such anaphoras utilize image language to introduce the salvation narrative using parallel structure: the human made in the image of God in creation and God coming in human form in the incarnation. The Second Anaphora in the Armenian Liturgy of St. Basil and the anaphora in the Byzantine Liturgy of St. Basil even highlight the restoration of the image through the incarnation and the sharing in the glory of God. The Anaphora in the Liturgy of St. James also has a reference to the divine image:

You made humankind from the earth after your image and likeness, and granted them the enjoyment of paradise; and when they transgressed your commandment and fell, you did not despise or abandon them, for you are good, but you chastened them as a kindly father, you called them through the law, you taught them through the prophets.

Apostolic Constitution and the Anaphora in the Liturgy of St. Gregory the Theologian have an interesting link between image and authority, complementing Genesis 1:26, which references humanity’s dominion after creation in the Divine image. Apostolic Constitutions quotes Genesis 1:26 verbatim, while the Anaphora in the Liturgy of St. Gregory the Theologian uses the interesting phrase "You inscribed upon me the image of Your authority."

== Models for understanding the image of God ==
Christian theologians have often identified three common ways of understanding the manner in which humans exist in imago dei: Substantive, Relational and Functional.

Some Christian theologians have proposed Christology as the most important concept for interpreting the imago Dei, given New Testament equations of Christ with the image.

=== Substantive ===
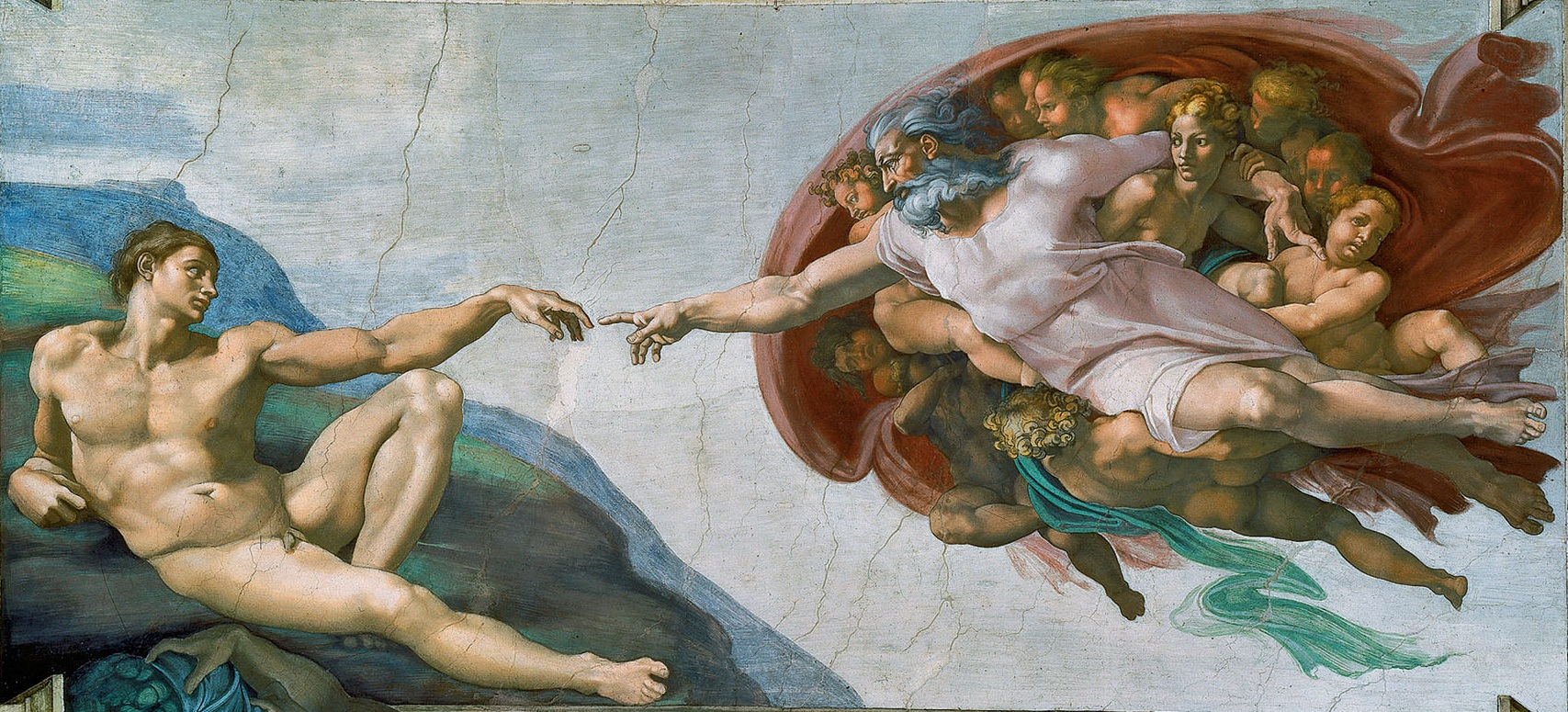
In "Creation of Adam," Michelangelo provides a great example of the substantive view of the image of God through the mirroring of the human and the divine.

The substantive view locates the image of God within the psychological or spiritual makeup of the human being. This view holds that there are similarities between humanity and God, thus emphasizing characteristics that are of shared substance between both parties. Some proponents of the substantive view uphold that the rational soul mirrors the divine. According to this mirroring, humanity is shaped like the way in which a sculpture or painting is in the image of the artist doing the sculpting or painting. While the substantive view locates the image of God in a characteristic or capacity unique to humanity, such as reason or will, the image may also be found in humanity's capacity to have a relationship with the divine. Unlike the relational view, humanity's capacity to have a relationship with the divine still locates the image of God in a characteristic or capacity that is unique to humanity and not the relationship itself. The substantive view, however, need not focus on a single specific way in which humanity is like God. It can apply to every way in which humanity is like God, just as Seth could be like his father Adam in multiple ways What is important is that the substantive view sees the image of God as present in humanity whether or not an individual person acknowledges the reality of the image.

==== History of Christian interpretations of the substantive view ====
===== Patristic interpretation of the substantive view =====
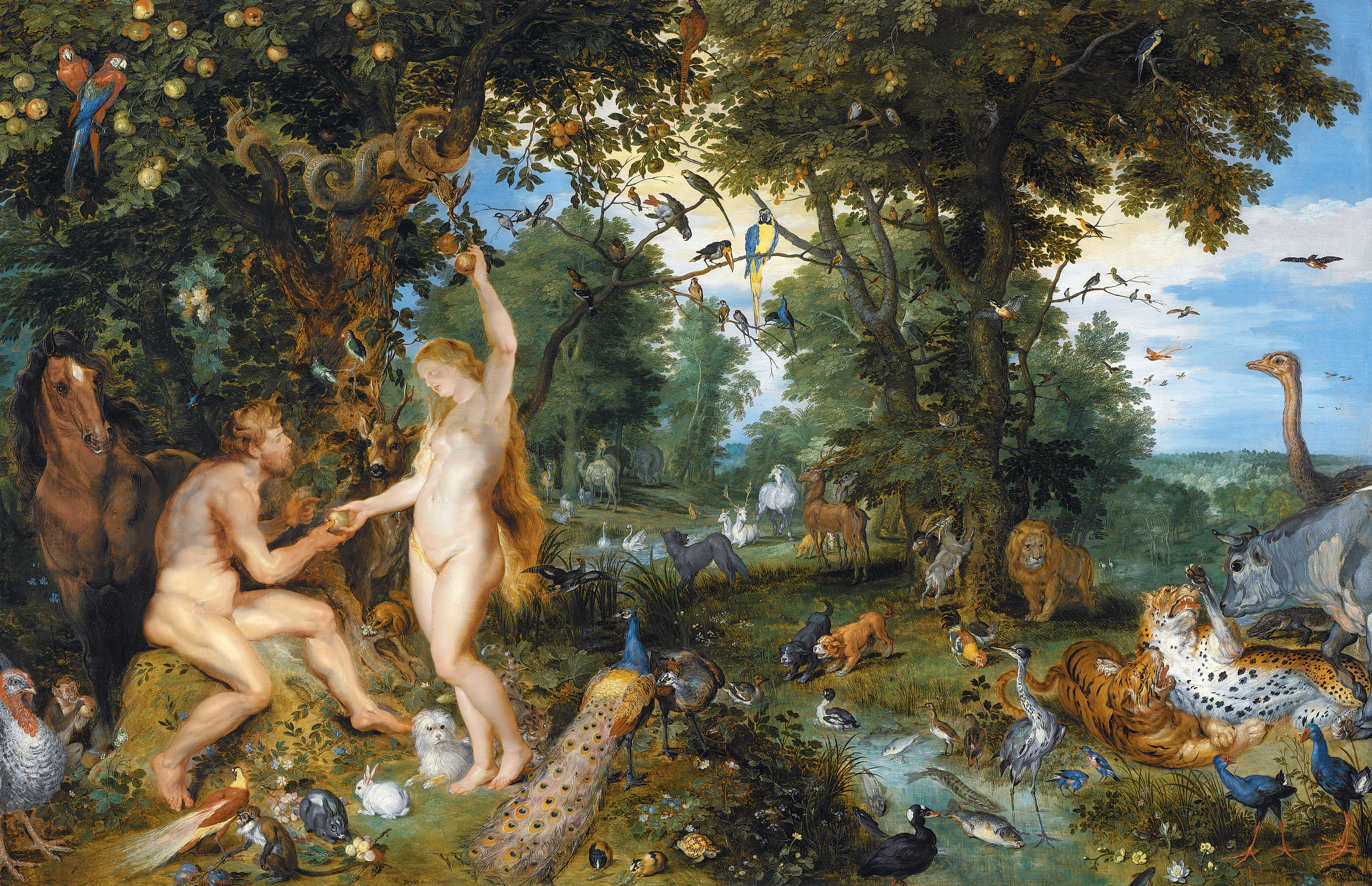
Issues surrounding "the fall" and "original sin" often became a crucial points of contention among Christian theologians seeking to understand the image of God.

The substantive view of the image of God has held particular historical precedence over the development of Christian Theology particularly among early Patristic Theologians (see Patristics), like Irenaeus and Augustine, and Medieval Theologians, like Aquinas. Irenaeus believes that the essential nature of humanity was not lost or corrupted by the fall, but the fulfillment of humanity's creation, namely freedom and life, was to be delayed until "the filling out the time of [Adam's] punishment." Humankind before the fall) was in the image of God through the ability to exercise free will and reason. And humans were in the likeness of God through an original spiritual endowment.

While Irenaeus represents an early assertion of the substantive view of the image of God, the specific understanding of the essence of the image of God is explained in great detail by Augustine, a fifth century theologian who describes a Trinitarian formula in the image of God. Augustine's Trinitarian structural definition of the image of God includes memory, intellect, and will. According to Augustine, "will […] unites those things which are held in the memory with those things which are thence impressed on the mind's eye in conception." The influence of Greco-Roman philosophy, particularly Neo-Platonic, is evident in Augustine's assertion that the human mind was the location of humanity, and thus the location of the image of God. Augustine believed that, since humanity reflects the nature of God, humanity must also reflect the Triune nature of God. Augustine's descriptions of memory, intellect, and will held a dominant theological foothold for a number of centuries in the development of Christian Theology.

===== Medieval interpretation of the substantive view =====
Medieval theologians also made a distinction between the image and likeness of God. The former referred to a natural, innate resemblance to God and the latter referred to the moral attributes (God's attributes) that were lost in the fall.

Aquinas, a medieval theologian writing almost 700 years after Augustine, builds on the Trinitarian structure of Augustine but takes the Trinitarian image of God to a different end. Like Irenaeus and Augustine, Aquinas locates the image of God in humanity's intellectual nature or reason, but Aquinas believes that the image of God is in humanity in three ways. First, which all humanity possess, the image of God is present in humanity's capacity for understanding and loving God, second, which only those who are justified possess, the image is present when humanity actually knows and loves God imperfectly, and thirdly, which only the blessed possess, the image is present when humanity knows and loves God perfectly. Aquinas, unlike Augustine, sees the image of God as present in humanity, but it is only through humanity's response to the image of God that the image is fully present and realized in humanity. Medieval scholars suggested that the holiness (or "wholeness") of humankind was lost after the fall, although free will and reason remained. John Calvin and Martin Luther agreed that something of the imago dei was lost at the fall but that fragments of it remained in some form or another, as Luther's Large Catechism article 114 states, "Man lost the image of God when he fell into sin."

The substantive view can also be seen in the Jewish scholar Maimonides who argues that it is consciousness and the ability to speak which is the "image of God;" both faculties which differentiate mankind from animals, and allow man to grasp abstract concepts and ideas that are not merely instinctual.

==== Rabbinic interpretation of the substantive view ====
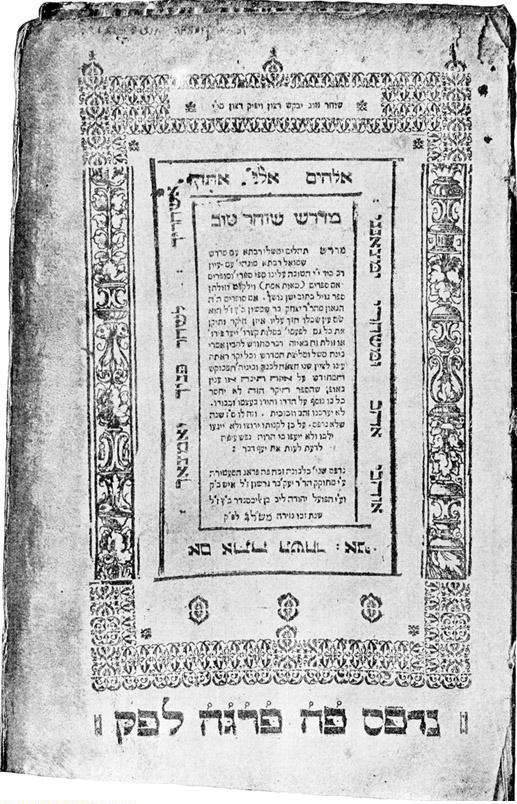
Hebrew Midrashim depict the image of God in democratic or universal terms.

Furthermore, rabbinic Midrash focuses on the function of image of God in kingship language. While a monarch is cast in the image or likeness of God to differentiate him ontologically from other mortals, Torah's B'reishit portrays the image as democratic: every human is cast in God's image and likeness. This leveling effectively embraces the substantive view and likens humankind to the earthly presence of God. Yet this immanent presence enjoys the ambiguity of midrashim; it is never outrightly characterized as "Godlike," as in ontologically equivalent to God, or merely "Godly," as in striving towards ontological equivalency.

The rabbinic substantive view does not operate out of the framework of original sin. In fact, the account of Adam and Eve disobeying God's mandate is neither expressly rendered as "sin" in B'reishit, nor anywhere else in Torah for that matter. It is instead likened to a "painful but necessary graduation from the innocence of childhood to the problem-laden world of living as morally responsible adults." That God fashions garments for Adam and Eve out of skins (Gen 3:21), is cited as proof of God's quickly fading anger. Midrashim, however, finds common ground with the Thomist view of humanity's response to the image of God in the stories of Cain and Abel filtered through the, "Book of Genealogies" (Gen 5:1-6:8). Insofar as the image and likeness of God is transmitted through the act of procreation, Cain and Abel provide examples of what constitutes adequate and inadequate response to the image, and how that image either becomes fully actualized or utterly forsaken. The murder of Abel is cast as preempting the perpetuation of the image through Cain’s potential descendants. This idea may be likened to the Christian idea of "original sin" in that one's transgression is seen to have grave unintended, or unforeseen, repercussions. Midrashim interprets Gen 4:10 as Abel's blood crying out not only to God, but also "against" Cain, which lays the onus squarely on Adam's firstborn.

=== Relational ===
The relational view argues that one must be in a relationship with God in order to possess the 'image' of God. Those who hold to the relational image agree that humankind possess the ability to reason as a substantive trait, but they argue that it is in a relationship with God that the true image is made evident. Later theologians like Karl Barth and Emil Brunner argue that it is man's ability to establish and maintain complex and intricate relationships that make him like God. For example, in humans the created order of male and female is intended to culminate in spiritual as well as physical unions Genesis 5:1–2, reflecting the nature and image of God. Since other creatures do not form such explicitly referential spiritual relationships, these theologians see this ability as uniquely representing the imago dei in humans.

For Severian of Gabala (AD 425) the Image of God does not refer to any human nature (corporeal and spiritual), but the relationship with God. "From this we learn that man is not the image of God because of his soul from him or because of his body from him. If that were the case, woman would be the image of God in exactly the same way as man, because she too has a soul and a body. What we are talking about here is not nature but a relationship. For just as God has nobody over him in all creation, so man has no one over him in the natural world. But a woman does she has man over her".

In the Modern Era, the Image of God was often related to the concept of "freedom" or "free will" and also relationality. Emil Brunner, a twentieth century Swiss Reformed theologian, wrote that "the formal aspect of human nature, as beings 'made in the image of God", denotes being as Subject, or freedom; it is this which differentiates humanity from the lower creation." He also sees the relationship between God and humanity as a defining part of what it means to be made in God's image.

Paul Ricoeur, a twentieth century French philosopher best known for combining phenomenological description with hermeneutics, argued that there is no defined meaning of the imago dei, or at the very least the author of Genesis 1 "certainly did not master at once all its implicit wealth of meaning." He went on to say that "In the very essence of the individual, in terms of its quality as a subject; the image of God, we believe, is the very personal and solitary power to think and to choose; it is interiority." He eventually concluded that the Image of God is best summed up as free will.

The Catechism of the Catholic Church states, " It is in Christ, "the image of the invisible God," that man has been created "in the image and likeness" of the Creator. Pope Benedict XVI wrote regarding imago dei, "Its nature as an image has to do with the fact that it goes beyond itself and manifests .…the dynamic that sets the human being in motion towards the totally Other. Hence it means the capacity for relationship; it is the human capacity for God."

=== Functional ===
The functional view interprets the image of God as a role in the created order, where humankind is a king or ruler over creation/the earth. This view, held by most modern Old Testament/Hebrew Bible scholars, developed with the rise of modern Biblical scholarship and is based on comparative Ancient Near Eastern studies. Archaeology discovered many texts where specific kings are exalted as "images" of their respective deities and rule based on divine mandate. There is some evidence that imago dei language appeared in many Mesopotamian and Near Eastern cultures where kings were often labeled as images of certain gods or deities and thus, retained certain abilities and responsibilities, such as leading certain cults. The functional approach states that Genesis 1 uses that common idea, but the role is broadened to all humanity who reflect the image through ruling the created order, specifically land and sea animals, according to the pattern of God who rules over the entire universe.

Reformation theologians, like Martin Luther, focused their reflections on the dominant role mankind had over all creation in the Garden of Eden before the fall of man. The imago dei, according to Luther, was the perfect existence of man and woman in the garden: all knowledge, wisdom and justice, and with peaceful and authoritative dominion over all created things in perpetuity. Luther breaks with Augustine of Hippo's widely accepted understanding that the image of God in man is internal; it is displayed in the trinity of the memory, intellect and will.

The twentieth and early twenty-first centuries saw the image of God being applied to various causes and ideas including ecology, disabilities, gender, and post/transhumanism. Often these were reactions against prevailing understandings of the imago dei, or situations in which the Biblical text was being misused in the opinion of some. While some would argue this is appropriate, J. Richard Middleton argued for a reassessment of the Biblical sources to better understand the original meaning before taking it out of context and applying it. Instead of various extra-biblical interpretations, he pushed for a royal-functional understanding, in which "the imago Dei designates the royal office or calling of human beings as God's representatives or agents in the world."

==== Ecological implications ====
The concept of dominion closely associated with functional interpretations has often been criticised as ecologically dangerous, supporting anthropocentrism and devaluing of non-human creation, most famously by Lynn White.

On the other hand, functional models have also become popular precisely among theologians concerned with ecology. Some theologians argue for ecological responsibility based on functional interpretations of the image of God as a call to be caregivers of creation (cf. Genesis 2:15). Thus, holding dominion over non-human creation is an imperative for responsible ecological action. Others suggest the imago Dei as dominion is secondary to a larger biblical theme of humankind as part of the "community of creation".

=== Christological ===
Some Christian theologians have proposed Christological theological anthropology as the key guide to interpreting the imago Dei. This can be articulated as an alternative model, or as the grounding and norm for understanding the imago through other models.

As noted above, New Testament texts using the language of God's image primarily focus on Jesus as being "the very image" of God (Hebrews 1:3), a stronger connection than biblical language of humans being made in the image of God (Genesis 1:26–28). This suggests Jesus Christ is the fullest and most complete example of humanity.

Kathryn Tanner suggests human imaging of God is analogical, taking its meaning from Christ's definitive imaging of God, to which it only partially corresponds. Grant Macaskill, endorsing Tanner's understanding, suggests "The implications for disabilities and disorders are massive, for now the only standard of normality that matters is [Christ's]," rather than any capacities that disabled people may lack. Correspondence and norming to Christ, Macaskill suggests, is accessible (partially and analogically) to all. Living in accordance with our creation in God's image, understood as Christ's image, can therefore be linked to union with Christ; new creation in Christ; being part of Christ's body; serving Christ in the least of these; following, imitating, and/or relating to Christ.

== In Islamic Theology (kalām) ==
The Quran, the sacred text in Islam, does not reiterate the concept of the "image of God". However, a statement reminiscent of Genesis is found in hadith. According to said hadith, God created Adam "in his image" (bi ṣūratihi). The Ash'arites, insisting that the Divine has no form, reject the similitude with God by stating that "his" refers to Adam. Atharis accept a plurality of attributes in God, but risks conceptualizing God as a finite being. The discussions in theology also led to various discussions in Sufism. One interpretation holds that the heavenly Adam is made "in God's image" so far, as he is able to reflect all of God's attributes like a mirror.

== Imago dei and human rights ==
The imago dei concept had a very strong influence on the modern conception of human rights, via various religious, philosophical, and political traditions.

=== Judaism ===
Judaism holds to the essential dignity of every human. One of the factors upon which this is based is an appeal to imago dei: "the astonishing assertion that God created human beings in God's own 'image.'" This insight, according to Rabbi David Wolpe, is "Judaism's greatest gift to the world." In the Midrash Mekhilta D'Rabi Ishmael, the First of the Ten Commandments is held in parallel with the Sixth Commandment: "I am the LORD your God," and "Do not murder." Harming a human is likened to attacking God. Genesis 9:6 also links the imago dei to prohibition of murder.

=== Medieval and modern Catholic natural law ===
An identifiable concept of human rights, also called natural rights, was developed by medieval Christian theologians and philosophers working in the natural law tradition. Like earlier Jewish and Christian thinkers since Philo, these scholars were influenced by the imago dei alongside Stoic and Platonic philosophical influences in rationally reflecting on human nature.

The natural law conception of human rights, chiefly via Catholic philosopher Jacques Maritain, was influential on the Universal Declaration of Human Rights. Due to the intention to establish universal support and honouring of human rights, the natural law grounding of human rights in human nature and common good, which is intelligible from multiple religious/cultural perspectives, has often been emphasised over the historical influence of particular religious traditions including the imago Dei.

=== Modern Protestant, political, and philosophical developments ===
Paralleling the Catholic natural law tradition, early modern Protestant philosophers and political activists also derived understandings of human rights from the imago Dei via natural law. This included John Locke and other Enlightenment thinkers. These Enlightenment understandings, in turn, significantly influenced modern Western ideas of human rights, both theological and secular, featuring prominently in the political discourse of the American Revolution and the French Revolution.

However, Glen Stassen argues that both the concept and the term human rights were present more than a half-century before Locke in Protestant thought. Imago dei in reference to religious liberty of all persons was used by the free churches (Dissenters) and radical political movements at the time of the English Civil War as an affirmation of the religious liberty and political equality of all persons. They based the concept not only on natural reason and the biblical concept but also on the Christian struggle for liberty, justice, and peace for all.

According to the scholar of Puritan literature William Haller, "the task of turning the statement of the law of nature into ringing declaration of the rights of man fell to Richard Overton." Richard Overton was a founding member of the Leveller movement, among the first major political movements animated by an understanding of human rights as belonging to all human persons. One of the themes that foreshadowed Richard Overton's reason for giving voice to human rights, especially the demand for separation of church and state, is implicitly connected to the concept of the image of God. This was expressed in the Confession of Faith (1612) by the Puritan group living in Amsterdam. "That as God created all men according to his image [...]. That the magistrate is not to force or compel men to this or that form of religion, or doctrine but to leave Christian religion free, to every man's conscience [...]."

=== An ecumenical proposal for human rights ===
Reformed theologian Jürgen Moltmann proposed an ecumenical basis for a concept of human rights using imago dei for the World Alliance of Reformed Churches in 1970. Moltmann understands humans as in a process of restoration toward the original imago Dei given in creation. Human rights entail whatever humans need in order to best act as God's divine representatives in the world. All human beings are created in God's image, rather than only a ruler or a king. Any concept of human rights will therefore include: first, democratic relationships when humans rule others, cooperation and fellowship with other humans, cooperation with the environment, and the responsibility for future generations of humans created in God's image.

== Imago dei and the physical body ==
Interpretation of the relationship between the imago dei and the physical body has undergone considerable change throughout the history of Jewish and Christian interpretation.

=== Old Testament scholarship ===
Old Testament scholars acknowledge that the Hebrew word for "image" in Genesis 1 (selem) often refers to an idol or physical image. While the physicality of the image may be of prime importance, because Ancient Israelites did not separate between the physical and spiritual within the person, it is appropriate to think of selem as originally incorporating both physical and spiritual components. Modern Christian commentators generally argue that the image of God is not related to physical appearance. John Walton writes "The Hebrew word selem (“image”) is a representative in physical form, not a representation of the physical appearance."

=== The Apostle Paul ===
The Apostle Paul at times displays both an appreciation for and a denial of the physical body as the image of God. An example of the importance of the physical body and the imago dei can be found in 2 Corinthians 4:4, in which Paul claims that Jesus Christ, in his entire being, is the image of God. Paul states that in proclaiming Jesus, the renewal of the image of God is experienced, not just eschatologically but also physically (cf. vv 10-12,16). In 2 Corinthians 4:10, Paul states that Christians are "always carrying the death of Jesus, so that the life of Jesus may also be made visible in our bodies." However, in v. 16 he states that though the external body is "wasting away," the inner being is renewed each day. In sum, for Paul it seems that being restored in Christ and inheriting the Image of God leads to an actual corporeal change. As one changes internally, so too does one's body change. Thus, the change affected by Jesus envelopes one's entire being, including one's body.

=== Hellenistic influence on Christian interpretation ===
Many theologians from the patristic period to the present have relied heavily on an Aristotelian structure of the human as an inherently "rational animal," set apart from other beings. This view was combined with Pre-Socratic notions of the "divine spark" of reason. Reason was thought to be equated with immortality, and the body with mortality. J. R. Middleton contends that Christian theologians have historically relied more on extra-biblical philosophical and theological sources than the Genesis text itself. This led to an exclusion of the body and a more dualistic understanding of the image found in dominant Christian theology.

=== Pseudepigrapha ===
2 Enoch details how humans are made in God's image—namely, as representations of God's "own face." Although it can be argued the reference to God's "own face" is a metaphor for God's likeness, the passage carries the usage of "face" forward by emphasizing what is done to the physical human face is, in turn, done to the face of the LORD—and, as is important for this writer, when one damages the face of another human being created in the very exact image of God's face, one damages God's face and will incur the expected consequences of such an offense.

2 Enoch 44:1–3: The Lord with his own two hands created mankind; and in a facsimile of his own face. Small and great the Lord created. Whoever insults a person's face insults the face of the Lord; whoever treats a person's face with repugnance treats the face of the Lord with repugnance. Whoever treats with contempt the face of any person treats the face of the Lord with contempt. (There is) anger and judgement (for) whoever spits on a person's face.

=== Irenaeus and the body ===
Irenaeus was unique for his time in that he places a great deal of emphasis on the physicality of the body and the image of God. In his Against Heresies, he writes "For by the hands of the Father, that is by the Son and the Holy Spirit, man, and not a part of man, was made in the likeness of God." For Irenaeus, the physical body is evident of the image of God. Further, because the Son is modeled after the Father, humans are likewise modeled after the Son and therefore bear a physical likeness to the Son. This implies that humans' likeness to God is revealed through embodied acts. Humans do not currently just exist in the pure image of God, because of the reality of sin. Irenaeus claims that one must "grow into" the likeness of God. This is done through knowingly and willingly acting through one's body. Because of sin, humans still require the Son's salvation, who is in the perfect image of God. Because humans are physical beings, their understanding of the fullness of the image of God did not become realized until the Son took physical form. Further, it is through the Son's physicality that he is able to properly instruct us on how to live and grow into the full image of God. Jesus, in becoming physically human, dying a human death, and then physically resurrected, "recapitulated," or fully revealed, what it means to be in the Image of God and therefore bears the full restoration of being in God's image. By so doing, Jesus becomes the new Adam and through the Holy Spirit restores the human race into its fullness.

=== Modern mystical interpretation ===
Throughout the 20th and 21st centuries, a small population of theologians and church leaders have emphasized a need to return to early monastic spirituality. Thomas Merton, Parker Palmer, Henri Nouwen, and Barbara Brown Taylor, among others, draw from aspects of mystical theology, central to the Christian desert ascetics, in order to provide theological frameworks which positively view the physical body and the natural world. For early mystics, the imago dei included the physical body as well as the whole of creation. Upon seeing a void in the development of Western theology, modern writers have begun drawing upon works of third century monks the desert mothers and fathers, as well as various gnostic systems, providing a more comprehensive view of the body in early Christian thought and reasons why modern theology should account for them.

=== Feminist interpretation ===
Similarly, feminist thinkers have drawn attention to the alienation of the female experience in Christian thought. For two millennia, the female body has only been recognized as a means to separate women from men and to categorize the female body as inferior and the masculine as normative. In an attempt to eliminate such prejudice, feminist scholars have argued that the body is critical for self-understanding and relating to the world. Furthermore, bodily phenomena typically associated with sin and taboo (e.g. menstruation), have been redeemed as essential pieces of the female experience relatable to spirituality. Feminism attempts to make meaning out of the entire bodily experience of humanity, not just females, and to reconcile historical prejudices by relating to God through other frameworks.

== Imago dei and disability ==
Consistent with the sense of the imago dei as grounding universal human rights, the imago' is often articulated as a powerful grounding for the value and rights of disabled people, equal to that of non-disabled people. There is widespread firm commitment to the idea the imago' must apply fully and equally to all persons.

However, when moving to explanations of what the imago means, all three of the commonly identified models of the imago Dei have faced a similar criticism regarding disability. Critics suggest that some or all formulations of a given model of the imago exclude disabled people, and thereby theologically support dehumanisation of disabled people. For example, it is suggested that on formulations of the social model that emphasise active agency and dominion, disabilities which interfere with one's capacity to "rule," whether physical, intellectual, or psychological, would distort the image of God. Some theologians even go so far as to state that animals would more fully display the Image of God than people with profound disabilities on such models.

The substantive model has been criticized for the same issue. The relational model has too, for example in reference to some autistic people not enacting the form of relationality posited as definitionally human in relational theological anthropologies.

Responding to these critiques of each model, theologians have agreed that formulations excluding disabled people must be rejected, but have argued that their preferred model, properly formulated, includes all of humankind equally, and indeed that it supports disability justice. For example, Richard Middleton articulates his functional understanding as "both a gift and a calling"; even someone with impaired abilities to act bears God's image as "a recipient of God's grace." Others defend relational understandings or propose Christological anthropology as better placed to conceived of the imago in disability-inclusive ways.

== Imago dei and transhumanism ==
=== Negative view of transhumanism ===
The understanding of imago dei has come under new scrutiny when held up against the movement of transhumanism which seeks to transform the human through technological means. Such transformation is achieved through pharmacological enhancement, genetic manipulation, nanotechnology, cybernetics, and computer simulation. Transhumanist thought is grounded in optimistic Enlightenment ideals which look forward to the Technological Singularity, a point at which humans engineer the next phase of human evolutionary development.

Transhumanism's assertion that the human being exist within the evolutionary processes and that humans should use their technological capabilities to intentionally accelerate these processes is an affront to some conceptions of imago dei within Christian tradition. In response, these traditions have erected boundaries in order to establish the appropriate use of transhumanistic technologies using the distinction between therapeutic and enhancement technologies. Therapeutic uses of technology such as cochlear implants, prosthetic limbs, and psychotropic drugs have become commonly accepted in religious circles as means of addressing human frailty. Nevertheless, these acceptable technologies can also be used to elevate human ability. Further, they correct the human form according to a constructed sense of normalcy. Thus the distinction between therapy and enhancement is ultimately questionable when addressing ethical dilemmas.

Human enhancement has come under heavy criticism from Christians; especially the Vatican which condemned enhancement as "radically immoral" stating that humans do not have full right over their biological form. Christians concerns of humans "playing God" are ultimately accusations of hubris, a criticism that pride leads to moral folly, and a theme which has been interpreted from the Genesis accounts of Adam and Eve and the Tower of Babel. In these stories, God was in no real danger of losing power; however, Patrick D. Hopkins has argued that, in light of technological advancement, the hubris critique is changing into a Promethean critique. According to Hopkins, "In Greek myth, when Prometheus stole fire, he actually stole something. He stole a power that previously only the gods had."

=== Positive view of transhumanism ===
Within progressive circles of Christian tradition transhumanism has not presented a threat but a positive challenge. Some theologians, such as Philip Hefner and Stephen Garner, have seen the transhumanist movement as a vehicle by which to re-imagine the imago dei. Many of these theologians follow in the footsteps of Donna Haraway's "Cyborg Manifesto". The manifesto explores the hybridity of the human condition through the metaphor of the cyborg. While the biological flesh/machine cyborg of pop culture is not a literal reality, Haraway uses this fictional metaphor to highlight the way that "all people within a technological society are cyborgs."

Building off of Haraway's thesis, Stephen Garner engages the apprehensive responses to the metaphor of the cyborg among popular culture. For Garner, these "narratives of apprehension" found in popular movies and television are produced by "conflicting ontologies of the person." The cyborg represents a crossing and blurring of boundaries that challenges preconceived notions of personal identity. Therefore, it is understandable that a person's first reaction to the image of a cyborg would be apprehension. For Garner, the wider scope of Haraway's "cultural cyborg" can be characterized by the term "hybridity". According to Elaine Graham, hybridity does not only problematize traditional conception of human as the image of God, but also makes terms like "natural" problematic. There is no longer a clear line between the old dualities of human/machine, human/environment, and technology/environment.

Brenda Brasher thinks that this revelation of the hybridity of human nature presents insurmountable problems for scripturally-based theological metaphors bound in "pastoral and agrarian imagery." Garner, however, sees a multitude of metaphors within Christian tradition and scripture that already speak to this reality. He identifies the three major areas of hybridity in Christianity as eschatology, Christology, and theological anthropology. In eschatology, Christians are called to be both in the world but not of the world. In Christology, Jesus Christ is a cyborg with both divine and human natures. Finally, in theological anthropology, the hybridity of human nature is seen in the concept of the image of God itself, since humans are both formed "from the dust" and stamped with the divine image.

== See also ==
- B'Tselem
- Be fruitful and multiply
- Christian humanism
- Human dignity
- Inward Light
- Self-expression values
- Theomorphism
