= St Hilda Professor of Catholic Social Thought and Practice =

The St Hilda Professor of Catholic Social Thought & Practice is a professorship or chair in the Department of Theology and Religion at Durham University. The chair is named after the St Hilda and was established in 2014, following a £2 million endowment being raised from various catholic organisations The holder of the St Hilda chair, alongside academic work, undertakes outreach work in Catholic Social Teaching. The position is one of many within the Centre for Catholic Studies (CCS) which was established in 2007. This is the first such teaching and research centre in Catholic theology located within a British University. The CCS is affiliated with the Centre for Social Thought and Practice which is a national network of likeminded groups.

The current St Hilda chair is Prof Anna Rowlands, who took up the appointment in 2017. In 2023 she was seconded to the Holy See to assist with the management of the Synod which will meet in Rome in 2023 and 2024. She is a frequent commentator on religious matters.

== List of St Hilda Professors ==
- Mark Gerard Hayes (2014 to 2016)
- Anna Rowlands (2017 to present)

== See also ==
- Durham University
- Van Mildert Professor of Divinity
- Lightfoot Professor of Divinity
- Bede Professor of Catholic Theology
