= Van Mildert Professor of Divinity =

The Van Mildert Professor of Divinity (formerly Professor of Divinity and Ecclesiastical History) is one of the oldest chairs at Durham University. The chair is named in honour of Bishop William Van Mildert, one of the founders of the university. The holder of the Van Mildert chair, which is jointly funded by the university and Durham Cathedral, is also a residentiary canon at the cathedral and member of its Chapter, thus one of the requirements of post holder is to be an Anglican priest or a minister in another church in communion with Church of England.

The current Van Mildert Professor of Divinity is Simon Oliver, who took up the appointment in 2015.

== History ==
The professor of divinity was one of the original chairs established at Durham University upon its foundation. The first holder, in 1833, was Hugh James Rose, one of the founders of the Oxford Movement and later the second Principal of King's College London, but he resigned the post due to ill health after only a year, with the duties being taken on by Henry Jenkyns, the professor of Greek, with the assistance of Temple Chevallier, professor of mathematics, from 1835. In 1839, the third prebendal stall at Durham Cathedral became vacant; this was attached to the chair of divinity (an arrangement made permanent by an Order in Council in 1841), allowing Jenkyns to resign the chair of Greek and take up the canonry and the professorship of divinity. However, when Jenkyns resigned the professorship in 1864 he did not resign the stall, thus Adam Storey Farrar did not take up the canonry until Jenkyns' death in 1878.

The chair of divinity was named the Van Mildert Professor of Divinity in 1943, during Michael Ramsey's tenure, when a second chair in divinity, the Lightfoot Professor of Divinity, was created.

== List of Van Mildert professors ==
- The Rev Hugh James Rose (1833–1834)
- Vacant (1835-1838)
- The Rev Canon Professor Henry Jenkyns (1839-1864)
- The Rev Canon Professor Adam Storey Farrar (1864 - 1905)
- The Rev Canon Professor Richard Knowling (1905-1919)
- The Rev Canon Professor D. Dawson-Walker (1919 – 1934); former Principal of St John's College, Durham
- The Rev Canon Professor Oliver Chase Quick (1934 - 1939), later Regius Professor of Divinity at Oxford
- The Rev Canon Professor Michael Ramsey (1940 – 1950), later Archbishop of Canterbury
- The Rev Canon Professor Stanley Lawrence Greenslade (1950 – 1958)
- The Rev Canon Professor Henry Ernest William 'Hugh' Turner (1958 – 73)
- The Rt Rev Professor Stephen Sykes (1974 – 1985)
- The Rev Canon Professor Daniel W. Hardy (1986 – 1990)
- The Rev Canon Professor David Brown FBA, FRSE (1990 – 2007)
- The Rev Canon Mark McIntosh (2009 – 2014)
- The Rev Canon Professor Simon Oliver (2015 – present)

== See also ==
- Lightfoot Professor of Divinity
- Bede Professor of Catholic Theology
- St Hilda Professor of Catholic Social Thought & Practice
