= Christopher Evans (theologian) =

English Anglican priest and theologian (1909–2012)

The Reverend Christopher Evans FBA
- Born: Christopher Francis Evans; 7 November 1909; Birmingham, England
- Died: 30 July 2012 (aged 102); Solihull, England
- Spouse: Elna Pasco (m. 1941; died 1980)

Ecclesiastical career
- Religion: Christianity (Anglican)
- Church: Church of England
- Ordained: 1934 (deacon); 1935 (priest)

Academic background
- Education: Corpus Christi College, Cambridge
- Influences: Sir Edwyn Hoskyns; Alec Vidler

Academic work
- Discipline: Biblical studies; theology
- Sub-discipline: Biblical theology; New Testament studies
- Institutions: Corpus Christi College, Oxford; Durham University; King's College, London
- Influenced: Tom Baker; John Bowden; Robin Gill; Dennis Nineham

Christopher Francis Evans FBA (7 November 1909 – 30 July 2012) was an English Anglican priest and theologian who became known as an authority on the New Testament. He also served as lecturer in theology at Corpus Christi College at the University of Oxford from 1948 to 1958 and was later made an Emeritus Fellow.

== Early life and education ==
Born in Small Heath, Birmingham, on 7 November 1909, to businessman Frank Evans and his wife Beatrice, Evans attended King Edward's School, renowned for its track record of producing theologians and Christian leaders, such as Edward Benson, once Archbishop of Canterbury. His classmates at the school at the time included the future Conservative MP Enoch Powell. After gaining a scholarship at Corpus Christi College, Cambridge, he became influenced by Sir Edwyn Clement Hoskyns who encouraged emphasis on literary forms used in the Bible, including songs, proverbs and stories. He graduated in 1932 with first-class honours. He later spent a year being taught by Michael Ramsey at Lincoln Theological College before serving four years in parochial ministry in Southampton.

== Career in theology ==
Evans returned to the college in Lincoln in 1938 as a member of the teaching staff. The institute struggled during the Second World War, with a reduction of pupil intakes, as well as interference of bombers in the nearby airspace. After six years at the college, he was offered a role by the Bishop of Lincoln at a teacher-training college in the chaplaincy, a role which he would fill for a term of four years.

In 1948, he was elected as both a fellow and tutor of Corpus Christi College, Oxford, where he would soon become renowned for his tutoring in teachings of the New Testament beside the likes of J. R. Porter and Dennis Nineham. On 16 February 1956 he spoke at the Oxford Socratic Club along with the philosopher Basil Mitchell on "Mythology in the New Testament".

After a decade at Corpus, he was appointed to Lightfoot Professorship of Divinity at Durham, but upon failing to settle in the city, he moved back south in 1962. For 15 years he taught as professor of New Testament studies at King's College London before retiring in 1977 to the village of Cuddesdon, Oxfordshire.

== Personal life ==
In 1941, Evans married Elna Pasco. The couple remained together until Elna's death in 1980. They had one son, Jonathan, who later followed his father into holy orders.

Evans struggled to come to terms with the death of his wife, despite living for a further 32 years. At the age of 98, Evans was asked about his age over a pub lunch, where he was quoted to have responded "Part of you feels that you shouldn't be here." He celebrated his 100th birthday at Corpus Christi College, Oxford, in 2009.

Evans died in Solihull on 30 July 2012, at the age of 102 and was survived by his son.

Academic offices
Preceded by Hugh Turner	Lightfoot Professor of Divinity; 1959–1962	Succeeded by Richard Hanson
