= Martin Hengel =

German biblical scholar and historian of religion (1926-2009)

- Born: 14 December 1926; Reutlingen, Württemberg, Weimar Germany
- Died: 2 July 2009 (aged 82); Tübingen, Germany

Academic background
- Education: University of Heidelberg; University of Tübingen

Academic work
- Discipline: Biblical studies Christian theology History of religion
- Sub-discipline: New Testament studies Second Temple Judaism
- Institutions: University of Erlangen; University of Tübingen
- Main interests: Ancient Judaism; Early Christianity; Hellenistic period Second Temple period

Martin Hengel (14 December 1926 – 2 July 2009) was a German historian of religion, New Testament scholar, and Lutheran theologian, focusing on the Second Temple period and Hellenistic period of ancient Judaism and early Christianity.

== Early life ==
Hengel was born in 1926 in Reutlingen, south of Stuttgart, at the time part of the Free People's State of Württemberg, Weimar Republic, and grew up in nearby Aalen. In 1943 he was conscripted as a 17-year-old schoolboy into the Wehrmacht and served in an anti-aircraft battery on the Western Front. In 1945, after one of the final battles of World War II, he threw away his weapons and uniform and walked home from France, completing his schooling in 1946.

In late 1947, Hengel began his studies in Christian theology at the University of Tübingen, moving to the University of Heidelberg in 1949. In 1951, he qualified as a Lutheran parish minister but in 1954 his father voiced his opposition to his ecclesiastical career, and insisted that he join "Hengella", the family's textile business in Aalen. This caused a ten-year struggle for Hengel, who had to study when he could based around his working hours. However, he remained director of the company until his death. In August 1957, he married Marianne Kistler. Hengel died at the age of 82 in Tübingen, Germany.

His Institute for Ancient Judaism and Hellenistic Religion attracted scholars from all over the world, including Israel, and the Philip Melanchthon Foundation, which he founded, brought young scholars close to the world of Greek and Roman antiquity. He received honorary doctorates from the universities of Uppsala, St Andrews, Cambridge, Durham, Strasbourg, and Dublin. He was a corresponding member of the British Academy and the Royal Netherlands Academy of Arts and Sciences.

== Career ==
For a short period he was also able to lecture at a theological college, and served as an assistant to his professor Otto Michel in Tübingen, but this ended in 1957 when he was sent to manage a factory in Leicester for several years. He continued to work on his doctoral thesis in his spare time. Hengel graduated in 1959 with a Ph.D. He completed his postgraduate work on his Habilitation thesis, a requirement for academic teaching, at the University of Tübingen in 1967. His thesis was concerned with Second Temple Judaism and Hellenism. He was a professor at the University of Erlangen starting in 1968. In 1972, Hengel returned to Tübingen to succeed Michel as a professor.

Recognized as one of the greatest theological scholars of his time, Martin Hengel focused a great amount of his studies upon the New Testament as well as other theological writings of early Christianity. Hengel specialized in the early period of Rabbinic Judaism, including early Christianity and the origins of Christianity. Throughout his writings, Hengel openly recognizes the challenges involved in developing a thorough history of early Christianity. Due to the fact that the sources available to scholars are often found surviving in fragments, as a result, "the sparseness of the sources vitiates our knowledge of large areas of the ancient world". In his article "Raising the Bar: A daring proposal for the future of evangelical New Testament scholarship", Hengel therefore challenges scholars to delve into more extensive biblical research to ensure proper understandings of the texts being established. Hengel's Christology strove to share an accurate illumination of who Jesus was and what he did and sought after as well as the notion that "Christianity emerged completely from within Judaism". After his experience as a soldier in the Second World War, Hengel said:

As for these specific errors that have affected my own country, today one may say that among the most important insights of our field of study since the Second World War belongs the recognition of how deeply rooted earliest Christianity is in Judaism as its native soil. This implies that the study of the pre-Christian Judaism of the Hellenistic period as a whole, that is, from the fourth century BCE on, is to be included in our field of study. Here Old and New Testament scholars must work hand in hand.

Not only did Hengel desire that scholars "work hand in hand" but also was known for supporting scholars of all backgrounds. In 1992, he was Emeritus Professor of New Testament and Early Judaism at the University of Tübingen. Within his studies of Rabbinic Judaism and the origins of Christianity, Hengel explored the perceived dichotomy between Judaism and Hellenism. In his study, Judentum und Hellenismus, he documented that the designation of Paul the Apostle exclusively as either Jewish or Hellenistic is a misunderstanding. Hengel argues in his writings that despite Paul's controversial rhetoric scholars, along with Jewish and Christian communities, must recognize the historical value of Paul's epistles and Luke's account of Paul's life within the Acts of the Apostles. Hengel recognizes the importance of this awareness because of the multifaceted insight provided about the Second Temple period and Hellenistic Judaism of the 1st century within these texts.

A large portion of Hengel's research on the Acts of the Apostles, focuses on the time in which Paul the Apostle spends between his time in Damascus and Antioch coining these years as "the unknown years". Between Acts and the letters of Paul, Hengel, among other scholars, attempts to piece together the extent of the missionary work of Paul the apostle. Hengel highlights Paul as an "apostle to all nations" (Rom 11:13) throughout his interpretations. He also highlights the miracle of the preservation of the letters of Paul and acknowledges, in correlation with the book of Acts (which set the letters within a historical context), we receive the "nucleus of quite a new form of theological writing in earliest Christianity… and thus also for the New Testament canon". He considered the traditional account that the Gospel of Mark was written by Peter's interpreter (John Mark, also known as Mark the Evangelist) to be essentially credible. He also believed that Luke the Evangelist was the companion of Paul's travels and author of the Gospel of Luke and the Acts of the Apostles.

== Works ==
- Hengel, Martin (1973). Judentum und Hellenismus: Studien zu ihrer Begegnung unter Berücksichtigung Palästinas bis zur Mitte des 2 Jh.s v.Chr (in German). Tubingen: J.C.B. Mohr.
- ——— (1973). Victory over violence, Jesus and the revolutionist, Philadelphia, PA: Fortress Press (translated by David E. Green)
- ——— (1974). Property and Riches in the Early Church (1st English ed.). London: SCM Press (translated by John Bowden).
- ——— (1974). Judaism and Hellenism : Studies in Their Encounter in Palestine During the Early Hellenistic Period (1st English ed.). London: SCM Press.
- ——— (1976) The Son of God, The origin of Christology and the history of Jewish-Hellenistic Religion: Philadelphia, PA: Fortress Press (translated by John Bowden)
- ——— (1977) Christ and Power. Philadelphia, PA: Fortress Press (translated by Everett R. Kalin)
- ——— (1977). Crucifixion in the Ancient World and the Folly of the Message of the Cross. Philadelphia, PA: Fortress Press.
- ——— (1979). Acts and the History of Earliest Christianity. London: SCM Press.
- ——— (1980). Jews, Greeks, and Barbarians: Aspects of the Hellenization of Judaism in the Pre-Christian Period (1st American ed.). Philadelphia, PA: Fortress Press.
- ——— (1981). The Charismatic Leader and His Followers (1st English ed.). New York, NY: The Crossroad Publishing Company.
- ——— (1981). The Atonement: The Origins of the Doctrine in the New Testament. Philadelphia, PA: Fortress Press.
- ——— (1983). Between Jesus and Paul: Studies in the Earliest History of Christianity. London: SCM Press.
- Hengel, Martin (1985). Studies in the Gospels of Mark. Philadelphia, PA: Fortress Press.
- ——— (1989). The Zealots : Investigations into the Jewish Freedom Movement in the Period from Herod I until 70 A.D. Edinburgh: T. & T. Clark.
- ——— (1989). The 'Hellenization' of Judea in the First Century after Christ. London: SCM Press.
- ——— (1989). The Johannine Question. London: SCM Press.
- ——— (2000). The Four Gospels and the One Gospel of Jesus Christ: An Investigation of the Collection and Origin of the Canonical Gospels (1st North American ed.). Harrisburg, PA: Trinity Press International.
- ———; Schwemer, Anna Maria (2007). Jesus und das Judentum. Geschichte des frühen Christentums (in German). Tübingen: Mohr Siebeck.

== See also ==
- New Perspective on Paul
- Paul the Apostle and Jewish Christianity
- Tübingen School
