= Bede Professor of Catholic Theology =

The Bede Professor of Catholic Theology is a professorship or chair in the Department of Theology and Religion at Durham University. The chair is named after the Venerable Bede and is the first such post at a secular British University. The chair was established in 2008, following a benefaction of £2,000,000 from the Diocese of Hexham & Newcastle, Sisters of Mercy, Sisters of La Retraite and the Ballinger Charitable Trust.

The holder of the Bede chair acts as a theological advisor to the Bishop of Hexham and Newcastle and undertakes outreach work on behalf of the Diocese and thus one of the requirements of the post holder is to be a practising Catholic.

== List of Bede Professors ==
- Lewis Ayres (2009 to 2012)
- Karen Kilby (2014 to present)

== See also ==
- Durham University
- Van Mildert Professor of Divinity
- Lightfoot Professor of Divinity
- St Hilda Professor of Catholic Social Thought & Practice
- Kevin Dunn (bishop)
