= Stanley Lawrence Greenslade =

English theologian, ecclesiastical historian and clergyman

Stanley Lawrence Greenslade FBA (14 May 1905 – 8 December 1977) was an English theologian, ecclesiastical historian and clergyman. He held the Regius Professorship of Ecclesiastical History at the University of Oxford from 1959 to 1972.

== Early life and education ==
Born on 14 May 1905 into a Methodist family, he was the son of William Greenslade, a Bristol- and Woodford-based businessman, and Alice, née Sear. The family's finances were often stretched, but Greenslade probably developed a love of reading from his mother. He was educated at a state school in Woodford; from there, he won a highly competitive scholarship to Christ's Hospital. There, under the headship of William Hamilton Fyfe, he enjoyed a rich musical and classical education, and won a classical scholarship to Hertford College, Oxford, where he studied under J. D. Denniston. He graduated with a second-class degree in 1927. By that time, he had turned to Anglicanism and spent a year reading for the theology honours school, in which he placed in the first class in 1928.

== Academia ==
After that, Greenslade studied to become a priest and served as curate at Beeston in 1929–30. He was then elected a fellow and chaplain of St John's College, Oxford, in 1930, where he was also the librarian. There, he began a research project on William Tyndale, which resulted in The Work of William Tindale (1938), and also became an expert in the North African Fathers of the Church.

He left St John's College in 1943 to take up the Lightfoot Professorship of Divinity at Durham University, which came with a canonry at Durham Cathedral. He authored The Church and the Social Order (1948) and gave the Edward Cadbury Lecture at the University of Birmingham in 1949–50. In 1950, he succeeded Michael Ramsey as Van Mildert Professor of Divinity at Durham. During his time in that chair, he authored Schism in the Early Church (1953; 2nd ed. 1964), Church and State from Constantine to Theodosius (1954, which he had given as the Frederick Denison Maurice Lecture at King's College London in 1953) and Early Latin Theology: Selections from Tertullian, Cyprian, Ambrose and Jerome (1956). In 1958, he moved to the University of Cambridge to take up the Ely Professorship of Divinity; he was a canon of Ely Cathedral and a fellow of Selwyn College. But the next year, he was offered the Regius Professorship of Ecclesiastical History at the University of Oxford and accepted it; it was attached to a canonry at Christ Church, Oxford. In 1960, he was elected a fellow of the British Academy. He then authored The English Reformers and the Fathers of the Church (1960), (as editor) The Cambridge History of the Bible: The West from the Reformation to the Present Day (1963), and Shepherding the Flock (1967), and, from 1969, he began researching Erasmus's use of the Church Fathers's theologies. He retired from his academic positions in 1972. He died on 8 December 1977.
