= Jesus and the Eyewitnesses =

2006 book by Richard Bauckham

- Author: Richard Bauckham
- Language: English
- Genre: Religion
- Publisher: Eerdmans
- Publication date: 2006; 2017 (second edition)
- Pages: 504 pages
- ISBN: 0802863906

Jesus and the Eyewitnesses: The Gospels as Eyewitness Testimony is a book written by biblical scholar and theologian Richard Bauckham and published in 2006 (Grand Rapids: Eerdmans).

The book challenges the view held by scholars since the rise of form criticism in the early twentieth century that "while the eyewitnesses originated (at least some of) the traditions about Jesus, these were then transmitted as anonymous traditions in the early Christian communities, developing in all sorts of ways in the process, and reached the Gospel writers as the product of such community transmission and development." It argues that the synoptic Gospels are based "quite closely" on the testimony of eyewitnesses, while one (the Gospel of John) is written by an eyewitness, which he argues is John the Elder. The final chapter offers a theological argument against the dichotomy between the Christ of faith and the historical Jesus. The volume has been both described as widely influential or paradigmatic in New Testament studies and representative of a more general shift towards more conservative views of the gospels.

An expanded second edition of Jesus and the Eyewitnesses was published by Eerdmans in 2017.

== Reception ==
Ben Witherington III described Jesus and the Eyewitnesses as a paradigm shift in Gospels study. In a special issue of the Journal for the Study of the Historical Jesus devoted to the book, Samuel Byrskog described it as "a remarkable achievement which rightly places the role of eyewitnesses in early Christianity on the international scholarly agenda and points to its historical and theological significance." James Carleton Paget notes that Bauckham's study reflects a general shift in New Testament scholarship towards more conservative views on the gospels' content and historicity. According to Judith CS Redman, this book also contributes among others to "offer a new paradigm which does not ignore the Fourth Gospel in the search for historical information about Jesus". According to historical Jesus scholar Sara Parks, it is "a blend of careful work which contributes to scholarly knowledge, and of heavy bias which only contributes to the polemical din" which "has always characterized Historical Jesus Research".

Jerome Murphy O'Connor agreed with Bauckham's essential thesis in Jesus and the Eyewitnesses. While he questioned the usage of inclusio and critiqued a minor exaggeration on his usage of names, O'Connor found the main case for the general historical reliability of the gospels to be correct and found Bauckham's discussion of Papias to be highly cogent. O'Connor accepted Bauckham's case for John the Elder as the final author of the Gospel of John.

Writing for Neotestamentica, Marius Nel described Jesus and the Eyewitnesses as a scholarly "masterpiece" that all scholars should engage with. While he noted that some aspects such as the identification of the Beloved Disciple with John the Elder and certain literary devices might not be accepted by all scholars, there is no doubt that his case for the influence of eyewitness influence in the gospels will not be dismissed.

Alan Kirk praised Bauckham for realizing the deep link between true memory and tradition, potentially contributing widely to Jesus research and the demise of form criticism, and his pioneering and underappreciated application of cognition and memory to the Jesus tradition. However, Kirk argues that the divide between eyewitness testimony and the Jesus tradition affected Bauckham's overall case in Jesus and the Eyewitnesses provides.

Rafael Rodriguez has commended Bauckham's work as a needed correction of scholars that assume a gap between eyewitnesses and what remains of the early Christian writings today. He is less convinced by details on eyewitness memory formation.

Magdalena Vytlacilova finds the evangelists' citation practices to be out of line with the biographers Bauckham refers to, though she agrees it is possible the gospel writers drew on eyewitnesses.

Writing for the Journal of Theological Studies, Michael Licona described the second edition of Jesus and the Eyewitnesses as a significant strengthening of the first volume's arguments, and suggested that the book's influence as a paradigm-shifter would be similar to that of Richard Burridge's What are the Gospels?

Bauckham reflected in a 2016 debate on Premier Christian Radio that when the book was first published there was a "huge range of reactions, from people who are wildly enthusiastic to people who absolutely hate it". In 2008, Bauckham responded to reviews by Samuel Byrskog, David Catchpole, I Howard Marshall, Stephen Patterson, and Theodore Weeden.

Johannine scholar Cornelis Bennema agreed with Bauckham's case for the Beloved Disciple as the author of the Fourth Gospel and found his case for Nicodemus as the uncle of Naqdimon ben Gurion convincing.

Jeannine Marie Hanger praised Jesus and the Eyewitnesses as a "weighty" and "compelling" argument for John the Elder as the eyewitness author of the Gospel of John. Samuel L. Voo also aligned with Bauckham's views on the authorship of the Gospel of John.

Tobias Hägerland and Cecilia Wassen described Jesus and the Eyewitnesses as a 'valuable work' on the place of eyewitnesses in early Christianity and found no reason to doubt that an eyewitness was behind the Gospel of John given its accurate description of Jerusalem under Jesus's time; the author of the gospel is said to be a disciple whom Jesus loved, and could be identified with John the Elder rather than Zebedee.

Kamil Gregor and Brian Blais argued that the statistical distribution of names in the Gospels and Acts did not correspond strongly with that of Jews at the time or that the New Testament was mostly historical, but Luuk van de Weghe and Jason Wilson responded to the paper in turn, arguing that the name statistics of the Gospels and Acts are very congruous with those of Jews of their time as Bauckham envisioned.

== Awards ==
It was awarded the 2007 Christianity Today book award in biblical studies and, in 2009, it received the Michael Ramsey Prize for theological writing, one of the judges stating that the work “placed something of a bomb under a good deal of New Testament scholarship".
