= Richard Bauckham =

British theologian (born 1946)

Richard Bauckham FRSE FBA
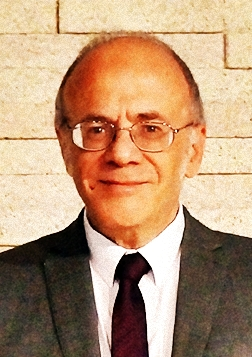
- Richard Bauckham
- Born: 22 September 1946 (age 80); London, England
- Title: Retired Professor of New Testament Studies and Bishop Wardlaw Professor in the University of St Andrews
- Parent(s): John Robert Bauckham (1911–1980) and Stephiana Lilham (Lilian) (1911–1998)

Academic background
- Education: Clare College, University of Cambridge
- Thesis: (1972)

Academic work
- Institutions: Ridley Hall, Cambridge
- Main interests: New Testament Christology and the Gospel of John
- Notable works: Jesus and the Eyewitnesses

Richard John Bauckham FRSE FBA (/ˈbɔːkəm/; born 22 September 1946) is an English Anglican scholar in theology, historical theology and New Testament studies, specialising in New Testament Christology and the Gospel of John. He is a senior scholar at Ridley Hall, Cambridge.

In 2006, Bauckham published his most widely-read work Jesus and the Eyewitnesses, a book that defends the historical reliability of the gospels. Bauckham argues that the synoptic gospels are based "quite closely" on the testimony of eyewitnesses, and the Gospel of John is written by an eyewitness. This opposes the view that the four gospels were written later and not via interviews with direct eyewitnesses, but were rather the result of a longer chain of transmission of stories of Jesus filtered through early Christian communities over time.

The book was well-received, earning the 2007 Christianity Today book award in biblical studies and the Michael Ramsey Prize in 2009. Bauckham updated and expanded the book to respond to critics in a second edition, published in 2017.

== Life and career ==
Bauckham was born in London and studied history at Clare College, Cambridge (1966–72). He was a fellow of St John's College, Cambridge (1972–75), before teaching theology for one year at the University of Leeds and for fifteen years at the University of Manchester from 1977 to 1992. At Manchester, he was the Lecturer in the History of Christian Thought. Bauckham moved to the University of St Andrews in 1992 to be a professor of New Testament Studies and the named professorship of Bishop Wardlaw Professor. He retired in 2007 in order to concentrate on research and writing.

He is a fellow of the British Academy and a Fellow of the Royal Society of Edinburgh. Bauckham is a senior scholar at Ridley Hall in Cambridge, and a visiting professor at St Mellitus College in London.

== Research and teaching areas ==
Bauckham has been published in a variety of fields in New Testament studies and early Christianity. He has also published on the theology of the German theologian Jürgen Moltmann. His current research interests include Jesus and the Gospels, New Testament Christology, and the relevance of the Bible to ecological issues.

He gave the Sarum Lectures for 2006 on "Beyond Stewardship: The Bible and the Community of Creation". He also gave a series of the Scottish Journal of Theology Lectures in Aberdeen on "The Gospels as History: Comparisons with Ancient and Modern Historiography".

== Honours ==
- Christianity Today Book Award in Biblical Studies (2007) for Jesus and the Eyewitnesses: The Gospels as Eyewitness Testimony.
- Burkitt Medal (2008) in recognition of special service to Biblical Studies.
- Michael Ramsey Prize (2009) for Jesus and the Eyewitnesses : The Gospels as Eyewitness Testimony.
- Franz-Delitzsch-Award (2010) for The Jewish World around the New Testament.

== Works ==
=== Books ===
- Bauckham, Richard J. (1978). Tudor Apocalypse: Sixteenth-century Apocalypticism, Millenarianism and the English Reformation. The Courtenay library of reformation classics. Vol. 8. OCLC 163971172.
- ——— (1983). 2 Peter, Jude. Word Biblical Commentary. Vol. 50. Waco, TX: Word Books. ISBN 9780849902499. OCLC 9335798.
- ——— (1987). Moltmann: Messianic Theology in the Making. Basingstoke, UK: Marshall Pickering. ISBN 9780551015661. OCLC 246805148.
- ——— (1989). The Bible in Politics: How to Read the Bible Politically. London & Louisville, KY: SPCK & Westminster John Knox Press. ISBN 9780664250881. OCLC 19885676.
- ——— (1990). Word Biblical Themes: Jude, 2 Peter. Carlisle, UK: Trust Media Distribution. ISBN 978-0849907920.
- ——— (1990). Jude and the Relatives of Jesus in the Early Church. Edinburgh: T & T Clark. ISBN 9780567095732. OCLC 924744430.
- ——— (1993). The Theology of the Book of Revelation. New Testament Theology. Cambridge: Cambridge University Press. ISBN 9780521356107. OCLC 231552087.
- ——— (1993). The Climax of Prophecy: Studies on the Book of Revelation. Edinburgh: T & T Clark. ISBN 9780567096203. OCLC 716346095.
- ——— (1995). The Theology of Jürgen Moltmann. Edinburgh: T & T Clark. ISBN 9780567292773. OCLC 804840573.
- ——— (1998). The Fate of the Dead: Studies on the Jewish and Christian Apocalypses. Supplements to Novum Testamentum. Vol. 93. Leiden & Boston: Brill. ISBN 9789004112032. OCLC 38879286.
- ——— (1998). God Crucified: Monotheism and Christology in the New Testament. Didsbury lectures, 1996. Carlisle, UK: Paternoster Press. ISBN 9780853649441. OCLC 718467437.
- ——— (1999). James: Wisdom of James, Disciple of Jesus the Sage. New Testament Readings. London: Routledge. ISBN 9780415103695. OCLC 924614351.
- ——— (2002). Gospel Women: Studies of the Named Women in the Gospels. Grand Rapids, MI: Eerdmans. ISBN 9780802849991. OCLC 845480166.
- ——— (2003). Bible and Mission: Christian Witness in a Postmodern World. Grand Rapids, MI: Baker Academic. ISBN 9780801027710. OCLC 1040449445.
- ——— (2006). Jesus and the Eyewitnesses: The Gospels as Eyewitness Testimony. Grand Rapids, MI: Eerdmans. ISBN 9780802863904. OCLC 1044528718.
- ———; Hart, Trevor (2006). Finding God in the Midst of Life: Old Stories for Contemporary Readers. Bletchley, Milton Keynes, UK: Paternoster. ISBN 9781842274729. OCLC 129995575.
- ——— (2007). The Testimony of the Beloved Disciple: Narrative, History, and Theology in the Gospel of John. Grand Rapids, MI: Baker Academic. ISBN 9780801034855. OCLC 154685864.
- ——— (2008). The Jewish World around the New Testament: Collect Essays I. Wissenschaftliche Untersuchungen zum Neuen Testament. Vol. 233. Tubingen: MohrSiebeck. OCLC 474120510.
- ——— (2008). Jesus and the God of Israel: God Crucified and Other Studies on the New Testament's Christology of Divine Identity. Grand Rapids, MI: Eerdmans. ISBN 978-0-8028-4559-7. OCLC 458760861.
- ——— (2010). The Bible in Politics: How to Read the Bible Politically (2nd ed.). Louisville, KY: Westminster John Knox Press. ISBN 9780664250881. OCLC 19885676.
- ——— (2010). Bible and Ecology: Rediscovering the Community of Creation. Sarum Theological Lectures. London: Darton, Longman & Todd. ISBN 9780232527919. OCLC 1040342478.
- ——— (2011). Jesus: A Very Short Introduction. Very Short Introductions. Vol. 275. Oxford & New York: Oxford University Press. ISBN 9780199575275. OCLC 713182402.
- ——— (2011). Living with Other Creatures: Green Exegesis and Theology. Waco, TX: Baylor University Press. ISBN 9781602584112. OCLC 707968311.
- ——— (2015). Gospel of Glory: Major Themes in Johannine Theology. Grand Rapids, MI: Baker Academic. ISBN 9780801096129. OCLC 1023121441.
- ——— (2016). The Bible in the Contemporary World: Hermeneutical Ventures. Grand Rapids, MI: Eerdmans. ISBN 9780802872234. OCLC 980945175.
- ——— (2017). Jesus and the Eyewitnesses: The Gospels as Eyewitness Testimony (2nd ed.). Grand Rapids, MI: Eerdmans. ISBN 9780802874313. OCLC 992545220.
- ——— (2017). The Christian World Around the New Testament : Collected Essays II. Wissenschaftliche Untersuchungen zum Neuen Testament. Vol. 386. Tübingen: Mohr Siebeck. ISBN 9783161533051. OCLC 1012497962.

=== Chapters ===
- ——— (1999). "The Lord's Day". In Carson, D.A. (ed.). From Sabbath to Lord's Day. Oregon: Wipf and Stock. pp. 221–250. ISBN 1579103073.
- ——— (1999). "Sabbath and Sunday in the Post-Apostolic Church". In Carson, D.A. (ed.). From Sabbath to Lord's Day. Oregon: Wipf and Stock. pp. 251–298. ISBN 1579103073.
- ——— (1999). "Sabbath and Sunday in the Medieval Church in the Wester". In Carson, D.A. (ed.). From Sabbath to Lord's Day. Oregon: Wipf and Stock. pp. 299–310. ISBN 1579103073.
- ——— (1999). "Sabbath and Sunday in the Protestant Tradition". In Carson, D.A. (ed.). From Sabbath to Lord's Day. Oregon: Wipf and Stock. pp. 311–342. ISBN 1579103073.
- ——— (2001). "Revelation commentary". In Barton, John; Muddiman, John (eds.). The Oxford Bible Commentary. Oxford: Oxford University Press. ISBN 1579103073.
- ——— (2006). "Tobit as a Parable for the Exiles of Northern Israel". In Bredin, Mark (ed.). Studies in the Book of Tobit: A Multidisciplinary Approach. Library of Second Temple studies. Vol. 55. London: T&T Clark. pp. 140–64. ISBN 9780567082299. OCLC 470778570.
- ——— (2009). "Jesus, God and Nature in the Gospels". In White, Robert S. (ed.). Creation in Crisis: Christian Perspectives on Sustainability. London: SPCK. pp. 209–224. ISBN 9780281061907.
- ——— (2010). "Hell in the Latin Vision of Ezra". Other Worlds and Their Relation to This World: early Jewish and ancient Christian traditions. Supplements to the Journal for the study of Judaism. Vol. 143. Leiden & Boston: Brill. pp. 323–342. OCLC 780508794.

=== Journal articles ===
- ——— (1977). "The eschatological earthquake in the Apocalypse of John". Novum Testamentum. 19 (3): 224–233. doi:10.1163/156853677X00156.
- ——— (1979). "Barnabas in Galatians". Journal for the Study of the New Testament. 1 (2): 61–70. doi:10.1177/0142064X7900100204. S2CID 161711312.
- ——— (1985). "The Fall of the Angels as the Source of Philosophy in Hermias and Clement of Alexandria". Vigiliae Christianae. 39 (4): 313–330. doi:10.1163/157007285X00078.
- ——— (February 1986). "The Apocalypses in the New Pseudepigrapha". Journal for the Study of the New Testament. 26: 97–117.
- ——— (October 1987). "Theodicy from Ivan Karamazov to Moltmann". Modern Theology. 4 (1): 83–97. doi:10.1111/j.1468-0025.1987.tb00157.x.
- ——— (September 1988). "Pseudo-Apostolic Letters". Journal of Biblical Literature. 107 (3): 469–494. doi:10.2307/3267581. JSTOR 3267581.
- ——— (June 1991). "The List of the Tribes in Revelation 7 Again". Journal for the Study of the New Testament. 42: 99–115.
- ——— (July 1991). "Salome the Sister of Jesus, Salome the Disciple of Jesus, and the Secret Gospel of Mark". Novum Testamentum. 33 (3): 245–275. doi:10.1163/156853691X00033.
- ——— (March 1993). "The Beloved Disciple as Ideal Author". Journal for the Study of the New Testament. 49: 21–44.
- ——— (1994). "The Brothers and Sisters of Jesus: An Epiphanian Response to John P. Meier". Catholic Biblical Quarterly. 56 (4): 686–700.
- ——— (1995). "Tamar's Ancestry and Rahab's Marriage: Two Problems in the Matthean Genealogy". Novum Testamentum. 37 (4): 313–329. doi:10.1163/1568536952663168.
- ——— (1995). "The Messianic Interpretation of Isa. 10: 34 in the Dead Sea Scrolls, 2 Baruch and the Preaching of John the Baptist". Dead Sea Discoveries. 2 (2): 202–216. doi:10.1163/156851795X00166.
- ——— (Fall 1996). "The Parable of the Royal Wedding Feast (Matthew 22:1-14) and the Parable of the Lame Man and the Blind Man (Apocryphon of Ezekial)". Journal of Biblical Literature. 115 (3): 471–488. doi:10.2307/3266897. JSTOR 3266897.
- ——— (1996). "Kingdom and Church According To Jesus and Paul1". Horizons in Biblical Theology. 18 (1): 1–26. doi:10.1163/187122096X00013.
- ——— (1997). "The Acts of Paul: Replacement of Acts or Sequel to Acts?". Semeia. 80: 159–168.
- ——— (January 1997). "The Book of Ruth and the Possibility of a Feminist Canonical Hermeneutic". Biblical Interpretation. 5 (1): 29–45. doi:10.1163/156851597X00021.
- ——— (2000). "What if Paul Had Travelled East Rather Than West?". Biblical Interpretation. 8 (1–2): 171–184. doi:10.1163/156851500750119150.
- ——— (2003). "The Eyewitnesses and the Gospel Traditions". Journal for the Study of the Historical Jesus. 1 (1): 28–60. doi:10.1177/147686900300100103.
- ——— (2004). "Judgment in the Book of Revelation". Ex Auditu. 20: 1–24.
- ——— (December 2008). "Eyewitnesses and Critical History: A Response to Jens Schröter and Craig Evans". Journal for the Study of the New Testament. 31 (2): 221–235. doi:10.1177/0142064X08098283. S2CID 162401824.
- ——— (2008). "In Response to My Respondents: Jesus and the Eyewitnesses in Review". Journal for the Study of the Historical Jesus. 6 (2): 225–253. doi:10.1163/174551908X349707.
- ——— (2009). "The Eyewitnesses in the Gospel of Mark." Svensk exegetisk årsbok". 74: 19–39.
- ——— (March–April 2010). "A Response to Professor Moltmann". Theology. 113 (872): 95–96. doi:10.1177/0040571X1011300203. S2CID 171955044.
- ——— (March 2010). "Seeking the Identity of Jesus". Journal for the Study of the New Testament. 32 (3): 337–346. doi:10.1177/0142064X09357679. S2CID 145594266.
- ——— (Winter 2011). "The Story of the Earth According to Paul: Romans 8:18-23". Review & Expositor. 108 (1): 91–97. doi:10.1177/003463731110800109. S2CID 146843458.
- ——— (2012). "The Caiaphas Family". Journal for the Study of the Historical Jesus. 10 (1): 3–31. doi:10.1163/174551911X618867.
- ——— (2014). "Did Papias Write History or Exegesis?". The Journal of Theological Studies. 65 (2): 463–488. doi:10.1093/jts/flu113.
- ———; de Luca, Stefano (2015). "Magdala As We Know It". Early Christianity. 6: 91–118. doi:10.1628/186870315X14249562918118.
- ——— (2015). "Further Thoughts on the Migdal Synagogue Stone". Novum Testamentum. 57 (2): 113–135. doi:10.1163/15685365-12341491.
- ——— (2016). "The General and the Particular in Memory". Journal for the Study of the Historical Jesus. 14 (1): 28–51. doi:10.1163/17455197-01401004.

=== Festschrift ===
- Gurtner, Daniel M.; Macaskill, Grant; Pennington, Jonathan T., eds. (2016). In the Fullness of Time: essays on Christology, creation, and eschatology in honor of Richard Bauckham. Grand Rapids, MI: Eerdmans. ISBN 9780802873378. OCLC 969913553.
