= Anna Rowlands =

British Catholic theologian (born 1975)

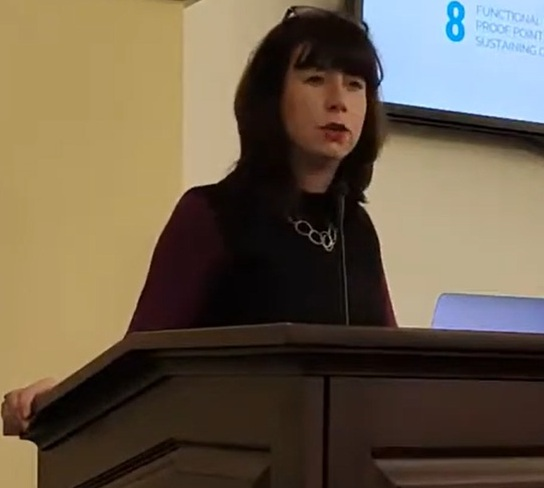
- Rowlands in 2020
- Born: 1975 (age 50–51)

Academic background
- Education: Girton College, Cambridge; Heythrop College, University of London; University of Manchester
- Thesis: Practical theology in 'the third city' (2006)
- Doctoral advisor: Elaine Graham

Academic work
- Discipline: Theologian
- Sub-discipline: political theology; Catholic social teaching; contemporary Catholic theology

Anna Frances Rowlands (born 1975) is a British theologian and academic, specialising in political theology, Catholic social teaching and contemporary Catholic theology. Since 2017, she has been St Hilda Professor of Catholic Social Thought and Practice at the University of Durham. She has been on secondment at the Vatican for the Synod on Synodality, working with the General Secretariat of the Synod and the Dicastery for Promoting Integral Human Development, since 2023. She has previously taught at Westcott House, Cambridge, the Margaret Beaufort Institute of Theology, and King's College, London.

== Early life and education ==
Rowlands was born in 1975. She was educated at a comprehensive school in Stockport. From 1993 to 1996, she studied for her undergraduate degree in Social and Political Sciences at the Girton College, Cambridge. She studied for a master's degree in theology at Heythrop College, a constituent college of the University of London affiliated with the Roman Catholic Church. She undertook postgraduate research in the School of Arts, Languages and Cultures, University of Manchester, completing her Doctor of Philosophy (PhD) degree in 2006. Her doctoral thesis was titled "Practical theology in 'the third city'", and was supervised by Elaine Graham.

== Academic career ==
She has previously taught at Westcott House, Cambridge, a Church of England theological college, and at the Margaret Beaufort Institute of Theology, a Roman Catholic theological college which is part of the Cambridge Theological Federation, and King's College, London. Since 2017, she has been St Hilda Professor of Catholic Social Thought and Practice at the University of Durham.

From 2023 to 2025, she was on secondment at the Vatican for the Synod on Synodality, working with the General Secretariat of the Synod and the Dicastery for Promoting Integral Human Development. In March 2026, she was re-appointed a member of the Dicastery for Integral Human Development. In May 2026, she took part in the presentation of Leo XIV's first encyclical Magnifica humanitas, alongside the Pope and other experts.

Her research interests included the social philosophers Hannah Arendt, Simone Weil and Gillian Rose. She focuses on the "interface of political and social theory and Christian theology". She is also interested in the social teachings of the papacy, beginning with Pope Leo XIII's encyclical Rerum novarum (1891) onwards.

In 2023, she was awarded the Expanded Reason Award for research for her book Towards a Politics of Communion: Catholic Social Teaching in Dark Times; the award is a collaboration between the Francisco de Vitoria University and the Joseph Ratzinger-Benedict XVI Vatican Foundation.

== Personal life ==
Rowlands was brought up in Manchester, England, by her Catholic Irish diaspora family. She was married to an Anglican priest, with whom she has one son.

== Selected works ==
- Graham, Elaine; Rowlands, Anna, eds. (2005). Pathways to the Public Square: Practical Theology in an Age of Pluralism; International Academy of Practical Theology, Manchester 2003. International Practical Theology. Vol. 1. Münster: LIT-Verl. ISBN 978-3825884239.
- Rowlands, Anna (2021). Towards a Politics of Communion: Catholic Social Teaching in Dark Times. London: Bloomsbury. ISBN 978-0567219084.
- Phillips, Elizabeth; Rowlands, Anna; Daughton, Amy, eds. (2021). T&T Clark Reader in Political Theology. London: T&T Clark. ISBN 978-0567666970.
- Rowlands, Anna; Fiddian-Qasmiyeh, Elena (eds.). The Oxford Handbook of Religion and Contemporary Migration. New York: Oxford University Press. ISBN 9780190076528.
