= Margaret Beaufort Institute of Theology =

Coordinates: 52.1984°N 0.1053°E

The Margaret Beaufort Institute of Theology is a Roman Catholic theological college in Cambridge, England. The institute was founded in 1993 to provide religious and theological education to Catholic laywomen: it now offers theological education to both women and men, and to both Catholics and non-Catholics. It is named for Lady Margaret Beaufort, mother of King Henry VII. The institute is part of the Cambridge Theological Federation, through which courses and degrees are validated by Anglia Ruskin University or the University of Cambridge.

The Religious Life Institute (RLI), which engages in research on Catholic and Anglican religious life, is based at the Margaret Beaufort Institute. The is led by Dr. Gemma Simmonds CJ.

In November 2022, the Institute put its 0.45-hectare (1.1-acre) 12–14 Grange Road site up for sale for £5 million.

== Notable staff ==
- Anna Rowlands, director of pastoral studies and tutor in theology

=== Principals ===
- 1993–2005 Sr Bridget Tighe, FMDM
- 2006–2011 Dr Susan O'Brien
- 2012–2017 Dr Oonagh O'Brien
- 2017– Dr Anna Abram
