= Karen Kilby =

American theologian (born 1964)

- Born: 1964 (age 61–62); Connecticut, US
- Spouse: John Hunton

Academic background
- Education: University of St Andrews; Yale University; Cambridge University
- Thesis: The Vorgriff auf esse (1994)
- Doctoral advisor: George Lindbeck; Kathryn Tanner
- Influences: Thomas Aquinas; Karl Rahner

Academic work
- Discipline: Theology
- Sub-discipline: Systematic theology
- School or tradition: Catholicism
- Institutions: University of Nottingham; Durham University
- Notable ideas: Apophatic trinitarianism

Karen Kilby (born 1964) is an American lay Catholic theologian. She is currently the Bede Professor of Catholic Theology and Director of the Centre for Catholic Studies in the Department of Theology and Religion at Durham University.

== Early life and education ==
Born in England and raised in Connecticut, Kilby graduated with a BA Summa Cum Laude in Mathematics and Religious Studies from Yale University in 1986. She also earned a MASt. in Mathematics (Part III of the Mathematical Tripos) from the University of Cambridge (1987) before completing her PhD in Theology at Yale University (1994), studying under George Lindbeck (author of the influential The Nature of Doctrine) and Kathryn Tanner (author of Christ the Key). Her thesis focused on the theology of the Catholic theologian Karl Rahner: "The Vorgriff auf esse: A study in the relation of philosophy to theology in the thought of Karl Rahner". Kilby is married to John Hunton, professor of Pure Mathematics at Durham University. They have three children.

== Career ==
Between 1994 and 1996, Kilby was a Gifford Postdoctoral Research Fellow at the University of St Andrews. She taught at the University of Birmingham from 1998 to 2001 before joining the University of Nottingham in 2001 as a lecturer and was promoted to assistant professor and then professor in 2013. She served for 3.5 years as head of the department of Theology and Religious Studies.

In January 2014, Kilby was appointed Bede Professor of Catholic Theology at Durham University, thus becoming the second occupant (and first woman) of ‘one of Britain’s most prestigious posts in Catholic academia’.

She was President of the Catholic Theological Association of Great Britain between 2010 and 2012 and of the Society for the Study of Theology from 2017 to 2018.

Kilby is also an occasional contributor to The Times Literary Supplement, Commonweal (magazine), and The Tablet. She has been invited to give presentations to internationally established conferences, including the Thomistic Institute (Angelicum, Rome, in 2021), the Karl Barth Society of North America (Princeton University, 2019), and LEST XI, KU Leuven (2017). Kilby has also given university sermons at the University of St Andrews, the University of Oxford, and the University of Cambridge, and public lectures in Malta, Leeds, York, and London.

== Projects ==
In the last decade, Kilby has conducted two funded research projects. The first was "Love and Suffering", conducted in partnership with the Sisters of the Congregation of La Retraite (2015–18). Her current project, co-led with Clare Carlisle (King's College London), is "Phenomenology of Theological: Modelling Enquiry and Poesis" (2022-2023). It is part of Widening Horizons in Philosophical Theology, an international initiative led by Prof. Judith Wolfe and funded by the Templeton Religion Trust.

== Outreach ==
The Bede Professor of Catholic Theology is the first endowed chair of Catholic theology in a secular British university. The holder of the Bede Chair serves as theological adviser to the Bishop of Hexham and Newcastle. Kilby’s engagement has included work at the local diocesan and national levels.

At the local level, this has included involvement in the Core Group for Diocesan Synod, work as theological consultant to Hexham and Newcastle’s Forward Together in Hope project, as well as speaking to groups of clergy, diocesan festivals, and in a variety of parishes around the diocese of Hexham and Newcastle.

At the national level, Kilby is a Trustee of CAFOD and member of its Theological Reference Group. She is also a member of the Theological Retreat Group for the Archbishop of Canterbury, and has served as a consultant to the Saint Vincent de Paul society. Her outreach has also included lectures to the conferences of Catholic University chaplains (2015), of Catholic Retreat Leaders/Spiritual Directors (2016), of Passionist priests and sisters (2019), and of Catholic Prison Chaplains (2021).

She has been involved in designing and directing a new online course for distance learning MA in Catholic theology at Durham University.

== Theological contribution ==
Kilby’s theological contribution lies primarily within the discipline of systematic theology. She has written about the Trinity, with a noted critique of Social Trinitarianism.^{.}She is also known for her writings on two major Twentieth century Catholic theologians Karl Rahner and Hans Urs von Balthasar. More recently, she has contributed to pioneering theological reflection on suffering and evil in Christian theology. Kilby’s work raises key questions regarding the role of mystery in theology as well as the purpose and limits of theology as a discipline.

== Works ==
=== Monographs ===
- Kilby, Karen (2004). Karl Rahner: Theology and Philosophy. London: Routledge. ISBN 978-0-415-25965-1.
- Kilby, Karen (2007). Karl Rahner: A Brief Introduction. London: SPCK. ISBN 978-0-281-05842-6.
- Kilby, Karen (2012). Balthasar: A (Very) Critical Introduction. Grand Rapids, Michigan: Wm. B. Eerdmans. ISBN 978-1-4674-3642-7.
- Kilby, Karen (2020). God, Evil and the Limits of Theology. London: T&T Clark. ISBN 978-0-567-68457-8.

=== Co-edited volumes ===
- Ian A. McFarland, David A. S. Fergusson, Karen Kilby, Iain R. Torrance, The Cambridge Dictionary of Christian Theology, Cambridge University Press, 2011.
- Simon Oliver, Karen Kilby and Tom O’Loughlin (eds), Faithful Reading: New Essays in Theology in Honour of Fergus Kerr, OP. T+T Clark, 2013.
- Karen Kilby and Rachel Davies, eds, Suffering and the Christian Life (Bloomsbury T+T Clark, 2019)

=== Chapters in co-edited volumes ===
- "Balthasar and Karl Rahner’, in The Cambridge Companion to Hans Urs Von Balthasar, Edward T. Oakes, S. J., and David Moss (eds.), Cambridge University Press, 2004.
- "Rahner", in The Modern Theologians: An introduction to modern theology since 1918, David Ford and Rachel Muers, Blackwell Publications, 2005 (3rd Edition).
- "Rahner", In The Blackwell Companion to Modern Theology, Gareth Jones (ed.), Wiley-Blackwell, 2007.
- "Hans Urs von Balthasar on the Trinity, The Cambridge Companion to the Trinity, Peter C. Phan (ed.), Cambridge University Press, 2011.
- "Seeking Clarity." In the Routledge Companion to the Practice of Christian Theology. Higton, Mike & Fodor, Jim Routledge, 2014.
- "Trinity and Politics: An Apophatic Approach". In Advancing Trinitarian Theology: Explorations in Constructive Dogmatics. Crisp, Oliver & Sanders, Fred Zondervan, 2014.
- "Christian Theology, Anti-Liberalism, and Modern Jewish Thought." In Judaism in Contemporary Thought: Traces and Influence. Bielik-Robson, Agata & Lipszyc, Adam, Abingdon, Oxon: Routledge, 2014.
- "Responsible, Critical Assent." in Towards a Kenotic Vision of Authority in the Catholic Church. Carroll, Anthony, Kerkwijk, Marthe Kirwan, Michael & Sweeney, James Council for Research and Values in Philosophy, 2015.
- "Philosophy." In The Cambridge Companion to TheSumma Theologiae. McCosker, Philip & Turner, Denys Cambridge University Press, 2016.
- "Trinity, Tradition and Politics" in Recent Developments in Trinitarian Theology: an International Symposium. Chalamet, C & Vial, M Fortress Press. 73-86.
- "Eschatology, Suffering and the Limits of Theology." in Game Over? Reconsidering Eschatology. Chalamet, Christophe, Dettwiler, Andreas Mazzocco, Mariel & Waterlot, Ghislain Berlin: De Gruyter., 2017.
- “The Seductions of Kenosis” in Karen Kilby and Rachel Davies, Suffering and the Christian Life", Bloomsbury T+T Clark, 2019.
- "Catholicism, Protestantism and the Theological Location of Paradox: Nature, Grace, Sin", in Peter de Mey and Wim Francois (eds), Ecclesia Semper Reformanda: Renewal and Reform Beyond Polemics (Leuven: Peeters, 2020).
- "What Difference Does Grace Make? An Exploration of the Concept of Grace in the Theological Anthropology of Karl Rahner" in Theology and Evolutionary Anthropology: Dialogues in Wisdom, Humility and Grace, Celia Deane-Drummond and Agustín Fuentes (eds.), London: Routledge, 2020.
- “Sin and Suffering Reconsidered” in The Human in a Dehumanizing World: Re-Examining Theological Anthropology and Its Implications, edited by Jessica Coblentz and Daniel P. Horan, OFM, (eds.) Maryknoll: Orbis Books, 2022.
- "Letter to a Young Theologian" in Letters to a Young Theologian, Henco Van Der Westhuizen (ed.), Minneapolis: Fortress Press, 2021.
- "Suffering and Sin Revisited: A Conceptual Exploration" in The Human in a Dehumanizing World: Re-Examining Theological Anthropology and Its Implications. Coblentz, Jessica & Horan, Daniel P. Maryknoll: Orbis Books, 2022.
- "Belief, Unbelief and Mystery' in Atheisms: The Philosophy of Non-Belief. Harris, Harriet A. & Harrison, Victoria S. London: Routledge, 2023.

=== Journal articles ===
- “Perichoresis and Projection: Problems with Social Doctrines of the Trinity”, New Blackfriars 81 (2000): 432–45.
- “Evil and the limits of theology”, New Blackfriars 84 (2003): 13–29.
- “Aquinas, the Trinity and the Limits of Understanding”, International Journal of Systematic Theology 7 (2005): 414–27.
- “Karl Rahner’s Ecclesiology”, New Blackfriars, Vol. 90 No. 1026 (March 2009), 188-200.
- “Is an Apophatic Trinitarianism Possible?”, International Journal of Systematic Theology 12 (2010): 65–77.
- “Beauty and Mystery in Mathematics and Theology”, Imaginatio et Ratio 2 (2013): 3–14.
- “Julian of Norwich, Hans Urs von Baltthasar, and the Status of Suffering in Christian Theology”, New Blackfriars 99 (2018): 298–311.
- "Paradox and Paul: Catholic and Protestant Theologies of Grace." International Journal of Systematic Theology 22(1)(2020): 77-82.
- Negative Theology and Meaningless Suffering. Modern Theology 36(1)(2020): 92-104.
- "Reply to Critics, a reply to six reviews of God, Evil and the Limits of Theology." Political Theology 22(5) (2021): 423-432.
