= John Bowden (theologian) =

English theologian and publisher (1935–2010)

The Reverend John Bowden
- Born: John Stephen Bowden; 17 May 1935; Halifax, England
- Died: 6 December 2010 (aged 75)
- Occupations: Cleric; publisher; theologian
- Employer: SCM Press

Ecclesiastical career
- Religion: Christianity (Anglican)
- Church: Church of England
- Ordained: 1962 (priest)

Academic background
- Education: Corpus Christi College, Oxford
- Influences: Christopher Evans

Academic work
- Discipline: Theology
- School or tradition: Liberal Christianity
- Institutions: University of Nottingham

John Stephen Bowden (17 May 1935 – 6 December 2010) was an English Anglican priest, publisher, and theologian.

== Life ==
Born on 17 May 1935 in Halifax, Yorkshire, Bowden was educated at St Paul's School, London, and Corpus Christi College, Oxford, where he came under the influence of Christopher Evans. He was ordained as a priest in the Diocese of Southwell in 1962.

Bowden was a lecturer in theology at the University of Nottingham when, in 1966, he was appointed managing director of the religious publisher SCM Press, which published works by leading continental theologians such as Martin Hengel, Gerd Theissen, Edward Schillebeeckx, Hans Küng, and Jürgen Moltmann. He held the post until his retirement in 2000.

He translated a number of theological works, including Martin Noth's Exodus, Aloys Grillmeier's Christ in Christian Tradition, Martin Hengel's Judaism and Hellenism (1975), and Henning Graf Reventlow's The Authority of the Bible and the Rise of the Modern World (1985). Winner of the Schlegel-Tieck Prize twice, for the Hengel and Graf Reventlow translations, in total Bowden translated more than 200 books and authored a number himself.

Bowden died of prostate cancer on 6 December 2010 and was survived by his wife and their three children.

Awards
| Preceded by Geoffrey Skelton | Schlegel-Tieck Prize; 1975 | Succeeded by Marian Jackson |
