= Hugh Martin (minister, born 1890) =

Hugh Martin CH (7 April 1890 Glasgow – 2 July 1964 East Grinstead) was a British Christian student leader, active in the ecumenical movement, and a publisher whose SCM Press brought out many theological books. A Baptist who was trained for the ministry and who edited their 1962 Hymn Book, he was deeply involved in the ecumenical movement, working for Christian student bodies, the British Council of Churches, and to promote reconstruction in Europe following World War II. He was appointed a Member of the Order of the Companions of Honour in 1955.

== Education ==
He was born in 1890, son of a Baptist minister. He studied at Glasgow Academy and the Royal Technical College, Glasgow. At the University of Glasgow, he won the Henderson biblical prize in 1913. He then studied theology at Baptist Theological College of Scotland, where he was awarded the Baptist Union scholarship for the highest marks.

== Career ==
He seemed set for a career in the Baptist ministry, being placed on the probationary list of ministers in 1914, and the main list in 1920. However, he chose to work with students, and in 1914 became assistant secretary of the Student Christian Movement, in charge of the organisation's publications. He was treasurer of the World Student Christian Federation from 1928 to 1935.

In 1929 he founded SCM Press as a separate company, based on the existing publications department of the Student Christian Movement. In 1937 they founded the Religious Book Club which soon had 18,000 members. Following a break due to the war, he became managing director of SCM Press in 1943.

During World War II he served in the Ministry of Information, in the religious division.

In 1943 he became Free Church leader of the British Council of Churches. Following World War II, he served on the committee of Christian Reconstruction in Europe. He was Moderator of the National Free Church Federal Council.

He edited The Baptist Hymn Book, 1962, published by the Psalms and Trust, having persuaded the Trustees to go for awholly new book rather than a revision, and co-wrote the Baptist Hymn Book Companion (1962).

== Honours ==
He became a member of the Order of the Companions of Honour in 1955.

== Works ==
=== Books ===
- The Beatitudes
- The Lord's Prayer
- The Parables of the Gospels
- Luke's Portrait of Jesus
- The Atonement
- The Meaning of the Old Testament (1925)
- Christian Counter-Attack: Europe's Churches Against Nazism (1944) (with Douglas Newton, H.M. Waddams and R.R. Williams)
- Puritanism and Richard Baxter, SCM, London, 1954

=== Hymns ===
- Christ who welcomed little children
- O God in heaven, whose loving plan
- Tell me the stories of Jesus I love to hear
