= Kathryn Tanner =

American Episcopal theologian (born 1957)

- Born: March 29, 1957 (age 69)
- Other name: Kathryn Eileen Tanner

Academic background
- Education: Yale University
- Influences: Karl Barth; Karl Rahner

Academic work
- Discipline: Theology
- Sub-discipline: Systematic theology
- School or tradition: Anglicanism; Christian feminism
- Institutions: Yale University; University of Chicago
- Doctoral students: Serene Jones; Karen Kilby; Ian A. McFarland

Kathryn Eileen Tanner (born 1957) is an Episcopal theologian who serves as the Frederick Marquand Professor of Systematic Theology at Yale Divinity School.

== Biography ==
Born on March 29, 1957, Tanner earned her BA, MA, MPhil, and PhD degrees from Yale University. Her career began at Yale by teaching for the department of religious studies. She later moved to the University of Chicago where she served as the Dorothy Grant Maclear Professor of Theology. Afterwards, she returned to teach at her alma mater.

Tanner does constructive Christian theology in both the Catholic and Protestant traditions. Her work addresses contemporary challenges to the Christian faith through the creative use of both the history of Christian thought and interdisciplinary methods, such as critical, social, and feminist theory. Her first book, God and Creation in Christian Theology developed an account of the non-competitive relations between God and creatures. Her next book The Politics of God applies non-competitive relations to the political sphere. Her book Theories of Culture: A New Agenda for Theology explores the relevance of cultural studies for rethinking theological method. She has also written a short systematic text on the Incarnation (Jesus, Humanity and the Trinity) and a text on the economic relevance of Christian beliefs about God (Economy of Grace). Christ the Key, argues for the centrality of Christ in all theological questions. Her latest book Christianity and the New Spirit of Capitalism pulls together some of her previous discussions on economy and theology and discusses the moral, social, and theological concerns with present-day "finance-dominated capitalism" and how Christian theology offers better alternatives.

She is a past president of the American Theological Society and is active in the Episcopal Church. She is a member of the Theology Committee that advises the Episcopal House of Bishops.

She is on the editorial boards of Modern Theology, International Journal of Systematic Theology, and Scottish Journal of Theology.

Tanner delivered the Warfield Lectures at Princeton Theological Seminary in 2007 and the Gifford Lectures at the University of Edinburgh in 2016, which became her 2019 book Christianity and the New Spirit of Capitalism.

== Christ the Key ==
Kathryn Tanner has done much work to contribute to the scholastic work of systematic theology. One of the most well-known works was her book called Christ the Key, published in 2010. This work is mainly Christocentric, describing Christ as center for connecting humanity with God. This book discusses the following topics in the seven chapters of the book, Human Nature, Grace (divided into 2 parts), trinitarian life, politics, death and sacrifice, and the working of the spirit. This book is best used to understand aspects of contemporary theology connected to the soul of humanity in relation with the divine humans choose to interact with. Kathryn states in the preface of this book that it is a sequel to her book Jesus, Humanity and the Trinity, continuing to explain the importance of the centrality of God seeking out humanity to be in intimate relationship with us through the life, death and resurrection of the Son, Jesus Christ. This book follows after the 2001 work to continue understanding her Christological view on God's interactions with humanity through Christ.

== The Gift of Theology ==
The Gift of Theology: The Contribution of Kathryn Tanner was put together by editors Rosemary P. Carbine and Hilda P. Koster, who were both so deeply moved and affected by Kathryn's work they decided to put together this book to best give their thanks to Kathryn Tanner for her contributions to contemporary theology. In this work, we get a much better understanding and appreciation of who Kathryn Tanner is in relation to her work as a scholar by her colleagues who admire her work most in similar fields of study. John E. Thiel, a professor of religious studies at Fairfield University, writes the foreword, describing Kathryn Tanner as "the most accomplished theologian of her generation."

This book goes on to explain in detail Kathryn Tanner's contributions and explaining the theology behind her best known works. It is a critical analysis of all her works, how she processes theology and presents them and how they have affected the theological world.

== Publications ==
- Christianity and the New Spirit of Capitalism (Yale University Press, 2019) ISBN 9780300219036
- Christ the Key (Cambridge University Press, 2010) ISBN 9780521732772
- Economy of Grace (Fortress Press, 2005) ISBN 9780800637743
- Jesus, Humanity and the Trinity: A Brief Systematic Theology (Fortress Press, 2001) ISBN 9780800632939
- Theories of Culture: A New Agenda for Theology (Fortress, 1997) ISBN 9780800630973
- The Politics of God: Christian Theologies and Social Justice (Fortress, 1992) ISBN 9781506481951
- God and Creation in Christian Theology: Tyranny or Empowerment? (Blackwell, 1988) ISBN 9780800637378

Professional and academic associations
Preceded by Max Stackhouse	President of the American Theological Society; 2009–2010	Succeeded by Peter Slater
