= SCM Press =

English London-Based Publisher

- Parent company: Hymms Ancient and Modern
- Country of origin: United Kingdom
- Headquarters location: London
- Publication types: Books
- Nonfiction topics: Theology
- Official website: scmpress.hymnsam.co.uk

SCM Press is a British publisher of theology, originally linked to the Student Christian Movement.The company was founded by Hugh Martin, a Baptist minister.

The company was purchased by Hymns Ancient and Modern in 1997.

In 2005 the company published The SCM Press AZ of Evangelical Theology. The publication was structured as an encyclopedia and covered the history of western evangelical theology and evangelicalism.

In 2018, Church Times reported that 100 titles from SCM Press and Canterbury Press lists were being made available to students through the Church of England's digital learning hub, including work by Walter Brueggemann and E. P. Sanders.

The organisation has over 50 publicly available Christian Literature Titles on their website.

== See also ==
- John Bowden (theologian)
- Category:SCM Press books
