= Elaine Graham =

British academic

Elaine Graham FBA
- Born: 1959 (age 66–67)
- Title: Grosvenor Research Professor of Practical Theology

Academic background
- Education: University of Bristol; University of Manchester
- Thesis: The Implications of Theories of Gender for Christian Pastoral Practice and Theological Formulation (1993)

Academic work
- Discipline: Theologian
- Sub-discipline: Practical theology
- Institutions: University of Manchester; University of Chester

Elaine L. Graham FBA (born 1959) is Professor Emerita of Practical theology at the University of Chester. She was until October 2009 the Samuel Ferguson Professor of Social and Pastoral Theology at the University of Manchester. In March 2014, she was installed as Canon Theologian of Chester Cathedral.

== Education ==
Elaine Graham holds a BSc (Social Science) (Hons) in Sociology and Economic and Social History (1980) from the University of Bristol, a MA in Social and Pastoral Theology from the University of Manchester (1988) and a PhD entitled "The Implications of Theories of Gender for Christian Pastoral Practice and Theological Formulation" (1993), also from Manchester.

== Career ==
After working as the Northern Regional Secretary of the Student Christian Movement (1981–84) and four years as ecumenical lay chaplain at Sheffield City Polytechnic (now Sheffield Hallam University), Elaine Graham joined the University of Manchester in 1988 as a lecturer in Social and Pastoral Theology. She was appointed to the position of Samuel Ferguson Professor of Social and Pastoral Theology, succeeding Ronald Preston (1970–81) and Tony Dyson (1981–98) in June 1998. She later held the position of Head of the School of Religions and Theology & Middle Eastern Studies from 2000 to 2004.

Elaine Graham was the President of the International Academy of Practical Theology from 2005 to 2007 and was a member of the Archbishops' Commission on Urban Life and Faith, which published the report Faithful Cities: A call for celebration, vision and justice (Methodist Publishing House, 2006).

In 2009 she moved to the Department of Theology and Religious Studies at the University of Chester as Grosvenor Research Professor in Practical Theology. In 2014 she was installed as the Canon Theologian of Chester Cathedral in a lay capacity.

She was elected a Fellow of the British Academy in 2021 and was retired at the same year.

== Published works ==
=== Books ===
This is a list of books that Graham has published or edited.

- Graham, Elaine L.; Halsey, Margaret, eds. (1993). Life-Cycles: Women and Pastoral Care. London: SPCK. ISBN 978-0-281-04688-1. OCLC 28772733.
- ——— (1995). Making the Difference: Gender, Personhood and Theology. Minneapolis, MN: Fortress Press. ISBN 978-0-800-62960-1. OCLC 32347606.
- ——— (1996). Transforming Practice: Pastoral Theology in an Age of Uncertainty (1st ed.). London; New York: Mowbray. ISBN 978-0-2646-7345-5. OCLC 35964310.
- ——— (2002). Representations of the Post/Human: Monsters, Aliens and Others in Popular Culture. Manchester studies in religion, culture and gender. Manchester: Manchester University Press. ISBN 978-0-7190-5441-9. OCLC 878532506.
- ——— (2002). Transforming Practice: Pastoral Theology in an Age of Uncertainty (2nd ed.). Eugene, OR: Wipf and Stock. ISBN 978-1-5791-0922-6. OCLC 813338640.
- ———; Walton, Heather; Ward, Frances, eds. (2005). Theological Reflection: Methods. London: SCM Press. ISBN 978-0-3340-2976-2. OCLC 62312225.
- ———; Rowlands, Anna, eds. (2005). Pathways to the Public Square: practical theology in an age of pluralism; International Academy of Practical Theology, Manchester 2003. International practical theology. Vol. 1. Münster: Lit Verlag. ISBN 978-3-8258-8423-9. OCLC 75302594.
- ———; Walton, Heather; Ward, Frances, eds. (2007). Theological Reflection: Sources. London: SCM Press. ISBN 978-0-334-02977-9.
- ———; Lowe, Stephen (2009). What Makes a Good City? Public Theology and the Urban Church. London: Darton, Longman and Todd. ISBN 978-0-2325-2748-3. OCLC 368053801.
- ——— (2009). Words Made Flesh: Writings in Pastoral and Practical Theology. London: SCM Press. ISBN 9780334041948. OCLC 271772094.
- ———, ed. (2009). Grace Jantzen: Redeeming the Present. Farnham, Surrey; Burlington, VT: Ashgate. ISBN 978-0-754-66823-7. OCLC 320696478.
- ———; Scott, Peter M.; Baker, Christopher R., eds. (2009). Remoralising Britain: Political, Ethical and Theological perspectives on New Labour. London; New York: Continuum. ISBN 978-0-8264-4414-1. OCLC 233939115.
- ——— (2013). Between a Rock and a Hard Place: Public Theology in a Post-Secular Age. London: SCM Press. ISBN 978-0-334-04598-4. OCLC 830368081.
- ———; Walton, Heather; Ward, Frances, eds. (2013). Theological Reflection: Sources 2. London: SCM Press. ISBN 978-0-3340-2977-9.

=== Selected Articles and chapters ===
In addition, she has also written a number of articles in edited volumes and academic journals.

- ——— (2012). "What's Missing? Gender, Reason and the Post-Secular". Political Theology. 13 (2): 233–45. doi:10.1558/poth.v13i2.233. hdl:10034/243153. S2CID 144943027.
- ——— (2012). "From Where Does the Red Tory Speak? Phillip Blond, Theology and Public Discourse". Political Theology. 13 (3): 292–307. doi:10.1558/poth.v13i3.292. hdl:10034/243771. S2CID 145348592.
- ——— (2012). "The Archbishop Speaks, But Who Is Listening? The Dilemmas of Public Theology Today". Ecclesiology. 8 (2): 200–222. doi:10.1163/174553112X630462.
- ——— (2013). "Is Practical Theology a form of 'Action Research'". International Journal of Practical Theology. 17 (1): 1–31.
- ——— (2015). "The Unquiet Frontier: Tracing the Boundaries of Philosophy and Public Theology". Political Theology. 16 (1): 33–46. doi:10.1179/1462317X14Z.000000000128. S2CID 141952877.
- ——— (2015). "The Medium and the Message? Notes on Pope Francis' "Theology of Communication"". Crucible: The Journal of Christian Social Ethics: 20–30.

Non-profit organization positions
Preceded by Linda Woodhead	President of Modern Church; 2019–present	Incumbent
