= Hugh Turner (theologian) =

English theologian

The Reverend Canon Professor Hugh Turner
- Canon Residentiary of Durham Cathedral
- Church: Church of England
- Diocese: Diocese of Durham
- Installed: 1950
- Retired: 1974
- Other posts: Acting Dean of Durham Cathedral (1973); Sub-Dean of Durham Cathedral (1959–1974); Van Mildert Professor of Divinity, Durham University (1958–1974); Lightfoot Professor of Divinity, Durham University (1950–1958)

Orders
- Ordination: 1931 (deacon); 1932 (priest)

Personal details
- Born: Henry Ernest William Turner; 14 January 1907 Sheffield, Yorkshire, England
- Died: 14 December 1995 (aged 88) Cumbria, England
- Education: King Edward VII School, Sheffield
- Alma mater: St John's College, Oxford; Wycliffe Hall, Oxford; Lincoln College, Oxford
- Military career
- Allegiance: United Kingdom
- Branch: Royal Air Force Volunteer Reserve
- Service years: 1940–1945
- Rank: Squadron leader
- Unit: Chaplains Branch
- Conflicts: Second World War

Henry Ernest William "Hugh" Turner (14 January 1907 – 14 December 1995) was a British Anglican priest, theologian, and academic.

Having served his curacy in the Diocese of Carlisle, Turner spent most of the next four decades of his ordained ministry as a scholar priest. From 1935 to 1950, he served as a fellow and tutor in theology at Lincoln College, Oxford: he also held other appointments at his college, including chaplain, librarian and senior tutor. He served as a Royal Air Force Volunteer Reserve chaplain during the Second World War.

In 1950, Tutner moved to Durham in North East England, where he joined its university as Lightfoot Professor of Divinity and its cathedral as a Canon Residentiary. He changed chairs in 1958, and served as Van Mildert Professor of Divinity until his retirement in 1974. He additionally served as Sub-Dean of Durham Cathedral from 1959 to 1974.

== Early life and education ==
Turner was born on 14 January 1907 in Sheffield, Yorkshire, England. He was educated at King Edward VII School, then an all-boys school in Sheffield. He studied Mods and Literae Humaniores (i.e. classics) at St John's College, Oxford, and graduated with a first class Bachelor of Arts (BA) degree in 1929: as per tradition, his BA was promoted to a Master of Arts (MA Oxon) degree in 1933. He then entered Wycliffe Hall, Oxford, an evangelical Anglican theological college, to train for ordained ministry and to study theology. Following ordination, he continued his studies at Lincoln College, Oxford, and completed a Bachelor of Divinity (BD) degree in 1940 and a Doctor of Divinity (DD) degree in 1955.

== Career ==
Turner was ordained in the Church of England as a deacon in 1931 and a priest in 1932. From 1931 to 1934, he served his curacy at Christ Church, Cockermouth in the Diocese of Carlisle.

In 1935, Turner was elected a fellow of Lincoln College, Oxford. There, between 1935 and 1950, he served as chaplain and was a college tutor in theology. During World War II, he took a break from academia to serve as a military chaplain. On 29 July 1940, he was commissioned into the Chaplains Branch of the Royal Air Force Volunteer Reserve (RAFVR) and granted the relative rank of squadron leader. He was posted abroad and saw active service in the Middle East. He was demobbed in 1945, and returned to the University of Oxford. He additionally served as librarian of Lincoln College from 1945 to 1948, and as its senior tutor from 1948 to 1950.

In 1950, Turner moved to Durham University where he had been appointed Lightfoot Professor of Divinity. In 1950 or 1951, he was also appointed a canon residentiary of Durham Cathedral in the Diocese of Durham. He gave the Bampton Lectures at the University of Oxford in 1954: the lecture series was titled "The Pattern of Christian Truth: A Study in the Relations Between Orthodoxy and Heresy in the Early Church". In 1958, he moved chairs and became Van Mildert Professor of Divinity. He was additionally appointed sub-dean of Durham Cathedral in 1959, and served as its acting dean in 1973.

Turner retired from academia and full-time ministry in 1974. He then was appointed Van Mildert Professor Emeritus by Durham University and Canon Emeritus by Durham Cathedral.

== Later life ==
Turner held permission to officiate in the Diocese of Carlisle between 1977 and 1995. The parish church at which he assisted during retirement was in the Anglo-Catholic tradition, although Turner himself was an evangelical Anglican. He lived in Eskdale, Cumbria.

Turner died on 14 December 1995, aged 88.

== Personal life ==
In 1936, Turner married Constance Parker. Together they had two sons. He was known as "Grandpa Smokey" due to frequent pipe-smoking.

== Selected works ==
- Turner, H. E. W. (1952). The patristic doctrine of redemption: a study of the development of doctrine during the first five centuries. London: Mowbray.
- Turner, H. E. W. (1955). The pattern of Christian truth: a study in the relations between orthodoxy and heresy in the early church. London: Mowbray.
- Turner, H. E. W. (1959). The meaning of the Cross. London: Mowbray.
- Turner, H. E. W.; Montefiore, Hugh (1962). Thomas and the Evangelists. London: SCM Press.
- Turner, H. E. W. (1963). Historicity and the Gospels: a sketch of historical method and its application to the Gospels. London: Mowbray. ISBN 978-0264651507.
- Turner, H. E. W. (1976). Jesus the Christ. London: Mowbrays.
