= Adam Storey Farrar =

English churchman and academic

Adam Storey Farrar, DD (1826–1905) was an English churchman and academic, Professor of Divinity and Ecclesiastical History at the University of Durham from 1864.

== Life ==
Born in London on 20 April 1820, he was son of Abraham Eccles Farrar, president of the Wesleyan conference, by his second wife, Elizabeth, daughter of Adam Storey of Leeds. Educated at the Liverpool Institute, he matriculated in 1844 at St. Mary Hall, Oxford, obtaining a first class in the final classical school and a second in mathematics, and graduating B.A. in 1850. In 1851 he was the first winner of the prize founded in memory of Thomas Arnold, with an essay on The Causes of the Greatness and Decay of the Town of Carthage, and in the following year proceeded M.A. and was elected Michel fellow of The Queen's College. In two successive years, 1853 and 1854, he won the Denyer prize for a theological essay, on The Doctrine of the Trinity, and Original Sin.

Ordained deacon in 1852 and priest in 1853, Farrar became tutor at Wadham College in 1855, and acted both as mathematical moderator and examiner in classics in 1856. He was appointed preacher at the Chapel Royal, Whitehall (1858) and Bampton lecturer (1862); and became B.D. and D.D. in 1864.

In 1864 Farrar was appointed professor at Durham, and in 1878 he became canon of Durham Cathedral. He was elected an honorary fellow of Queen's College, Oxford in late 1902.

Farrar married in 1864 Sarah Martha Wood (1824–1905), daughter of Robert Wood, a Wesleyan minister. He died at Durham on 11 June 1905, without issue.

== Works ==
While at Oxford Farrar published his major work, Science in Theology, Sermons before the University of Oxford, in 1859, followred by A Critical History of Free Thought, the Bampton Lectures in 1862. In the former he sought "to bring some of the discoveries and methods of the physical and moral sciences to bear upon theoretic questions of theology".

== Notes ==
Attribution

This article incorporates text from a publication now in the public domain: Lee, Sidney, ed. (1895). "Farrar, Adam Storey". Dictionary of National Biography. Vol. 42. London: Smith, Elder & Co.
