= Lightfoot Professor of Divinity =

Academic position at Durham University, England

The Lightfoot Professor of Divinity is a professorship or chair in the Department of Theology and Religion at Durham University. The chair is named after the former Bishop of Durham J. B. Lightfoot. The current holder is Grant Macaskill.

Since 1832 the chair in Greek and Classical Literature at the university was also a canon professorship. This canonry was transferred to the Lightfoot Professor of Divinity in 1943. The professorship was attached to the canonry until 1985, when the non-Anglican James Dunn was appointed.

== Lightfoot Professor of Divinity ==
- The Rev Canon Professor Stanley Lawrence Greenslade (1943–1950)
- The Rev Canon Professor Hugh Turner (1950–1958)
- The Rev Canon Professor Christopher Evans (1959–1962)
- The Rev Canon Professor R. P. C. Hanson (1962–1964)
- The Rev Canon Professor Douglas Rawlinson Jones, Old Testament (1964–1985)
- Abeyance (1985 - 1990)
- James D. G. Dunn, New Testament (1990–2003)
- John M. G. Barclay, New Testament (2003–2025)
- Grant Macaskill New Testament (2025 to present)

== See also ==
- Bede Professor of Catholic Theology
- Van Mildert Professor of Divinity
