= Grant Macaskill =

Theologian

Grant Macaskill is a Scottish New Testament scholar and Lightfoot Professor of Divinity at Durham University.

== Career ==
Macaskill completed his PhD ("Wisdom and Apocalyptic in the Gospel of Matthew: A Comparative Study with 1 Enoch and 4QInstruction") in 2005 at the University of St Andrews where he studied under Richard Bauckham. He then stayed on at St Andrews as a British Academy postdoctoral fellow (2005-2007), lecturer in New Testament Studies (2007-2012), and senior lecturer in New Testament Studies (2012-2015). In 2015 he was appointed to the Kirby Laing Chair of New Testament Exegesis at the University of Aberdeen. His research engages with the New Testament as a coherent body of theological literature emerging from the diverse contexts of late Second Temple Judaism. His publications have included extensive treatments of theological issues in the New Testament, notably 'Union with Christ', and detailed examination of the transmission of Jewish apocalyptic texts in Christian tradition, particularly 1 Enoch and 2 Enoch. He has completed a study of 'The New Testament and Intellectual Humility', funded by Saint Louis University and the John Templeton Foundation, which was published in 2018. He is also contracted to write a two-volume theological commentary on Romans for the International Theological Commentary Series (T&T Clark). In 2024 Macaskill was awarded a Leverhulme Trust Major Research Fellowship. His project is titled, "The Biblical Pseudepigrapha and Eclectic Philosophical Cultures in Antiquity".

In May 2025, Macaskill was announced as the next Lightfoot Professor of Divinity at Durham University. He took up the position in September 2025.

== Selected works ==
- Macaskill, Grant (2007). Revealed Wisdom and Inaugurated Eschatology in Ancient Judaism and Early Christianity. Supplements to the Study of Judaism 115. Leiden: Brill.
- ——— (2013). The Slavonic Texts of 2 Enoch. Studia Judaeoslavica 6. Leiden: Brill.
- ——— (2013). Union with Christ in the New Testament. Oxford: Oxford University Press.
- ——— (2018). The New Testament and Intellectual Humility. Oxford: Oxford University Press.
- ——— (2019). Living in Union with Christ: Paul's Gospel and Christian Moral Identity. Grand Rapids, MI: Baker Academic.
- ——— (2019). Autism and the Church. Waco, TX: Baylor University Press.
- ——— (2024). The Entangled Enoch: 2 Enoch and the Cultures of Late Antiquity. Studia in Veteris Testamenti Pseudepigrapha 28. Leiden: Brill.
