= Laura Veale =

British female doctor

Dr Laura Veale FRSM
- Laura Veale, before 1939
- Born: 30 August 1867; Hampsthwaite, West Riding of Yorkshire, England
- Died: 14 August 1963 (aged 95); Knaresborough, West Riding of Yorkshire, England
- Education: London Royal Free Hospital School of Medicine for Women
- Occupation: Physician
- Years active: 1904–1936
- Known for: First Yorkshire-born woman to become a doctor
- Medical career
- Field: General practitioner; gynaecologist; obstetrician
- Institutions: Leeds Hospital for Women and Children; Harrogate Infirmary
- Sub-specialties: promotion of the welfare of women and children

Laura Sobey Veale (30 August 1867 – 14 August 1963), known as Dr Laura, was an English general practitioner, gynaecologist, and obstetrician. She was the first Yorkshire-born woman to become a doctor. She was refused entry to Leeds School of Medicine, even though the Leeds Mercury published letters of complaint about her treatment. With encouragement from Elizabeth Garrett Anderson and support from a local boys' school she was finally accepted at the London Royal Free Hospital School of Medicine for Women, and qualified with a Bachelor of Medicine (MB) degree at the age of 37.

Veale was the first woman resident officer at the Hospital for Women and Children in Leeds. She opened her surgery in Harrogate, becoming the first female physician in the town. She set up a dispensary, which was to become a foundational element of the Women and Children's Department of Harrogate Infirmary. While employed there, she worked towards the foundation of a maternity department, although that did not materialise until after her retirement. She was, however, appointed physician under the Maternity and Infant Welfare Scheme during the First World War. She founded a clinic for children in Harrogate, which is now run by the National Health Service. She also set up an antenatal clinic in the town, and was appointed medical officer in the Municipal Babies' Hospital. Besides her medical work, she was a suffragette, and worked as a member of the Women's Voluntary Service in the Second World War.

== Background ==
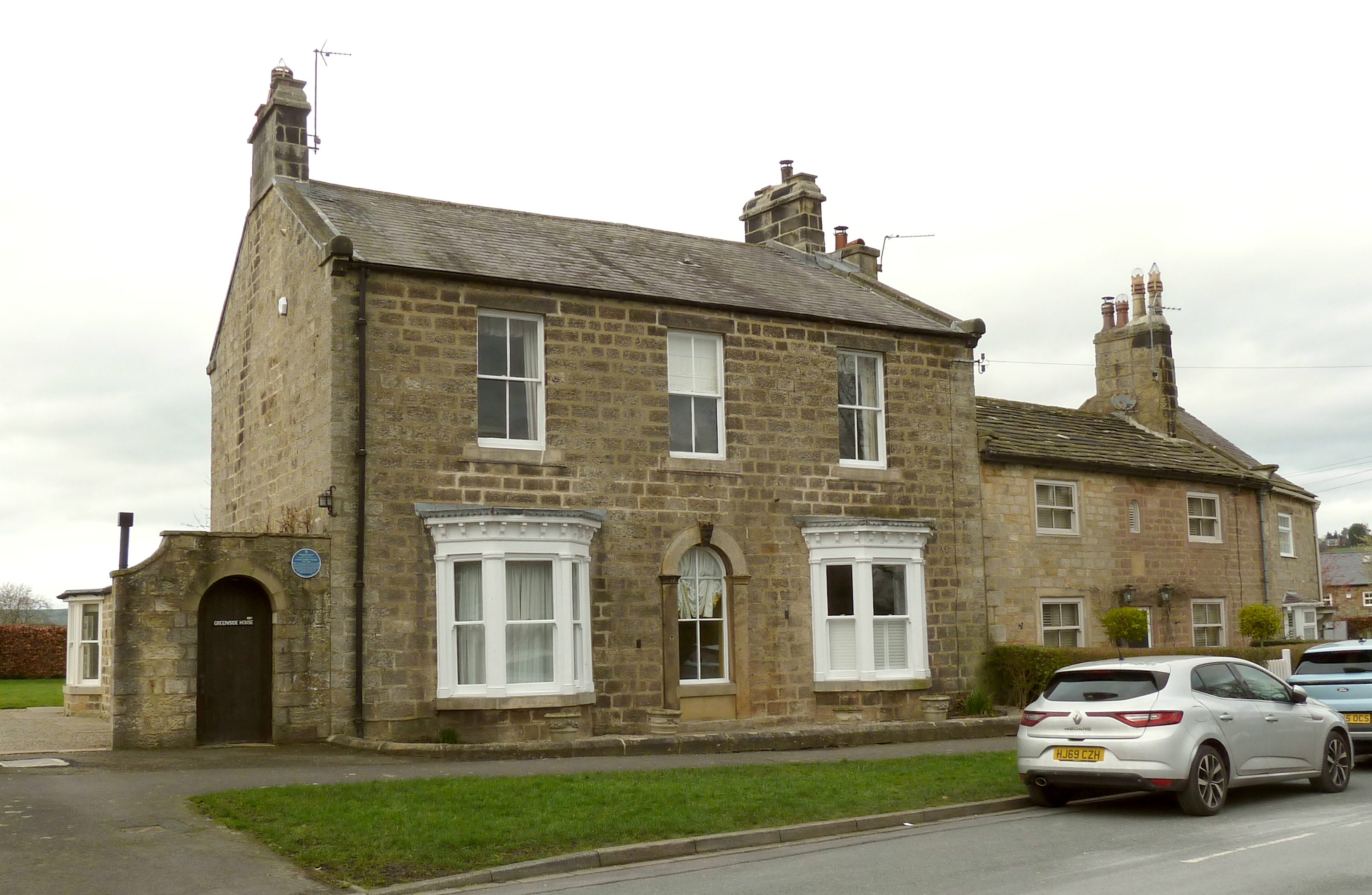
Greenside House, where Veale was born

Veale was born into "a medical family, associated in particular with the Leeds School of Medicine". Her father was Harrogate general practitioner Dr Richard Sobey Veale, (Note: Richard Sobey Veale (7 September 1840 – 26 April 1889), was born in Maker, Cornwall. GRO index: Births Dec 1840 Veale Richard Sobey St Germans IX 89. Deaths Jun 1889 Veale Richard Sobey 48 Knaresbro' 9a 72.) who, like his daughter, had to travel hundreds of miles for his qualifications, having been born in Maker, Cornwall, and trained at Edinburgh. Veale's mother was Laura Veale née de Paiva. (Note: Laura Veale née de Paiva.(1833–1915). GRO index: Marriages Dec 1866 Veale Richard S and de Paiva Laura. Islington 1b 550. Deaths Mar 1915 Veale Laura 81 Knaresbro 9a 161.) Veale was the eldest of six Hampsthwaite-born siblings. The other five were: Constance Ernestina Veale, (Note: Constance Ernestina Veale (born 1869). GRO index: Births Mar 1869 Veale Constance Ernestina Knaresbro' 9a 108.) Dr Henry de Paiva B. Veale, (Note: Henry de Paiva B. Veale (1871–1952). GRO index: Births Mar 1871 Veale Henry De Paiva B. Knaresbro' 9a 103. Deaths Jun 1952 Veale Henry de P.B. 81 Wharfedale 2d 654.) Dr Rawdon Augustus Veale, consulting physician to Leeds General Infirmary and father of a doctor, (Note: Rawdon Augustus Veale (1873–1954). GRO index: Births Jun 1873 Veale Rawdon Augustus Knaresbro' 9a 101. Deaths Sep 1954 Veale Rawdon A. 81 Cheltenham 7b 284.) Margaret Christina Veale, (Note: Margaret Christina Veale (born 1875). GRO index: Births Jun 1875 Veale Margaret Christina Knaresbro' 9a 116.) and accountant Gerald Cater Veale, (Note: Gerald Cater Veale (born 1877). GRO index: Births Mar 1877 Veale Gerald Cater Knaresbro' 9a 114.) who was pro-chancellor of the University of Leeds. Veale was born on 30 August 1867, in Greenside House which still stands opposite the village school in Hampsthwaite. (Note: Laura Sobey Veale (1867–1963). GRO index: Births Sep 1867 Veale Laura Sobey. Knaresbro' 9a 101. Deaths Sep 1963 Veale Laura S. 95 Claro 2C 114.) In 1871 the family was still in Hampsthwaite. By 1881 the family was living in Victoria Park, Bilton, Harrogate, where Veale's childhood was spent.

Veale's father was a respected figure who died suddenly at the age of 48. At his Harrogate funeral his hearse was followed by "an exceedingly large concourse of townspeople", and the procession was headed by the police, and followed by members of the town council, the legal profession and the medical profession, 100 members of the Conservative Club, the Primrose League, the borough justices, the mayor of Harrogate, and representatives of the Freemasons. Veale, aged 21, rode in the first carriage with her siblings, the youngest of whom was 12 years old. They were followed by more than 20 private carriages. En route to Harrogate Cemetery, shops were closed, blinds were drawn, and flags lowered to half mast. At the funeral, the many wreaths hid the coffin. The Western Morning News said, "It was the largest funeral seen in Harrogate for several years". In 1891 the census finds Veale living in Rosebury (house), Bilton, with her widowed mother, three siblings and two servants. Like Veale's father, her mother also had a large funeral, including among the many mourners doctor Wilfrid Edgecombe and his wife.

Veale never married. She died at Scotton Banks Hospital, Knaresborough, on 14 August 1963, aged 95 years. She left £28,197 17s (equivalent to £515,036 in 2025).

== Career ==
=== Training ===
Veale was inspired to become a doctor by her father's example, and she was supported in her ambition by her brothers. However it was difficult for women to qualify as doctors during Veale's youth, and she was "denied entry" to the Leeds School of Medicine. She applied to that institution in 1897. When refused, she wrote back:

It seems only reasonable that I who have been a student of the college for the past two sessions, should have the same facilities for continuing the medical course as the men who have been my fellow students for that time.

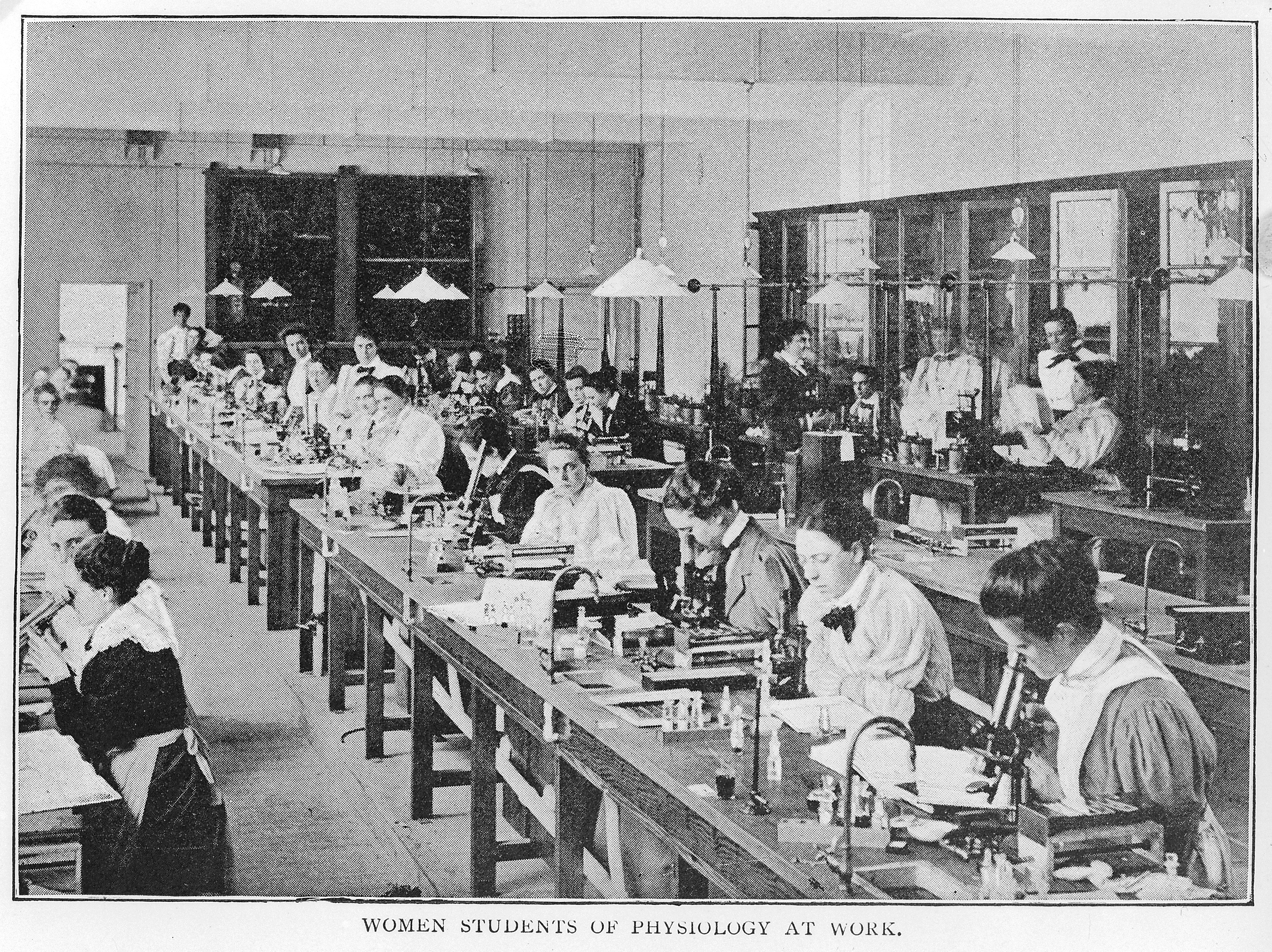
London School of Medicine for Women, 1899

The medical school board for the institution noted that it would be "impossible" for Veale to attend the classes required for qualification. The Leeds Mercury published letters of complaint about her exclusion from training. Harrogate historian Paul Jennings has said, "In the late 19th century there was still a stigma, and a considerable amount of opposition to women entering medicine, which is made evident by [Veale's] rejection from Leeds Medical School". However she "overcame strong hostility from the medical profession". To pass the London Matriculation, she studied at the Yorkshire College, an early incarnation of the University of Leeds. Veale was encouraged by George Mearns Savery, the headmaster of Harrogate College, a local boys' school, (Note: George Mearns Savery was the headmaster of Harrogate College, a private boys' school which closed sometime after 1903 and a different establishment from the present Harrogate College, and also started Harrogate Ladies College (a private girls' school).) and also prepared for her matriculation by studying mathematics and other subjects with the sixth-form pupils at the school. She also received encouragement from Elizabeth Garrett Anderson. She visited London in an attempt to study at the more liberal-minded London Royal Free Hospital School of Medicine for Women, then the only medical school for women in England. She entered the institution, and the 1901 census finds her as a 33-year-old student living in St Pancras, London. She qualified with a Bachelor of Medicine (MB) degree in 1904. Veale was the first Yorkshire-born woman to become a doctor. Graham Chalmers of the Harrogate Advertiser wrote that Veale "was a formidable character" by all reports, who "fought against strong opposition to women in the medical profession, and by the time of the Edwardian era had succeeded". From 1914, female medical students were allowed in the entirety of the surgical outpatient department at Leeds Infirmary.

=== Professional work ===
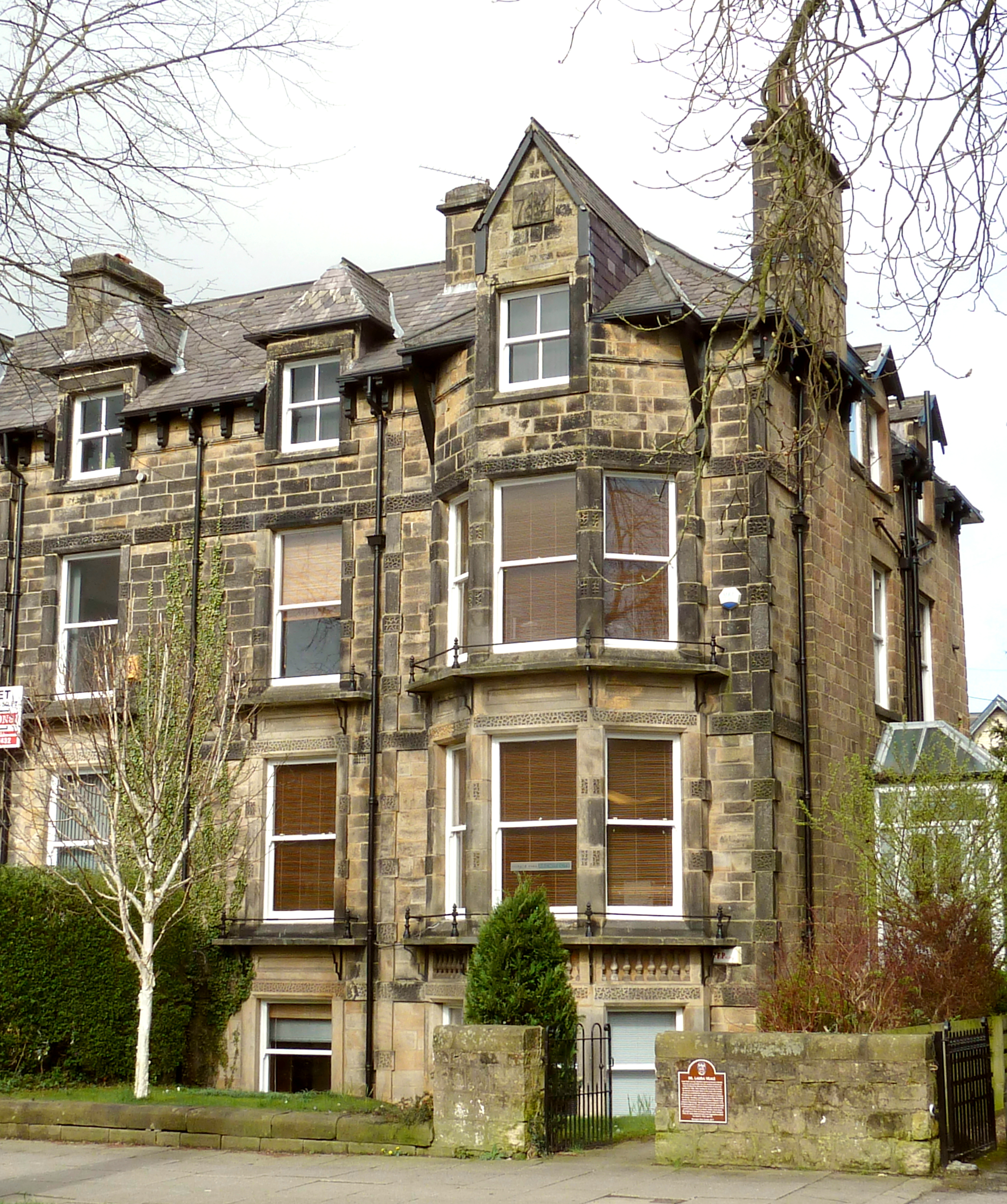
Location of Veale's surgery in Harrogate

Veale spent the first half-year of her career in Leeds as the first woman resident officer at the Hospital for Women and Children, where under her watch the number of registered children increased from 75 to 375. In 1904 she set up as a general practitioner (GP) at 3 Victoria Avenue, Harrogate. At that point she became the first woman doctor in Harrogate. By 1911, Veale was living and working at 23 York Place, Harrogate, which was listed as an eleven-room house, with three servants. Her speciality was promoting the welfare of children and women. In the New Park area of Harrogate she set up a dispensary or consulting room, which was later to act as a foundation for the Women and Children's Department of Harrogate Infirmary.

In 1913, Veale was hired as a gynaecologist, and then in 1934 consulting obstetrician at Harrogate Infirmary. At the time, the institution had a rule which prevented pregnant women from being admitted, and Veale spent a quarter of a century fighting for them to create a maternity department, which was finally instigated in 1937, the year after she retired. In 1916 Veale was appointed Physician under the Maternity and Infant Welfare Scheme, for which she was paid a salary of £100 (equivalent to £7,521 in 2025) per annum. She also worked to create an infants' welfare centre. That did not materialise at the hospital, but at the former St George's Convalescent Home, 2 Dragon Parade, Harrogate, where an NHS clinic for children still exists. Under Veale it was a centre for maternity and child welfare. Veale had promoted the scheme for that address so that the Local Government Board gave a grant of £214 16s 5d. (equivalent to £10,554 in 2025) for the years 1918–1919. The centre opened in March 1920, but Harrogate Council did not purchase the building until 16 June 1921. Veale set up an antenatal clinic in Harrogate, and became the medical officer in the Municipal Babies' Hospital. In Harrogate, Veale was known as "Dr Laura". She retired in 1936. In that year she was elected an honorary life patron of Harrogate and District General Hospital, "in appreciation of her services to the hospital" She was the first female member of the hospital staff (not counting the nurses) and was instrumental in the raising of funds for the maternity block.

== Institutions ==
Veale was a member of the Leeds and West Riding Chirurgical Society, and was a Fellow of the Royal Society of Medicine, representing the provinces beyond London. She was a member of the National Union of Women's Suffrage Societies. She attended one of their marches which passed through Harrogate in 1913, and founded, and became president of, the Harrogate branch of the National Council of Women. Before and after retirement, Veale still supported many local organisations. She set up the Yorkshire Children's Jewel Fund in 1917. This was a basis for the creation of child welfare organisations in the three Ridings of Yorkshire. In the Yorkshire Council for Cripples she was a founder member. She also belonged to the Yorkshire Council of the Empire Cancer Campaign. Veale was "a founder member and president of the Harrogate Women's Luncheon Club, and was a Division Commissioner of the Girl Guides for 23 years ... She formed and trained the first Red Cross detachment in the district". During the 1953 flood disaster, Veale allowed part of her home in Springfield Avenue to become a collection centre for clothing and bedding for flood relief for those people rendered homeless. In 1954, Veale served on the Avondale Trust committee which was dedicated to setting up a home for the aged and destitute in the former Avondale Hotel in Harrogate.

== Second World War ==
In the Second World War, Veale organised the Women's Voluntary Service corps for Harrogate, which she ran between 1938 and 1952. The 1939 Register finds her living at 5 Spring Avenue, Harrogate, with her cook. According to historian Malcolm Neesam, Veale was, "someone who tackled everything with vast amounts of enthusiasm. During the war, [she] led the campaign in Harrogate to collect scrap metal to use in the war effort. She would ride through town in a car pulled by local Scouts, shouting out at the top of her voice".

== Commemoration and assessment ==
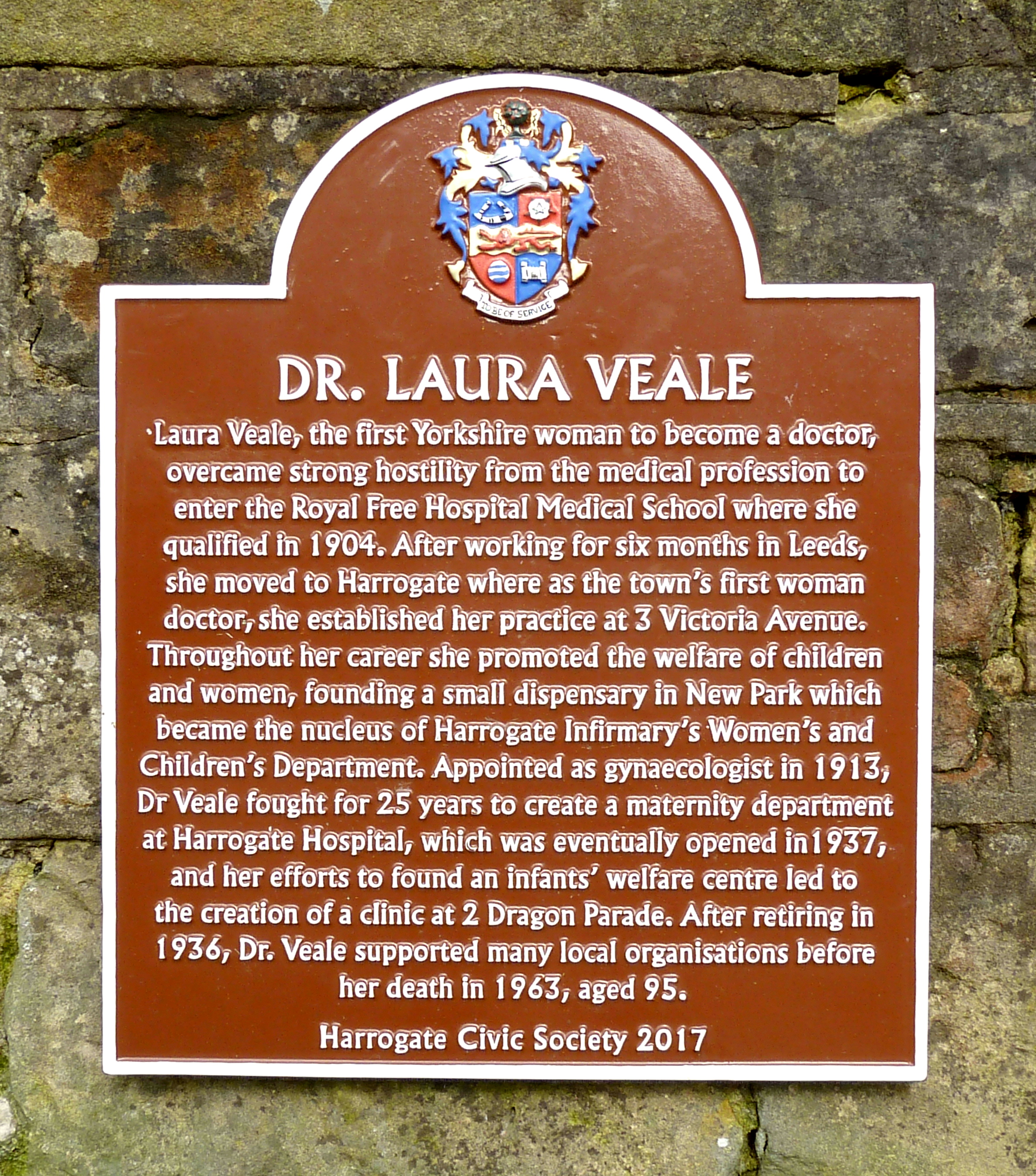
The Laura Sobey Veale brown plaque

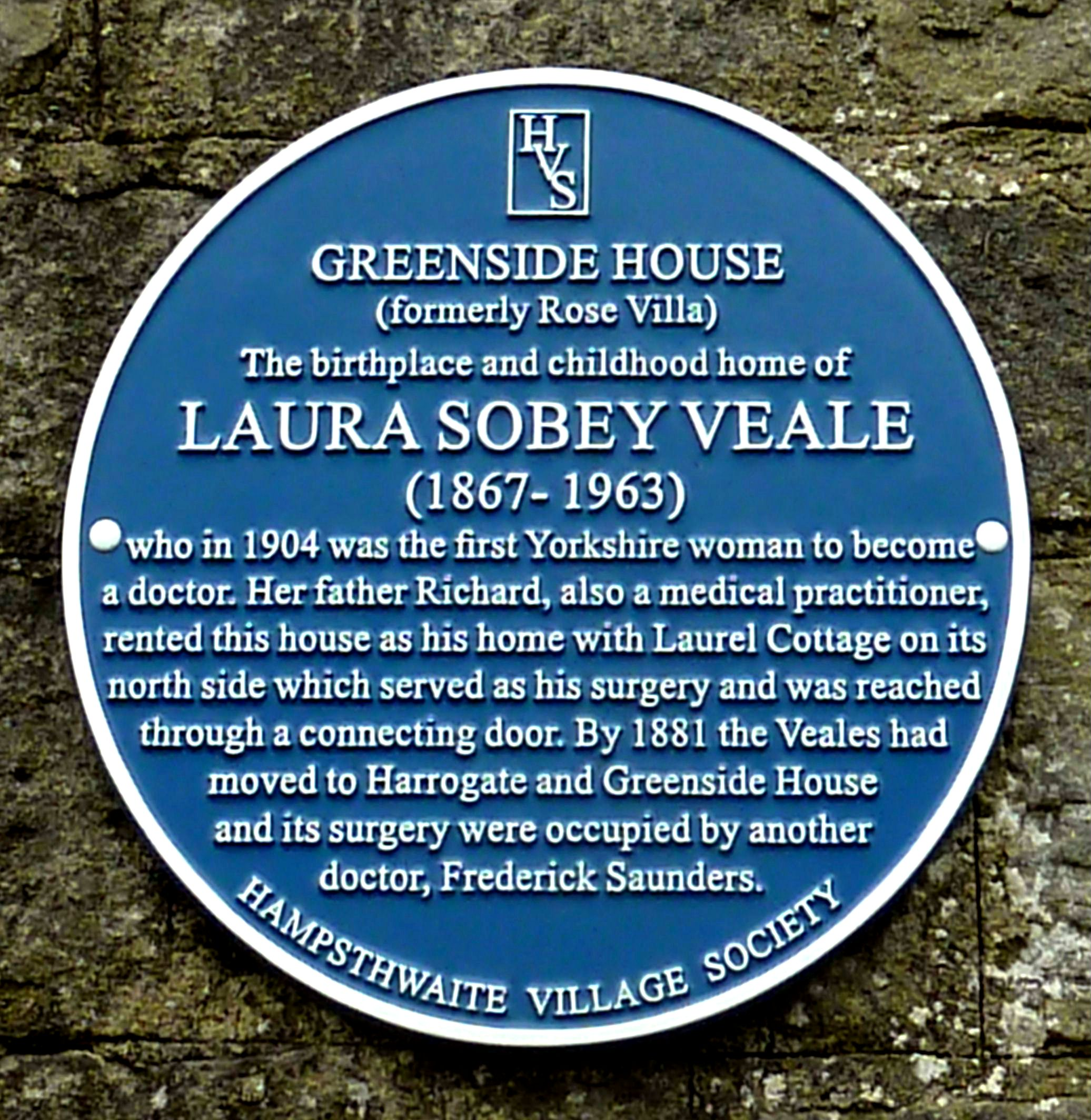
Veale's blue plaque in Hampsthwaite

In 1946, following her efforts during the Second World War, Veale was presented with a silver cigarette case "as a token of admiration and affection" by the Harrogate women's organisations. In 2017, Veale was described by The Yorkshire Post as a "pioneering doctor". "Veale's achievements were ... acknowledged by North Yorkshire County Council's Sons and Daughters Campaign which saw the clinician make the top ten in their public vote". She "took the number one spot as one of North Yorkshire's most influential figures in medicine". The British Medical Journal described her as "a very remarkable woman who during the past half-century had a considerable influence on life in Harrogate and beyond that in her native Yorkshire". The Times echoed that sentiment, saying: "For a woman who never held any important administrative post as president of this or chairman of that body, her impact on her profession and on social medicine was remarkable". Veale's work included recognition of the needs of "those from the more deprived parts of Yorkshire". Carl Les, the leader of North Yorkshire County Council, said: "Figures such as Laura Veale are incredibly important to the county. She showed determination and dedication not to give up in difficult times". Dr Paul Jennings of Harrogate Civic Society said:

[Veale] deserves recognition as an important figure in the history of both medicine and feminism, and a key figure in medical provision, especially for women and infants, in her native county [of the North and West Ridings of Yorkshire], and more particularly Harrogate. It is as a pioneering woman in the medical profession, in her work for medical provision in Harrogate, particularly for women and children, and through her wider work for the community that she is so important to Harrogate.

Journalist Fiona Callow of the Stray Ferret said that Veale was a "high flyer", a "trailblazer in [her] field" and an "important figure in the local community", comparing her to her fellow Harrogate physician Kathleen Rutherford. In January 2023, Malcolm Neesam, Harrogate Civic Society and Harrogate Medical Society affixed a brown plaque in celebration of Veale on the building wherein she established her surgery, at 3 Victoria Avenue. In the same month, a blue plaque in commemoration of Veale was placed on the house in Hampsthwaite where she was born, and unveiled by the chair of Hampsthwaite and District NHS Foundation Trust.
