= Kathleen Rutherford =

British physician (1896–1975

Dr Kathleen Rutherford MBE
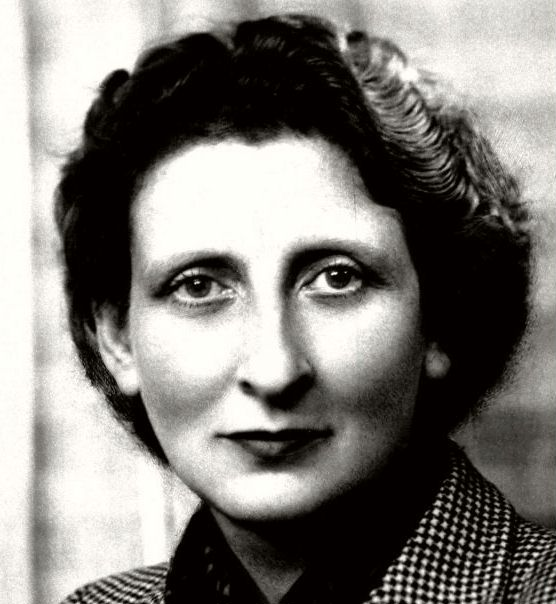
- Rutherford, c. 1940
- Born: 19 June 1896; Glasgow, Lanarkshire, Scotland
- Died: 9 November 1975 (aged 79); Harrogate, North Yorkshire, England
- Education: Queen Margaret College, Glasgow; University of Leeds
- Occupations: Physician; philanthropist; humanitarian aid worker
- Years active: 1921–1975
- Medical career
- Profession: Senior house officer; general practitioner (GP)
- Institutions: Lonsdale Hospital, Barrow-in-Furness; GP surgery, York Rd, Harrogate

Kathleen Eleanor Hyde Rutherford (19 June 1896 – 9 November 1975) was a Scottish-born medical practitioner, philanthropist and humanitarian aid worker. She was for many years a general practitioner (GP) in Harrogate, West Yorkshire, England. She was known locally as Doctor Kathleen and Doctor Kindly Heart.

Rutherford trained as a physician in Glasgow and Leeds, gained experience as a senior house surgeon in the North Lonsdale Hospital in Barrow-in-Furness, and settled as a GP in her family's practice in Harrogate. From that base, she gave a third of her earnings to charity, and when she received a sizeable legacy, she gave much of it away to deserving causes, her priority always being the needs of women and children. With the remainder of the legacy, she funded her own travel for purposes of humanitarian aid abroad and the promotion of peace campaigns.

Rutherford established the Harrogate branch of Lepra, a leprosy charity. She was president of the Yorkshire Association of Medical Women and was the founder president of the Soroptimist Club of Harrogate. Towards the end of her life she was honoured as a Member of the Most Excellent Order of the British Empire (MBE) for "services to medical work in underdeveloped countries" and was made an honorary Freeman of the Borough of Harrogate. Her private life went unnoticed by some; she married in 1929, but some newspapers described her as a spinster in her later years.

== Background ==
=== Family of physicians ===
Rutherford was born into a family of doctors. Her uncle was Dr John James Rutherford of Shipley, West Yorkshire. (Note: John James Rutherford, K.E.H. Rutherford's uncle (c.1850 – Shipley 22 July 1905). GRO index: Deaths Sep 1905 Rutherford John James 50 N.Bierley 9b 118.) Her cousin, Percy Rutherford of Shipley, son of John James Rutherford, was also a doctor of medicine. (Note: Percy Rutherford, K.E.H. Rutherford's cousin (c.1885 – Sleaford 9 March 1936). GRO index: Deaths Mar 1936 Rutherford Percival T. 51 Sleaford 7a 586.) Rutherford's father, uncle and cousin were of Scottish extraction, were all doctors, and were all tall men. Her uncle John James Rutherford was 6 ft 5 in (1,960 mm), her cousin Percy Rutherford was 6 ft 3 in (1,900 mm), and her father James Rutherford was 6 ft 2 in (1,880 mm).

Rutherford's father was Scottish physician James Rutherford, who was born in Kirkmichael, Dumfriesshire. (Note: James Rutherford, K.E.H. Rutherford's father (Dumfriesshire circa 1860 – Harrogate10 March 1936). GRO index: Deaths Mar 1936 Rutherford James 77 Knaresbro' 9a 169.) He received two honours degrees from the University of Glasgow, and initially practised in the city. He then moved to England in 1903, and assisted his brother John James Rutherford at his surgery in Shipley, subsequently running his own practice in Harrogate, where he was known as a spa specialist. Between 1905 and 1908, and from 1910 to 1930, he served on Harrogate Town Council, retiring from medicine in 1930. Rutherford's mother was Amy Eleanor Hyde Rutherford née Parker, a Doctor of Philosophy who was born in Sheffield, West Yorkshire. (Note: Amy Eleanor Hyde Rutherford née Parker, K.E.H. Rutherford's mother (Sheffield 18 February 1873 – Harrogate 29 December 1956). GRO index: Deaths Dec 1956 Rutherford Amy E.H. 83 Claro 2c 114.) Her degree was received from Webster University, in Georgia and Delaware. According to the Bradford Observer, Amy Rutherford's grandfather was "the painter of the noted picture of Grace Darling"; three noted painters of Darling, among others, are William Bell Scott, Thomas Musgrave Joy and John Wilson Carmichael. (Note: The relationship of Amy E.H. Parker to William Bell Scott is not clear, since according to records, neither Scott's wife nor his mistress Alice Boyd were known to have had issue. However, Thomas Musgrave Joy had a daughter Mary Eliza Haweis, who married, and John Wilson Carmichael also had issue who married.)

=== Rutherford's birth, marriage and death ===
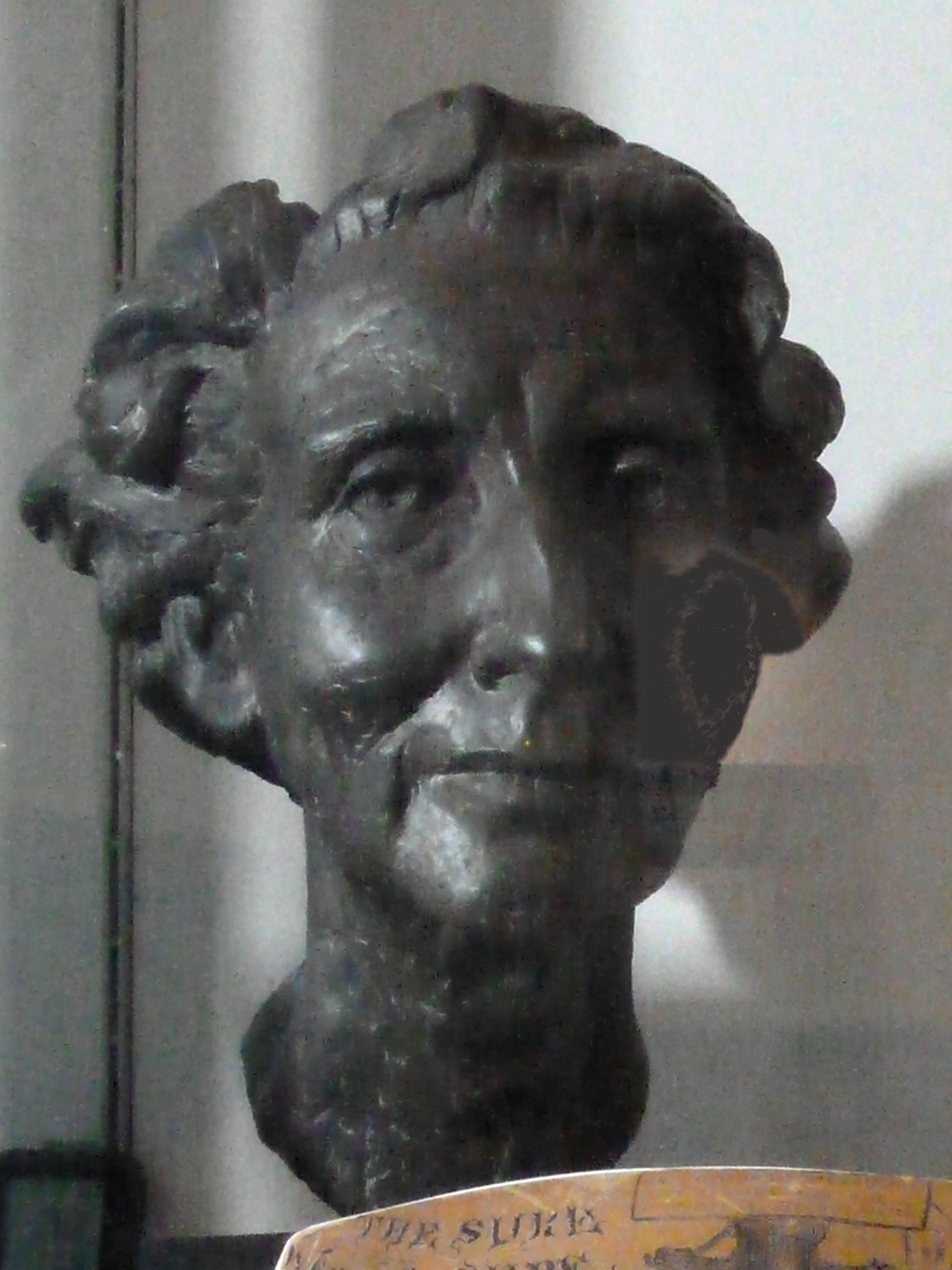
Head of Kathleen Rutherford by Kenneth Pigott, c.1970

Rutherford was born in Glasgow, the eldest of five siblings. (Note: Kathleen Eleanor Hyde Rutherford (Glasgow 19 June 1896 – Harrogate 9 November 1975). GRO index: Deaths Dec 1975 Rutherford Kathleen Eleanor H. 19JE1896 Claro 2 2013. Cremated at Stonefall Cemetery, Harrogate, her ashes being scattered there; no gravestone/memorial..) Her family moved to England early on, so that she grew up there at a time when few women could qualify as medical doctors, and none in the United Kingdom had the vote. Her siblings were: Dorothy Elspeth Agnes Rutherford, (Note: Dorothy Elspeth Agnes Rutherford, K.E.H. Rutherford's sister (Glasgow 14 November 1898 – Harrogate 3 March 1939). GRO index: Deaths Mar 1939 Rutherford Dorothy E. A. 41 Knaresbro' 9a 156.) Dr Raphael Perlee James Rutherford, (Note: Raphael Perlee James Rutherford, K.E.H. Rutherford's brother (Glasgow 6 February 1899 – Harrogate 24 February 1958). GRO index: Deaths Mar 1958 Rutherford Raphael P. J. 59 Claro 2c 127.) Almer Jan Robert Rutherford, (Note: Almer Jan Robert Rutherford, K.E.H. Rutherford's brother (Glasgow 1901 – 1906).) and surgeon Eric Hugo Thomas Rutherford, F.R.C.S., (Note: Eric Hugo Thomas Rutherford, K.E.H. Rutherford's brother (Glasgow 11 March 1903 – Harrogate 18 September 1959). GRO index: Deaths Sep 1959 Rutherford Eric H.T. 56 Claro 2c 90.) In 1934, Rutherford and her brother Raphael suffered an investment fraud committed by Harrogate stock and share broker Charles A. Mantle, but they sued and won compensation.

On 29 June 1929 in Marylebone, Rutherford married Dr Donald James Brims, M.R.C.S., L.R.C.P., of Wimpole Street, London, (Note: Donald James Brims, K.E.H. Rutherford's husband (St Saviour 3 September 1885 – Uxbridge 31 July 1950). GRO index: Births Jun 1884 Brims Donald James St Saviour 1d 57. Marriages Jun 1929 Rutherford Kathleen E. H. and Donal J. Brims Marylebone 1a 1411. Deaths Sep 1950 Brims Donald J. 64 Uxbridge 5f 85.) but retained her maiden name. Brims was the resident medical officer of the Croydon General Hospital. Rutherford later stated that she had no children. Brims died in Hillingdon, Middlesex, on 31 July 1950, leaving £35,173. The 1939 Register indicates that she was married, but that he was not, the marriage certificate remains on record, and the Yorkshire Post and Oban Times and Argyllshire Advertiser reported it at the time in 1929. However, the marriage appears to have been forgotten even during her lifetime, since several sources stated long after the event that she was a spinster.

As a child, Rutherford's nephew Eric Kemp was treated by Rutherford, and grew up to be the Bishop of Chichester. In his autobiography, Kemp wrote that she was "shy, but not retiring". She was vegetarian, and Fiona Callow recorded that "in the little time that she had [she] was said to love music, theatre, art and literature".

Rutherford laboured for charity almost to the end of her life. In September 1975 she was photographed by the Ripon Gazette while assisting at an Oxfam garden party at Birstwith, North Yorkshire, having already opened the event as chairman of the Harrogate Committee. She died in Harrogate, leaving £85,709 (equivalent to £665,696.45 in 2025).

== Career ==
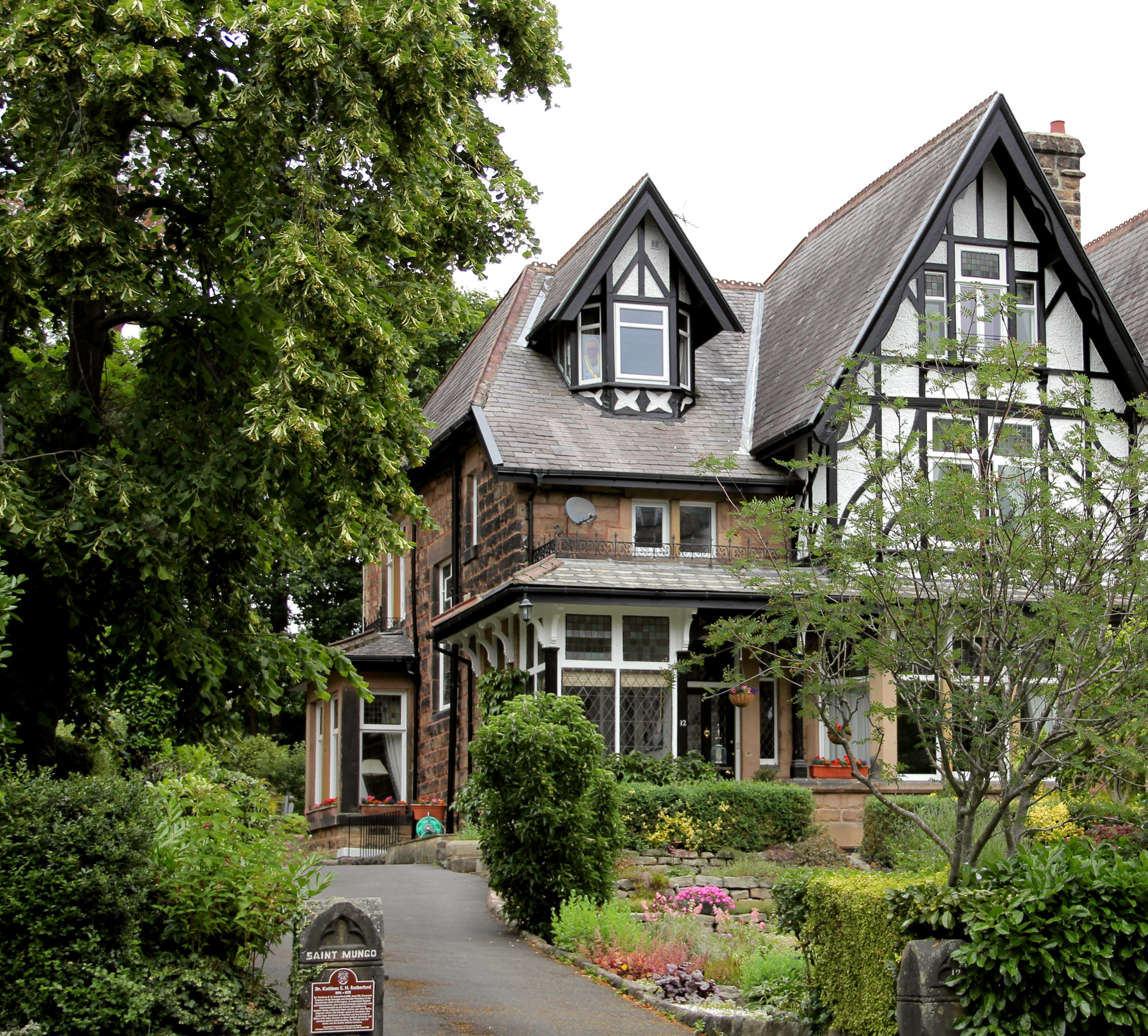
Rutherford's former GP surgery

Journalist Fiona Callow of the Stray Ferret said that, like Dr Laura Veale of Harrogate, she was a "high flyer", a "trailblazer in [her] field" and an "important figure in the local community". Rutherford returned to Scotland in 1914 to train as a medical practitioner at the University of Glasgow, and commenced study at Queen Margaret College, Glasgow, on 21 April 2015. She qualified as MB. ChB in 1920, completing her training at the University of Leeds in 1921.

In 1921, Rutherford was a senior house surgeon at the North Lonsdale Hospital in Barrow-in-Furness, and was still there in 1942. According to Harrogate Soroptimists, she took "various medical posts" before settling in the family GP surgery in Harrogate, alongside her father and two brothers. She was practising at home by 1943. Her family's medical practice was located at her home which was named after St Mungo's charity, at 12 York Road, Harrogate.

According to Harrogate Soroptimists, Rutherford was a "sought-after" general practitioner in Harrogate, West Yorkshire. She was known locally as "Doctor Kathleen", and "Doctor Kindly Heart". Fiona Callow quoted her British Medical Journal obituary which described Rutherford as, "highly intelligent and gifted, but so dedicated that she gave herself and her energy, at times to the point of exhaustion". In the 1970 Calendar TV programme, when asked how she could carry on doing humanitarian work even into old age, she replied: "I'm so fortunate. Imagine having your health at my age – it would be a terrible betrayal if I didn't go on and do something with it".

== Philanthropy, charity and foreign service ==
In 2021, journalist Graham Chalmers said that Rutherford was "at the forefront of women taking on leading roles to improve the lives of the most disadvantaged for nearly 50 years". Rutherford's medical and philanthropic priority was always women and children, although they often received her assistance indirectly. She gave a third of her earnings to charity. In the 1930s she assisted Basque children to flee the Spanish Civil War. In 1963 she donated money to foreign missionaries and convents, including Mario Borrelli's venture among the street urchins of Naples, where in 1966 and in following years she also assisted as a doctor. According to the words of historian Malcolm Neesam on Harrogate's brown plaque, Rutherford "worked tirelessly nationally and internationally to aid women and children in Naples' slums". She established the Harrogate branch of Lepra in 1952, and assisted at the St Francis Leprosarium, in Nyenga, Uganda, in 1967 and 1971. In 1969 under the auspices of War on Want, she went to Biskra, Algeria, with an ophthalmologist and nurse, There, under the Algerian Red Crescent, she was occupied in general medicine and eye clinics for five months. According to the Birmingham Daily Post, in 1970 she travelled on a "mercy mission" to Nigeria, taking with her three medics, "three Land Rovers and five tons of medical supplies". She worked in war-torn Biafra, and in 1971 when she was in failing health, refugee camps in Jerusalem. She helped refugees in Europe also.

In 1972, among doctors all younger than herself, Rutherford attended a conference in China where medical advances and global understanding were shared. This was the first group of doctors from the United Kingdom to be invited there.

According to Malcolm Neesam who wrote Harrogate's brown plaques, Rutherford was a "committed Quaker and humanitarian [who] made large donations to charities". For example, when left £42,000 (equivalent to £783,908.36 in 2025) in 1962 by former patient and family friend William Henry Lazenby, (Note: William Henry Lazenby (Dulwich 1877 – Harrogate January 1962). GRO index: Births Sep 1877 Lazenby William Henry Camberwell 1D 695. Deaths Mar 1962 Lazenby William H. 84 Claro 2c 118.) a Lloyd's underwriter, she received seven hundred appeals and begging letters. Instead, she donated most of it to various charities via a trust fund. She did this because, as she said, "I haven't any children of my own, so it will go to the children who have no fathers and mothers ... I don't need much to live on". However her housekeeper commented, "She devotes about a third of her income to charity. I don't think she realises that one day she will be an old woman and will need it". The charities which benefited from that bequest included leprosy, Save the Children, Guide Dogs for the Blind, War on Want, and famine relief, plus many local causes, including the Harold Styan Boys' Club, and Harrogate School of Art. It also enabled her to travel abroad for humanitarian work. This philanthropy attracted much newspaper publicity from, among others, the Daily Express, The Scotsman, the Halifax Evening Courier, the Newcastle Journal, and the Daily Herald.

== Peace campaigner ==
Rutherford was a lifelong pacifist, and in the years leading up to, and during, the Second World War, she campaigned for peace. In that context, in 1935 she wrote to Adolf Hitler requesting that Soroptimists from Germany be permitted to attend a conference in Harrogate. In due course, and before the war began, she received an invitation, "from Hitler himself", to attend a Nuremberg rally, and she did so. At the time, she did not expect the war to happen, and believed that it was avoidable. She said in the 1970 Calendar TV programme (described below) that, "it didn't frighten me half as much as it does now – I maybe had more faith in humanity than I do now". She gave a speech at a Women's Peace Campaign meeting called "Is war the only way?" in 1940. After the war, she campaigned for donations of equipment, medical supplies, clothing, and food to be sent to war-torn Europe.

== Awards ==
In 1970 Rutherford was appointed a Member of the Most Excellent Order of the British Empire (MBE) for "services to medical work in underdeveloped countries". in 1973 she was made an honorary Freeman of the Borough of Harrogate. She was one of the last to receive that honour from the borough.

== Associations ==
=== Yorkshire Association of Medical Women ===
In 1935, Rutherford was president of the Yorkshire Association of Medical Women, and held its annual dinner for a hundred members and guests at the Grand Hotel, Harrogate. The former Grand Hotel, built by David Simpson and later known as Windsor House, still stands opposite Rutherford's former surgery.

=== Soroptimists ===
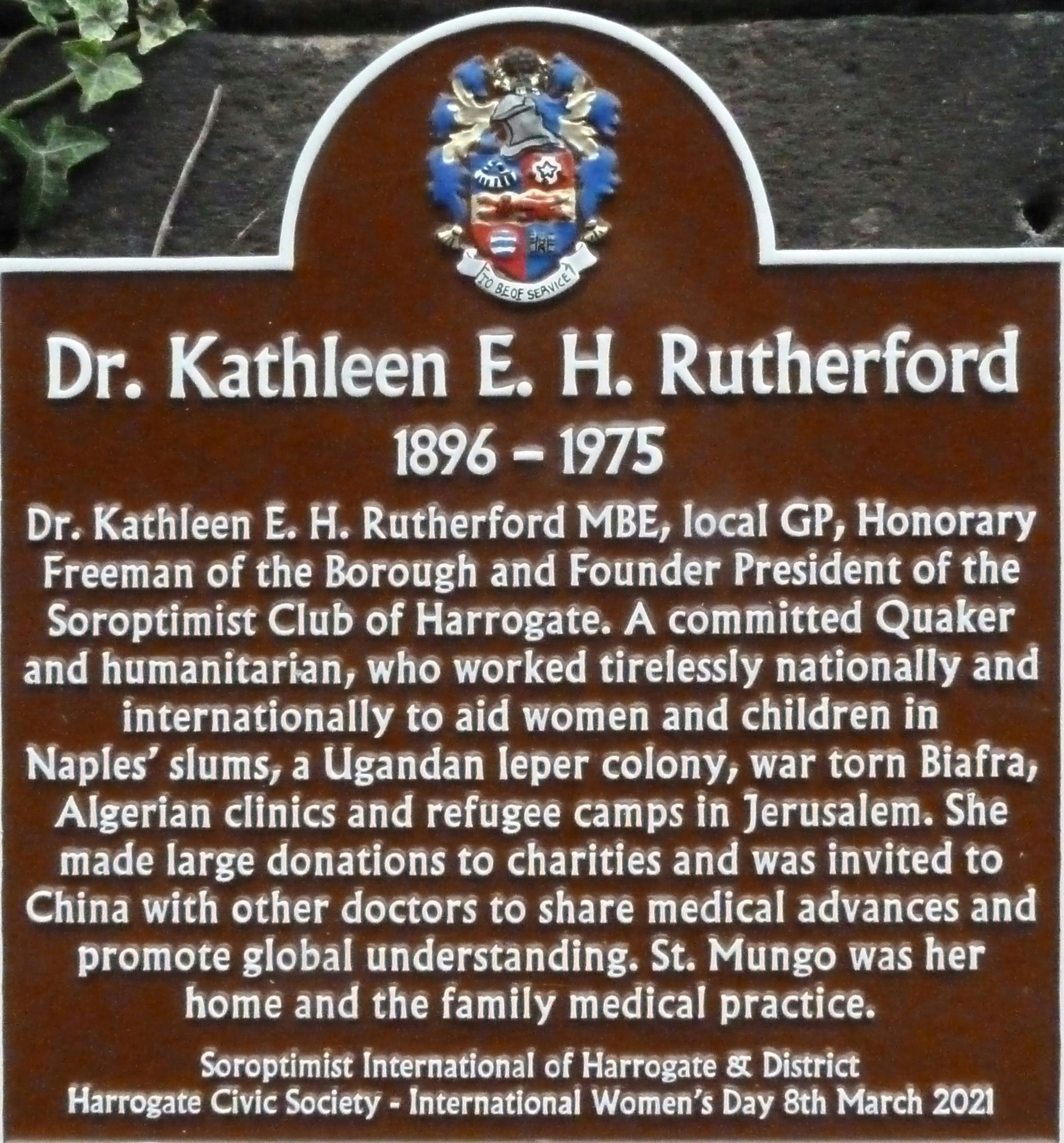
Rutherford's brown plaque

From 1933 to 1936 Rutherford was the founder president of the Soroptimist Club of Harrogate. In 1937 she was elected president of the North Eastern Divisional Union of Soroptimists International, and served on its Federation Governing Board. In 1938 she was elected vice-president of Soroptimist International of Great Britain and Ireland (SIGBI). On International Women's Day on 8 March 2021, Harrogate Civic Society and Soroptimist International of Harrogate erected a brown plaque in honour of Rutherford, on the gatepost of her former surgery at 12 York Road, Harrogate. This was done because, according to Harrogate Soroptimists, "She was an impenitent idealist, internationalist, committed Quaker striving to make a difference through raising awareness, advocacy and action". Rutherford was one of the hundred Soroptimists whose biographies were included in the #Whoisshe Campaign, a campaign designed to recognise female achievers.

== Legacy ==
In October 1970, Yorkshire Television transmitted a thirty-minute Calendar programme featuring Rutherford talking about her life, and her "exploits across the globe, from the 1930s to the 1970s". The programme describes her as being, "recognised as being a legend in her own lifetime". It was shown again to an audience of Yorkshire Soroptimists at an International Women's Day event in Harrogate in 2020. The Stage said:

This compelling and at times very moving programme is largely a conversation piece between [presenter] Michael Partington and Dr Kathleen Rutherford. At seventy she divides her time between spa medicine in her home town of Harrogate with working visits to the trouble spots of the world. Produced by Partington and directed by Ronnie Mutch it is worthy of the widest showing on moral and humanitarian grounds alone.

Around 1970, a plaster Head of Kathleen Rutherford, with bronze-effect finish, was sculpted by artist Kenneth Pigott. (Note: Kenneth Pigott, artist (Eccleshall 5 September 1922 – Harrogate 1977). GRO index: Births Dec 1922 Pigott Kenneth Dyson Ecclesall B. 9c 693. Deaths Jun 1977 Pigott Kenneth 05SE1922 Claro 2 1960.)

== See also ==
- List of peace activists
