= Emily James =

Emily James may refer to:

- Emily James, character in the British TV series Hotel Babylon
- Emily James, character in the British TV series Waterloo Road

== See also ==
- Emily St. James, American journalist and writer
- Emily James Smith Putnam (1862–1944), American classical scholar
- Emily Janes (1846–1928), British women's rights activist
