= Mario Borrelli bibliography =

Mario Borrelli (19 September 1922 – 13 February 2007) was a Neapolitan priest, sociologist and educationist.

Mario Borrelli received the attention of press and television for decades, overseas more than in Italy, his own country. The popularity of his social undertakings is demonstrated by hundreds of publications presently in the phase of being catalogued. Mario Borrelli fits with the definition of organic intellectual according to Gramsci's terminology: his historical and social studies mark the most significant stages of his life but especially his work in society. Editor and Director of Lo Scugnizzo, media outlet of La Casa dello Scugnizzo (The House of the Urchins), he harboured multiple interests other than that for the social sciences. He was author of autobiographies, poems, scripts and educational projects until the 1980s when he principally narrowed down his interests to peace research and education. His works still remain partly unpublished. The documents and articles indicated below can only partly be found in Italian and foreign libraries, while the entire collection of publications is stored in his private archive of the Borrelli-West family, which continues to spend time and dedication to the catalogueing of Mario Borrelli's main biographies and especially of his rich historical and critical production. It should be stressed that the list of documents and publications indicated below, although representative of Mario Borrelli's works, is by no means complete.

== Autobiographies ==
Mario Borrelli was already popular in Anglophile countries since the 1950s thanks to the biographical novel Children of the Sun written by Morris West, in which his undertakings as priest-street urchin had been celebrated as an example of heroism and Christianity. When, in 1963, he wrote together with A. Thorne his first autobiography, A Street Lamp and the Stars, it was with the aim to share with his trustees, around the world, both the story behind the foundation of the Casa dello Scugnizzo (House of the Urchins) and the spirit with which he continued to welcome and raise so many maladapted children. In 1967, Un Prete nelle Baracche, was inspired by the diary he had kept between 1962 and 1963, the first years he had spent in the slums of Naples, where the street urchins most commonly came from.

=== Books ===
- Mario Borrelli and Anthony Thorne, A street lamp and the stars, London, Peter Davies, 1963 (Italian translation: Mario Borrelli and Anthony Thorne, Napoli d'oro e di stracci, Rome, Borla Editore, 1965.)
- Mario Borrelli, Un prete nelle baracche, Vicenza, La Locusta, 1967.
- Mario Borrelli, The continuing story from Morris West, Children of the sun, Fontana Books Ltd., 1983.
- Mario Borrelli, Marciapiedi, Molfetta, Edizioni La Meridiana, 1995.

== Historical-archival research ==
Archivist paleographer in education and researcher at the Archive of the Padri Girolamini Library in Naples, Mario Borrelli produced several bibliographic works. From 1961, he published essays and articles of social and humanitary relevance such as L’Archivio del Conservatorio dei Poveri di Gesù Cristo (details below). The volumes dedicated to the Cardinal Cesare Baronio and to the Neapolitan Oratory gave a significant contribution to the Neapolitan studies of the 15th century.

=== Books ===
- Mario Borrelli, L’Archivio del Conservatorio dei Poveri di Gesù Cristo, in A. Caserta, Archivi Ecclesiastici di Napoli, Naples, Tip. D’Agostino, pp. 65–69, 1961.
- Mario Borrelli, La concezione Copernico-Galileiana e la Filosofia di Tommaso D’Aquino, Naples, 1961.
- Mario Borrelli, Le Relazioni tra il Conservatorio dei Poveri di Gesù Cristo e l’Oratorio di Napoli, Naples, Tip. D’Agostino, 1961.
- Mario Borrelli, Compositori nelle opere dello Zarlino, Naples, 1962.
- Mario Borrelli, Il largo dei Girolamini, Naples, Tip. D’Agostino, 1962.
- Mario Borrelli, Le malattie ed i medicinali dei figlioli del Conservatorio dei Poveri di Gesù Cristo, Naples, Tip. D’Agostino, 1962.
- Mario Borrelli, Un’interessante raccolta di libretti a stampa di oratori della fine del Seicento presso la Biblioteca dell’Oratorio di Londra, Naples, Tip. D’Agostino, 1962.
- Mario Borrelli, Memorie Baroniane dell’Oratorio di Napoli, in Cesare Baronio, Sora, isola del Liri, Tip. Pisani, pp. 97–222, 1963.
- Mario Borrelli, Due rari e sconosciuti opuscoli a stampa del Tarugi presso l’Oratoriana di Napoli, Naples, 1964.
- Mario Borrelli, I documenti dell’Oratorio Napoletano, Naples, Tip. D’Agostino, vol I, 1964.
- Mario Borrelli, Opere e Documenti sul Baronio presso la British Museum Library, Naples, Tip. D’Agostino, 1964.
- Mario Borrelli, Documenti sul Baronio presso la Bodleian Library, Naples, Tip. D’Agostino, 1965.
- Mario Borrelli, L’epistolario di Giusto Calvino nei suoi rapporti col Baronio, Naples, 1965.
- Mario Borrelli, Le testimonianze Baroniane dell’Oratorio di Napoli, Tip. Lithorapid, 1965.
- Mario Borrelli, Contributi sulla storia del Collegio Polacco, 4^{a}ed., 1966.
- Mario Borrelli, L’architetto Nencioni Dionisio di Bartolomeo, Naples, Tip. Agar, 1967.
- Mario Borrelli, Contributo alla storia degli artefici maggiori e minori della mole Girolimiana, Naples, Tip. Laurenziana, vol V, 1968.
- Mario Borrelli, Le costituzioni dell’Oratorio Napoletano, Naples, Ed. Congregazione del’Oratorio, Tip. Agar, 1968.
- Mario Borrelli, I fratelli Vosmeer e il Cardinale Baronio, in Soliditas: Scritti in onore di Antonio Guarino, Naples, Ed. Jovene, pp. 3835–3908, 1984.
- Mario Borrelli, Il Cardinale Baronio e l’Officina Plantiniana, in Historians of Early Modern Europe, 18, p. 34, 1984.

=== Publications in magazines and journals ===
- Mario Borrelli, Il P. Matteo Borrelli primo napoletano dell’Oratorio di Napoli, in "Lo Scugnizzo", Naples, 11, 1961, 11, 1, 4, 6
- Mario Borrelli, La processione del Battaglino ed il Conservatorio dei Poveri di Gesù Cristo, in "Lo Scugnizzo", Naples, 11, 1961, 11, 3–4, 9
- Mario Borrelli, Pergolesi fu alunno del Conservatorio dei Poveri di Gesù Cristo, in "Lo Scugnizzo", Naples, 11, 1961, 11, 3, 8
- Mario Borrelli, Gli Atti della Santa Visita e il Conservatorio dei Poveri di Gesù Cristo, in "Lo Scugnizzo", Naples, 11, 1961, 11, 1–3
- Mario Borrelli, Le case romane dell’Oratorio di Napoli, in "Lo Scugnizzo", Naples, 11, 1961, 3, 9
- Mario Borrelli, Documenti della premeva Congregazione, in "Lo Scugnizzo", Naples, 11, 1961, 10, 1–4
- Mario Borrelli, Bartolo Longo, figlio dell’Oratorio di Napoli, in "Lo Scugnizzo", Naples, 11, 1961, 12, 1
- Mario Borrelli, I Lazzari di nome e di fatto dei romori del 48, in "Lo Scugnizzo", Naples, 12, 1961, 5, 3–8
- Mario Borrelli, Convittori e gli alunni del Conservatorio dei Poveri di Gesù Cristo, in "Lo Scugnizzo", Naples, 11, 1962, 12, 2–4
- Mario Borrelli, Gli alunni e i Convittori del Conservatorio dei Poveri di Gesù Cristo, in "Lo Scugnizzo", Naples, 12, 1962, 1, 3–4
- Mario Borrelli, Autografi insigni presso l’Oratorio di Napoli, in "Lo Scugnizzo", Naples, 12, 1962, 1, 3, 4–5
- Mario Borrelli, L’appetito del primo Seicento napoletano, in "Lo Scugnizzo", Naples, 12, 1962, 3, 4–5
- Mario Borrelli, I Vermicellari, in "Lo Scugnizzo", Naples, 12, 1962, 3, 6–7
- Mario Borrelli, Documenti napoletani sulla fondazione del Seminario Polacco in Roma, in “Asprenas”, 9, 1962, 4, 465–478
- Mario Borrelli, Pergolesi fu alunno del Conservatorio dei Poveri di Gesù Cristo, in "Lo Scugnizzo", Naples, 13, 1963, 5, 13
- Mario Borrelli, Napoli, lo scugnizzo e le Quattro Giornate di Napoli, in "Lo Scugnizzo", Naples, 13, 4, 1963, 1
- Mario Borrelli, Documenti sul Baronio presso la Biblioteca Nazionale di Napoli, in “Asprenas”, 10, 1963, 4, 465–474
- Mario Borrelli, Lo strummolo soggetto d’emblematica, in "Lo Scugnizzo", Naples, 13, 1963, 2, 3
- Mario Borrelli, I Padri e i Fratelli Oratoriani a Napoli dal 1586 al 1601, in “L’Oratorio di San Filippo Neri”, Naples, 12, 1965, 9, 14–16
- Aldo Caserta, Mario Borrelli – Le Testimonianze Baroniane dell’Oratorio di Napoli, in “Asprenas”, 12, 1965
- Mario Borrelli, Altri documenti napoletani sul Collegio Polacco in Roma, in “Asprenas”, 13, 1966, 1, 3–15
- Mario Borrelli, Progetto per un piano regolatore di Napoli nel 1861, in "Lo Scugnizzo", Naples, 16, 1966, 2, 1, 3–4
- Mario Borrelli, Ricerche sul Baronio, in “Studi Secenteschi”, Florence, VII, 1966, 69–95
- Mario Borrelli, Ricerche sul Baronio II, in “Studi Secenteschi”, Florence, VIII, 1967, 97–220
- Mario Borrelli, Contributo alla storia degli artefici maggiori e minori della mole Girolimiana, in “Lo Scugnizzo”, Naples, vol I, 1966, 7–32
- Mario Borrelli, Contributo alla storia degli artefici maggiori e minori della mole Girolimiana, in “Lo Scugnizzo”, Naples, vol II-III, 1966–1967, 7–66
- Mario Borrelli, Contributo alla storia degli artefici maggiori e minori della mole Girolimiana, in “Lo Scugnizzo”, Naples, vol IV, 1967, 7–43
- Mario Borrelli, Gli Oratoriani e Giovan Battista Vico in “Valori Umani”, 1968, 8–9
- Mario Borrelli, Una copia Napoletana sconosciuta del Terzo Processo di Beatificazione di S. Filippo Neri in “Campania Sacra”, Naples, M. D’Auria Editore Pontificio, 2, 1971, 137–164

== Works on social administration ==
The works on social administration are the result of the years M. Borrelli spent at the London School of Economics to obtain a Master in Social Administration. From the socio-political analysis of the sub-proletarian reality of Naples (1973) to the basic concepts for a community action on the urban underclass (1974) we find the basic principles, which inspired M. Borrelli in all his activities at the Materdei Community Centre. In addition, between 1969 and 1978, his idea of a participative democracy was a guideline for all his actions of social intervention among the people of the lower classes of the Neapolitan population: the CCM (Materdei Community Centre) worked for the awareness of the underclass taking inspiration from the method of Paulo Freire. Extremely interesting are the essays focused on the relationship between school and capitalistic development in Italy (1972) e Italian compulsory schooling and mental retardation (1978).

=== Grey literature ===
- Mario Borrelli, The role of voluntary groups in Britain, London, 1969. (typescript)
- Mario Borrelli, Unearthing the Roots of the Sub-Culture of the South Italian Sub-Proletariat, London, 1969. (typescript)
- Mario Borrelli, The Society of Southern Italy, in which Naples is situated and the factors giving rise to pressure groups and community development, London, 1970. (typescript)
- Mario Borrelli, Social action groups and community development, London, 1970. (typescript)
- Mario Borrelli, Scuola e sviluppo capitalistico in Italia, in "Social Deprivation and Change in education", Proceedings of the international conference of York April 1972, Nuffield Teacher Enquiry, York University, 1972.
- Mario Borrelli, Socio-Political Analysis of the Sub-Proletarian Reality of Naples of Intervention for the Workers of the Centre, London, 1973. (typescript)
- Mario Borrelli, Concetti di base per un'azione comunitaria nel sottoproletariato urbano, in "Les plus defavorisés, aù nous ménent-ils?", Proceedings of the international conference of The Hague 25–27 October 1974, Federation Europeenne d'aide a toute detresse, 1974.
- Mario Borrelli, Practical Directions for Intervention in a Community Action in Favour of the Urban Sub-Proletariat, 1974.
- Mario Borrelli, Hypothesis of the Existence of a “Peripheral” Europe with consequent different types of Social Policy Intervention, 1975.
- Mario Borrelli, Exclusion from the Productive Process, Social Deviance, and Mental Illness, London, 1975. (typescript)
- Mario Borrelli, Alimentation and Direction of Social Intervention among the Neapolitan Sub-Proletariat, London, 1975. (typescript)
- Mario Borrelli, Communication and Consciousness Raising (a Strategy for the Socio-Economically Marginal and Excluded), in "Europe and Africa: exploitation or development", Vasterhanings Seminar Proceedings, Sweden 1–14 August 1975, by IPRA Summer Seminar, 1975.
- Mario Borrelli, Psychological Problems of Children living under non-optimal Social Conditions, 1975.
- Mario Borrelli, Socio-Political Analysis of the Neapolitan Reality and Programme of Intervention for the Social Operators of the Centre for the year 1975-1976, Naples, 1976. (cip.)
- Mario Borrelli, Nuove tendenze nella divisione internazionale del lavoro e loro effetti sulle condizioni dei lavoratori nei paesi industrializzati e paesi in via di sviluppo, 1977.
- Mario Borrelli, Il Turismo come espressione di subordinazione economica. Rapporto tra emigrazione e turismo di massa (Analisi dell'esperienza italiana), 1977.
- Mario Borrelli, Bisogni umani, diritti umani ed educazione alla pace (Un'analisi attraverso la pratica esperienza del Centro Comunitario Materdei di Napoli), in AA.VV., CCM, Naples, 1978. (in replicate copies)
- Mario Borrelli, Scuola italiana dell'obbligo e ritardo mentale (Un'analisi sugli alunni della età scolare obbligatoria), in "The Child under Stress", Proceedings of the international conference of Montecarlo October 1978, by the British Association of Social Psychiatry, 1978.
- Mario Borrelli, Exploration of the Preliminary Conditions for a Defensive and Economic Strategy for Central Europe Leading to its Balanced Insertion into Mediterranean and African Areas (An Analysis from the Italian Context), 1981.

== Peace research and education ==
In 1977, Mario Borrelli was among the founders of IPRI (Italian Peace Research Institute) and soon afterwards became a member of PEC, Peace Education Commission, within IPRA (International Peace Research Association). His essays on peace education were aimed at finding a paradigm that would consider peace education an autonomous science in the same way as peace research. His most famous essay was Integration Between Peace Research, Peace Education and Peace Action, which was presented at the IPRA General Conference that took place in Oaxtapec, Mexico in 1977, a milestone for many researchers interested in peace education.

=== Books ===
- Mario Borrelli et alt., Se vuoi la pace educa alla pace, Turin, EGA, 1984, ISBN 88-7670-008-0.
- Mario Borrelli, Paradigmi per un'azione sociale non violenta, in G. Tafuri, Maestri italiani contemporanei dell'educazione alla pace, Bari, Edisud, 1987.
- Mario Borrelli, Magnus Haavelsrud, Peace Education within the Arcipelago of Peace Research, Arena Publisher, 1993, ISBN 82-91040-03-6.

=== Grey literature ===
- Mario Borrelli, New Trends in International Division of Labour and their Effect on the Conditions of Workers ln Industrialised and "Third World" Countries, 1977.
- Mario Borrelli, Tourism as an Expression of Economic Subordination. Relationships Betwcen Emigration and Tourism (An Analysis of the Italian Experience), 1977.
- Mario Borrelli, Integration Between Peace Research, Peace Education and Peace Action, Proceedings of the IPRA General Conference, Oaxtapec, Mexico 11–16 December 1977.
- Mario Borrelli, Education for Peace and Community Development, 1977.
- Mario Borrelli, Human needs, Human rights, and Peace Education (An Analysis by means of the Practical Experience of the Materdei Community Centre of Naples), in AA.VV., CCM, Naples, 1978. (in replicate copies)
- Mario Borrelli, Project for a training course in Peace education and community development for socio-cultural animators, in AA.VV., CCM, Naples, 1978.
- Mario Borrelli, Analysis and critique of M. Rocca, in The impact of European Integration of its members: The Italian Experience, 1979.
- Mario Borrelli, Education for Peace and Community Development, 1979. (in replicate copies)
- Mario Borrelli, Exploration of the Preliminary Conditions for a Defensive and Economic Strategy for Central Europe Leading to its Balanced Insertion into Mediterranean and African Areas (An Analysis from the Italian Context), 1981.
- Mario Borrelli, Human rights and a methodology for peace, 1983.
- Mario Borrelli, The Development of the concept of peace education in the IPRA Archipelago, 1983.
- Mario Borrelli, Diversificazione degli approcci intellettuali alla realtà e relativa variazione dei concetti di Violenza, Pace, Educazione alla Pace, 1984.
- Mario Borrelli, Deterrenza, Educazione al Disarmo ed Educazione alla Pace, 1984.
- Mario Borrelli, Preminenza dell'educazione alla pace sull'educazione al disarmo, 1st National Review of the Experiences on Education for Peace and Disarmament, Turin, 26–28 April 1985.
- Le ragioni e il futuro edited by Mario Borrelli and Giovanni Salio, in I movimenti per la pace, vol. I, Turin, EGA, 1986.
- Mario Borrelli, The Context of Peace Education on the Peripheries of Europe in M. Haavelsrud Disarming: discourse on violence and peace, 1993.

== Other works on Mario Borrelli ==
Outside of the body of works by Mario Borrelli is a list of the most important contributions (biographies, essays, magazine articles) written by others on the life and work of Mario Borrelli.

=== Books ===
- Morris West, Children of the Sun, London, Heinemann, 1957.
- Brian Peachment, The Defiant Ones: Dramatic Studies of Modern Social Reformers, Oxford, Religious Education Press, 1969; ISBN 0-08-006441-8, ISBN 978-0-08-006441-3
- Romeo De Maio, Società e vita religiosa nell’età moderna. 1656–1799, Edizioni Scientifiche Italiane, vol. I, (p. 56 note 20, p. 64 note 41, p. 173 note 176, p. 245 note 178, 390, 409), 1971.
- Peter Hargreaves, Mario Borrelli, Salisbury, Alamein Press, 1973.
- Giovanna Tafuri, Maestri italiani contemporanei dell'educazione alla pace, Bari, Edisud, 1987.
- Giuseppe Galasso, Napoli, Bari, Ed. Laterza, pp. 332–343, 393, 1987.
- Nanni Salio, La ricerca per la pace in Italia, in Andrea Licata, Italia, Università per la pace, ISIG (International Institute of Sociology) and Università degli Studi di Trieste, Gorizia, Grafica Goriziana, pp. 23–28, 1994.
- Robin J. Burns & Robert Aspeslagh, Three Decades of Peace Education around the World, An Anthology, Garland Publishing, Inc. New York and London, 1996.
- Catherine Jones Finer, Transnational Fundraising in a Good Cause: A North-South European Example, in AA.VV. Social Policy & Administration, vol. 32, n. 5, Blackwell Publishing, 1998.
- Catherine Jones Finer, Transnational Social Policy, Blackwell Publishing, 1999.
- Romeo De Maio, La parte di Napoli che muore – Religione etica e religione quieta. Abstract from La Chiesa, Cronache napoletane edited by Piero Antonio Toma, Gauss Edizioni, 2002.
- Ermete Ferraro, From Pavement to Piazza: Grassroots of Social Work to Counteract the Globalization of Marginality, in AA.VV. Social Policy & Administration, vol. 37, n. 2, Blackwell Publishing, 2003.

=== Grey literature ===
- Salvatore Vasca, Il dissenso cattolico napoletano: messaggio, diffusione, stampa, linguaggio, Degree Thesis, Facoltà di Lettere e Filosofia, Università degli Studi Federico II di Napoli, 1981.
- Baronio Storico e la Controriforma, Proceedings of the studies international conference, Sora 6–10 ottobre 1979. A cura di Romeo De Maio, Centro Studi Sorani Vincenzo Patriarca, 1982.
- Baronio e l’arte, Proceedings of the studies international conference, Sora 10–13 ottobre 1984, Centro Studi Sorani Vincenzo Patriarca, 1984.
- Donatella Trotta, E nel dopoguerra spuntò Don Vesuvio, Il Mattino, 1985.
- Christopher Williams, Street Children and Education: a comparative study of European and third world approaches, PhD Thesis, School of Education, University of Birmingham, 1990.
- Stefano De Mieri, Girolamo Imparato (1549 CA. - 1607) ed altre questioni del Tardo Cinquecento napoletano, PhD Thesis, Facoltà di Scienze Archeologiche e Storico Artistiche, Università degli Studi Federico II di Napoli, 2005.
- Giovanna Caprio, Bibliografia degli scritti di Mario Borrelli, Degree Thesis, Facoltà di Lettere, Università degli Studi Suor Orsola Benincasa di Napoli, 2006.
