= Casa dello scugnizzo =

Italian non-governmental organisation

Coordinates: 40.855241°N 14.246002°E

Casa dello Scunizzo
- Named after: The street Urchins of Naples
- Founded: 1951
- Founded at: Naples, Italy
- Type: non-governmental organization
- Purpose: social care
- Headquarters: Naples
- Region served: Worldwide
- Website: www.casadelloscugnizzo.it

The Casa dello Scugnizzo (House of the Scugnizzo), is a multifunctional foundation of social assistance in the district of Materdei in Naples.

== History ==
It was founded in 1951 by Father Mario Borrelli in one of the poorest districts of Naples to care for the street children of Naples. During the war, Naples was a major base for American and other allied Navies. At the end of the war, Italy, and Naples in particular, was desperately poor. When the navies sailed to their home waters after the war, many children were left in Naples with no care or social support. Mario Borrelli recognised this issue and set up the Casa dello Scugnizzo to provide a refuge for these children where they could be fed and educated, helping them to achieve fulfilling lives. Borrelli also helped to set up a network of committees throughout Europe and America to provide funding and support.

In 1958, the film The Kiss of the Sun (also known as Il bacio del Sole-Don Vesuvio) was released in cinemas and was distributed throughout Europe, while British television (ITV Television Playhouse) produced a biographical script in episodes entitled "Children of the Sun".

== Social care ==
In addition to child care, the foundation now helps women, the elderly and immigrants thanks to collaboration with other bodies.

== Bibliography ==
- "Il Mattino", 16 November 2000.
