= Charles Swithinbank =

British glaciologist

Charles Winthrop Molesworth Swithinbank, MBE (17 November 1926 – 27 May 2014) was a British glaciologist and expert in the polar regions who has six places in the Antarctic named after him.

== Early life and education ==
He was born in Pegu, British Burma, the son of Bernard Swithinbank of the Indian Civil Service, and educated at Bryanston School. He served for two years with the Royal Navy before going up to Pembroke College, Oxford to read Geography in 1946, graduating DPhil in 1955.

== Career ==
Having developed an interest in glaciology he became a research fellow at the Scott Polar Research Institute in Cambridge, studying the distribution of sea ice and its effect on shipping in the Canadian Arctic, which involved the first hand observation of sea ice conditions from aboard the icebreaker Labrador in the Baffin Island region.

In 1959, he moved to the University of Michigan to take up an appointment as a research associate and lecturer, spending three summers in the Antarctic investigating the glaciers which feed the Ross Ice Shelf in New Zealand’s Ross Dependency. He then returned to Britain to take up a further research appointment at the Scott Polar Research Institute, spending two summers and a winter in the Antarctic as the British representative at the Soviet Novolazarevskaya ice shelf station.

He worked at the Scott Polar Research Institute until 1976, from 1971 as chief glaciologist, and from 1974 as head of the Earth Sciences Division of the British Antarctic Survey. During this period he revisited the Antarctic in the summer of 1967-68 and took part as sea ice specialist in the transit of Canada’s Northwest Passage by the supertanker Manhattan in 1969, and in the return passage to the North Pole by the nuclear submarine Dreadnought in 1971.

In 1976 he joined the British Antarctic Survey in Cambridge. Every other season he spent several months in the Antarctic, primarily directing low level radio echo-sounding flights to measure the thickness of the ice within the British Antarctic Territory.

After his retirement from the Survey in 1986, he joined up with two pilots to locate suitable landing strips in Antarctica to enable flights to be inaugurated for the benefit of mountaineers, skiers and other tourists.

== Personal life ==
He lived for many years in Fulbourn, near Cambridge. In 1960, he married Mary Fellows (née Stewart; born 1922). They had a son and a daughter, and Fellows had a daughter from a previous marriage. Fellows died in 1999; Swithinbank died in 2014.

== Honours and awards ==
Swithinbank was awarded the Polar Medal with Clasp, Antarctic 1950–1952. He was the first recipient of the new Mrs Patrick Ness Award of the Royal Geographical Society in 1954 for his research into Antarctic glaciology.

He received the Anders Retzius medal in silver from the Swedish Society for Anthropology and Geography in 1966, the Patron's Medal from the Royal Geographical Society in 1971, and the Mungo Park Medal from the Royal Scottish Geographical Society in 1990.

In 2013, he was conferred an MBE.

Swithinbank Moraine was named in his honour.

== Books ==
Swithinbank published four books, describing his field work and adventures in Antarctica.

- Vodka on Ice, A Year with the Russians in Antarctica (UK, The Book Guild, 2002). Hardbound, 8vo, ix + 165 pp. ISBN 1857766466
- Foothold on Antarctica, The First International Expedition (1949-1952) through the Eyes of its Youngest Member (UK, The Book Guild, 1999). Hardbound, 8vo, viii + 260 pp. ISBN 1857764064
- Forty Years on Ice, A lifetime of Exploration and Research in the Polar Regions (UK, The Book Guild, 1998). Hardbound, 8vo, x + 228 pp. ISBN 1857762614
- An Alien in Antarctica, Reflections upon Forty Years of Exploration and Research on the Frozen Continent (USA, McDonald & Woodward, 1997). Hardbound, 4to, xviii + 214 pp. ISBN 0939923432
