= Herbert James Baxter =

British judge and politician

His Honour Herbert James Baxter OBE (6 March 1900 – 3 May 1974), was a British judge, Intelligence Officer and Liberal Party politician.

== Background ==
Baxter was born the son of James Baxter. He was educated at Bishop Wordsworth's School, Salisbury and Exeter College, Oxford. In 1931 he married Mary Kathleen Young. The marriage was reported by the Daily Mirror under the headline "Tax Office Romance: Senior Woman Inspector Weds Barrister at Westminster Cathedral".

They had one son and two daughters. He was awarded the OBE and the Order of Orange-Nassau in 1946.

== Professional career ==
Baxter was for two years in the Inland Revenue. He was then a private schoolmaster. He was called to the Bar by the Inner Temple in 1927.

In World War II he entered the UK Security Service MI5. He was a Regional Security Liaison Officer (RSLO) based in Manchester in 1941. By 1943 Major Baxter was in charge of section B1D, the London Reception Centre, at the Royal Victoria Patriotic Building, which questioned civilians arriving in the UK from occupied Europe. He may be the author of the official 'History of the London Reception Centre, 1940-45', certainly there is a note signed by him in the copy in the UK National Archives .

He was a Circuit Judge (formerly County Court Judge), from 1955 to 1973. He was involved in a number of trials that led to media coverage, including:

- A ruling in 1963 against Jeyes Sanitary Components Limited relating to workers with contact dermatitis caused by a lavatory cleaner 'Sanilav'; the company appealed to the court of appeal but the ruling was upheld.
- Comments at a case in 1973 regarding the repossession of squatted houses in Chelsea, where he expressed sympathy for the squatters who were living a house which they had redecorated: 'Judge H J Baxter, granting the possession order, called Mr McCulloch "a very impressive witness" and said that although young people living in the house seemed to be very genuine he was powerless under the law to do anything but grant the council possession.'
- Granting a divorce in May 1971 where the women concerned, Mrs Jeffie Allan, was about to marry an imprisoned member of the New York Mafia, who was due to be released for the marriage the next day. Judge Baxter pointed out that the decree nisi could not be brought into force so quickly "The decree can be made absolute in 14 days and that will be a test of how urgent the matter is. The Mafia extends a long way but not to the English divorce courts". The Mafia man concerned was Joe Gallo, and Jeffie had already been married to him once, in 1960. They divorced for a second time and Gallo was assassinated on April 7, 1972, shortly after marrying another woman.

His ruling in the case of 'Yeoman Credit v Apps' in Bow County Court, which was backed by the Supreme Court on appeal, established that, in a hire purchase agreement, 'the goods hired should be as reasonably fit and suitable for the purpose for which they are expressly hired'.

== Political career ==
Baxter was Liberal candidate for the Dover division of Kent at the 1929 General Election. Dover was a safe Unionist seat that the Liberals had not contested in either the 1923 General Election, the 1924 by-election or the 1924 General Election. Despite this, he managed to poll nearly as many votes as the second placed Labour Party candidate. He was re-selected as prospective Liberal candidate for Dover. Due to the formation of the National Government in September 1931 he did not contest the 1931 General Election, withdrawing on 16 October.

He was Liberal candidate for the safe Unionist Hornsey division of Middlesex at the 1935 General Election. The Unionist was again the comfortable victor and Baxter finished third.

In February 1939 he was approached by Dover Liberal Association to return to be their prospective candidate at the general election expected to occur later that year. However, the election was postponed due to the outbreak of war. He did not stand for parliament again.

=== Electoral record ===
General Election 1929: Dover
Party	Candidate	Votes	%	±%
Unionist	John Astor	17,745	54.7	
Labour	Ernest Lionel McKeag	7,646	23.6	
Liberal	Herbert Baxter	7,056	21.7	n/a
Majority		10,099	31.1	
Turnout				
Unionist hold		Swing		

General Election 1935: Hornsey
Party	Candidate	Votes	%	±%
Conservative	Euan Wallace	30,494	64.9	
Labour	Mari M Power	10,320	21.9	
Liberal	Herbert Baxter	6,206	13.2	n/a
Majority		20,174	43.0	
Turnout		47,020	67.0	
Conservative hold		Swing		

== See also ==
- Kathleen Baxter
