= National Council of Women of Great Britain =

- Formation: 1895
- Formerly called: National Union of Women Workers, National Council of Women of Great Britain & Ireland

The National Council of Women of Great Britain (NCWGB) exists to co-ordinate the voluntary efforts of women across Great Britain. Founded as the National Union of Women Workers, it said that it would "promote sympathy of thought and purpose among the women of Great Britain and Ireland".

== History ==
It was founded in 1895 and affiliated to the International Council of Women (ICW) in 1897.

It changed its name to the National Council of Women of Great Britain & Ireland in 1918. In 1928 it changed its name to the National Council of Women of Great Britain.

It supported the work of the Equal Pay Campaign Committee 1941-1956.

Its early archives are held in the London Metropolitan University: Trades Union Congress Library Collections.

H. Pearl Adam published Women in Council, the history of the National Council of Women of Great Britain, in 1945.

== Notable members ==
=== Presidents ===
1895: Louise Creighton
1897: Mrs Alfred Booth
1899:
1900: Mrs Arthur Lyttelton
1901: Mrs Arthur Lyttelton
1902: Lady Constance Battersea
1903: Mary Clifford
1905: Elizabeth Cadbury
1907: Mrs Edwin Gray
1909:
1910: Lady Laura Ridding
1911: Mrs Alan Bright
1913:
1916: Maria Ogilvie Gordon
1920: Maud Palmer, Countess of Selborne
1921: Frances Balfour
1923: Mrs George Morgan
1925: Henrietta Franklin
1928: Florence Ada Keynes
1931: Lady Trustram Eve
1933: Eva Hartree
1937: Ruth Balfour
1938: A. F. Johnston
1940: E. Wilhelmina Ness
1941: Hon Mrs Home Peel
1943: E. Wilhelmina Ness
1945:
1953: Kathleen Freeman
1955: Mrs Stanley Moffat
1957: Eva Isaacs, Marchioness of Reading
1959: Joan Robins
1962: Norah Dean
1964: Kathleen Baxter
1966: Joan Boulind
1968: Guinevere Tilney
1970:
1972: Margaret Lampard
1974: Kay Fox
1976: Helen Waldsax
1978: Diane Reid
1980: Margaret Wingfield
1984: Mary Mayne
1986: Evelyn Fairfax Martin
1988: Rosalind Preston
1990: Elizabeth Bavidge
1992: Patience Purdy
1994: Jean Clark
1996:
2008: Sheila Eaton
2012: Elsie Leadley
2014: Gwenda Nicholas
2017: Andrena Telford

=== Other members ===
Notable members have included:

- Henrietta Barnett
- Nina Boyle
- Lucy Cavendish
- Emily Janes
- Antonella Kerr, Marchioness of Lothian
- Margaret MacDonald
- Ray Michie, Baroness Michie of Gallanach
- Dorothy Peto
- Guinevere Tilney
- Laura Veale — founder and president of Harrogate branch
- Beatrice Webb
- Florence Mildred White
- Margaret Wintringham
- Charis Frankenberg (on health committee, and member of the Salford branch)
