= Joan Boulind =

Olive Joan Boulind CBE (née Siddall; 24 September 1912 – 29 July 2004) was an academic, fellow and tutor at Hughes Hall, Cambridge. She was appointed a CBE in 1975. She was married to Henry Frederick Boulind (1906–1970) and mother of Richard Henry Boulind (1938–1987), Gillian Joan Boulind (1941–1973) and Peter Rodney Boulind (1943–); 4 members of the family are buried together in the Parish of the Ascension Burial Ground in Cambridge.

Non-profit organization positions
Preceded by Kathleen Baxter	President of the National Council of Women of Great Britain; 1966–1968	Succeeded by Guinevere Tilney
