= Ness Award =

The Ness Award is an annual award of the Royal Geographical Society to travellers, particularly those who have successfully popularised Geography and the wider understanding of our world and its environments. It was established in 1953 and named after Mrs. Patrick Ness (1881–1962), an intrepid and well-to-do traveller throughout Africa and the first female Fellow of the Society.

Mrs. Patrick Ness was born Elizabeth Wilhelmina Miller in Brighton in 1881 and married Patrick Powell Ness in 1903. She accompanied her husband to Kenya before the First World War and then returned alone in 1920, when she made several epic journeys across the African and Asian continents. In 1923 she crossed the Syrian Desert, in 1927 she travelled from Khartoum to Nairobi and on via the Congo to the Cape, the first European woman to travel on Lake Kivu. She later wrote a book of her adventures entitled Ten Thousand Miles in Two Continents

== Recipients ==
Source: RGS

Year	Name	Citation (where known)
1954	Charles W.M. Swithinbank	For research in Antarctic glaciology
1955	Ernest Frederick Roots	For being a Senior Geologist in the Norwegian-British-Swedish Antarctic Expedition of 1949-52
1956	Mr. Robert Dovers	For being in charge of the survey party which completed the first map of Heard Island.
1957	Mr. J. B. Heaney	For being the leader of the Gough Island Scientific Survey, 1956.
1958	Anthony Gerald Bomford	For his work as Chief Surveyor of the South Georgia Survey, 1955-6.
1959	J. Homes Miller; George W. Marsh	(jointly) Commonwealth Trans-Antarctic Expedition
1960	Raymond John Adie	For his many contributions to Antarctic geology.
1961	Robin Hanbury-Tenison	For their very enterprising and adventurous pioneer journey of 6000 miles by jeep across South America, completed in 1959.
1962	Dr. Hal Lister	For his valuable work in glaciological research both in the Arctic and the Antarctic
1963	John Baird Tyson	For Himalayan mapping and survey and for his leadership of expeditions to India and the Himalayas.
1964	Dennis Alexander Ardus	For their explorations in the Halley Bay region of Antarctica.
1965	David Stoddart	For his investigations on coral cays in South and Central America.
1966	Mr E. C. Evans and Mr. J. P. M. Long	For journeys among and studies of the Aborigines and their habitat in west central Australia.
1967	Peter Opie-Smith	For geodetic surveys in the Solomon Islands
1968	Wing-Commander C. R. Alexander	For being the leader of the Joint Services expedition to west central Australia.
1969	Mr. Graham Clarke	For being the commander of SRN6 Hovercraft and for his skill, courage and resource which brought the expedition through to a successful conclusion.
1970	Dr John D Thornes	For his hydrological and geomorphological fieldwork in the Amazonas and Northern Mato Grosso expeditions.
1971	Lieutenant Colonel J D C Peacock	For leading the Northern Peary Land expedition which contributed substantially to our knowledge of a little-known region, especially in geology and mapping.
1972	Major David N Hall	For leading the British Expedition to the Air Mountains, 1970, for Saharan exploration.
1973	Dr D J Moffat	For being a member of the Royal Society/Royal Geographical Society's Brazil Expedition 1967-70.
1974	Colonel J M Adam OBE, OStJ, FRCP; Ian Douglas Hamilton	For contributions to exploration medicine. For zoological investigations in East Africa.
1975	Adrian Thompson	For botanical and other surveys in Guyana.
1976	Squadron Leader Tom Sheppard MBE	For expeditions in the Sahara and contributions to desert navigation.
1977	Lieutenant Colonel Harry R A Streather OBE	For leadership of the British Army/Royal Nepalese Army Mount Everest Expedition, and other mountaineering achievements.
1978	Miss F A Street	For studies of geomorphology in Ethiopia.
1979	Nigel de Northop Winser	For leadership and organization of expeditions
1980	Richard Snailham	For fieldwork and expeditions
1981	Chief Petty Officer S R Williams	For recognition of his leadership of the Joint Services Expedition to the Princess Marie Bay.
1982	Miss Shane Wesley-Smith	For administration, in the field, of expedition projects.
1983	Roger Chapman MBE	For his organization and leadership of expeditions
1984	Andy Eavis	For leadership of speleological exploration
1985	Paul Vander-Molen	For exploration leadership and the introduction of microlite aircraft as an exploration tool.
1986	Dr Caroline Sargeant	For making remarkable studies of Bhutan's forest and flowers, and thus an important contribution to conservation in the Himalayan kingdom.
1987	Miss Nicola Bennett-Jones SRN	For unselfish service in medical support of the RGS projects in Mulu, Kora and Wahiba.
1988	Dr John Matthews	For leadership of glaciological expeditions.
1989	Steve Bowles	For leadership of the 'Projeto Amazonas' expedition and field leadership of the Maraca Rainforest Project.
1990	Dick Willis	For contributions to speleology
1991	Dr Richard Crane	For bicycle expeditions and encouragement of youth exploration.
1992	Mandip Singh Soin	For mountaineering and polar expeditions and encouragement of youth exploration.
1993	Michael Asher	For desert expeditions and work with camels
1994	Alasdair Kennedy	For contributions to youth expeditions
1995	Paul Salaman	For expeditionary fieldwork in Colombia
1996	Major Alastair Rogers	For organisation of research expeditions
1997	John Birdsall	For contributions to travelling and exploration for those with disabilities.
1998	Michael Palin	In recognition of his travels leading to a wider public appreciation of the world
1999	David Grey Rattray	For recognition of widening the popular understanding of Zulu cultures of South Africa.
2000	Nick Danziger	For recognition of raising the public understanding of contemporary social, political and environmental issues through documentary films and photography
2001	Peter Drake	For recognition of encouraging geographical fieldwork by young people through overseas expeditions
2002	Nick Middleton	For recognition of widening the public enthusiasm for Geography through travel writing.
2003	Ray Mears	For contributions to the popularization of Geography
2004	John Hare	For raising public awareness and conservation of endangered wild camels in Mongolia and China
2005	Neil Laughton	For leadership of expeditions and encouraging others to recognise their potential as travellers
2006	John Pilkington	For the popularisation of geography and the wider understanding of our world
2007	Paul Rose	For supporting and promoting the popular understanding of geography
2008	David Wright	For the popularisation of geography among young people
2009	Neil Oliver	For popularising and promoting understanding of the British coastal landscape
2010	Professor Iain Stewart	For popularising geography and earth sciences
2011	Colin Thubron CBE	For popularising geography through travel writing
2012	Simon Reeve	For popularising geography through television travel documentaries and writing
2013	Wade Davis	For popularising geography through writing about places, cultures and history
2014	Nicholas Crane	For popularising geography and the understanding of Britain
2015	Robert Macfarlane	In recognition of his work in communicating 'geography to a wide public by means of writing about nature, landscape and place
2016	Andrea Wulf	For popularising the histories of geography and of scientific botanical exploration via her book The Invention of Nature
2017	Kathleen Jamie	For outstanding creative writing at the confluence of travel, nature and culture
2018	Rory Stewart, MP	For the popularisation of geography through the media
2019	Dervla Murphy	For the popularisation of geography through travel literature
2020	Nancy Campbell	For the popularisation of geography through poetry and non-fiction writing
2021	Isabella Tree	For the popularisation of geography through her writing on biodiversity and the relation between humans and the environment
2022	Lemn Sissay	For his long-standing contributions to popularising geography and promoting insightful understandings of our world.
2023	Alastair Humphreys	For long-standing contributions to promoting a greater understanding of our world and wider public engagement with the outdoors
2024	Colonel Chris Hadfield	For excellence in the practise and promotition of teaching in higher education

== See also ==
- List of geographers
- List of geography awards
- List of prizes named after people
