= Mrs. Patrick Ness =

English traveller

Mrs. Patrick Ness FRGS
- Born: Elizabeth Wilhelmina Miller; 1881; Brighton, Sussex England, United Kingdom of Great Britain and Ireland
- Died: April 22, 1962 (aged 80–81); UK
- Other names: Elizabeth Wilhelmina Ness
- Notable work: Ten thousand miles in two continents
- Spouse: Patrick Powell Ness (m. 1903; died 1914)

Elizabeth Wilhelmina Ness, who wrote as Mrs Patrick Ness or E. Wilhelmina Ness (1881–1962) was an English traveller. She was the first female Fellow of the Royal Geographical Society (RGS), and the first woman to be elected to the RGS Council. In 1953 she endowed an annual award to encourage travel, the Ness Award.

== Life ==
Elizabeth Wilhelmina Miller was the daughter of William Miller of Brighton. In 1903 she married Patrick Powell Ness, son of Patrick Ness of Braco Castle in Perthshire.

In 1913 she was the first woman to ride from Nairobi to Edinburgh.

Ness's husband died suddenly at sea on 19 April 1914, leaving her an independently wealthy widow. In 1920 Ness applied to Arthur Hinks at the RGS, asking for a letter of introduction to help her in her trip to South America. Hinks refused, saying that the RGS "does not give general letters of introduction to a Fellow unless that Fellow is travelling on some mission directly for the Society." However, Hicks wrote to individual RGS Fellows on Ness's behalf, requesting letters of introduction from them. For example, he wrote to Maurice de Bunsen, advising that Bunsen "might have every confidence" in Ness since "she is, at any rate, particularly nice looking".

In 1923 she crossed the Syrian Desert, from Beirut to Damascus and then on to Baghdad, including a stop at the RAF depot at Ramadi, Tehran and the Caspian Sea. In 1927 she travelled from the North to the South of Africa. She went from Khartoum to Nairobi, and then through Entebbe and Southern Uganda to the Belgian Congo. She proceeded to the Rwanda Hills and Urundi to Elisabethville and on to the Cape of Good Hope. Along the way she became the first woman to travel Lake Kivu, with a fleet of fur canoes and 32 paddlers.

In 1929 Ness published an account of her travels, Ten Thousand Miles in Two Continents. In 1930 Ness became the first woman to serve on the Council of the RGS. In 1941, and again from 1943 to 1945, Ness was elected president of the National Council of Women. She also became honorary treasurer of the International Council of Women.

Ness donated significant sums to the RGS for expeditionary work. In 1953 she endowed an annual award to encourage travel, the Ness Award. In 1954 Mount Ness in the Antarctic was named after her, in honour of her financial support for the British Graham Land expedition.

Ness died on Easter Sunday, 1962.

== Works ==
- Ten thousand miles in two continents. London: Methuen, 1929.
- Race Problems in South Africa. A speech read to the N.C.W International Affairs Committee . London: National Council of Women of Great Britain, 1952.
