= Kathleen Baxter =

English women's rights activist (1901–1988)

- Born: (Mary) Kathleen Young; 30 May 1901; Bradford, England
- Died: 25 October 1988 (aged 87); Bromley, England
- Education: St Anne's College, Oxford.
- Occupation: Women's rights activist
- Spouse: Herbert James Baxter (m. 1931)
- Awards: Pro Ecclesia et Pontifice

(Mary) Kathleen Baxter, née Young (30 May 1901 – 25 October 1988), was an English women's rights activist.

== Education and career ==
Born in Bradford, England, to a Roman Catholic family, Kathleen Young was educated at St. Joseph's Catholic College, Bradford, and then gained a PPE degree at Oxford University, Society of Oxford Home Students.

She worked as an inspector of taxes until she was obliged by the marriage bar to resign from the Inland Revenue on getting married. The marriage was reported by the Daily Mirror under the headline "Tax Office Romance: Senior Woman Inspector Weds Barrister at Westminster Cathedral". Her friend Diana Reid stated in her obituary that this forced resignation spurred her desire to end discrimination against women.

During World War II, Baxter worked for a period at the Wool Control at Ben Rhydding Hydro in Ilkley, Yorkshire.

== Women's rights advocacy ==
In 1951, she joined the National Council of Women, rising to become vice-president in 1961–1964 and president in 1964–1966. She led the British delegation to the Teheran Conference of the International Council of Women, and was vice chairman of the European Centre of the International Council of Women. She was legal advisor to the National Council of Women up until her death.

She was largely responsible for the establishment of the Women's Consultative Council in the mid-1960s, of which she was co-chairman. This acted as a voice for Women's organisations towards Government and was later renamed the Women's National Commission.

In 1968, she wrote a paper on women's rights for the first United Nations "International Conference on Human Rights" in Teheran, Iran.

Taking up law later in life, Baxter was called to the bar (Inner Temple) in 1971, although she stopped practice after her husband became seriously ill in 1974.

== Personal life ==
She married the barrister Herbert James Baxter in 1931, and had three children: Rosemary, Barbara and Anthony.

An active Roman Catholic, Baxter was president of the National Board of Catholic Women from 1974 to 1977, and awarded the papal cross Pro Ecclesia et Pontifice in 1978.

Kathleen Baxter died in Bromley in 1988, aged 87.

Non-profit organization positions
Preceded by Norah Dean	President of the National Council of Women of Great Britain; 1964–1966	Succeeded by Joan Boulind
