= Emily Janes =

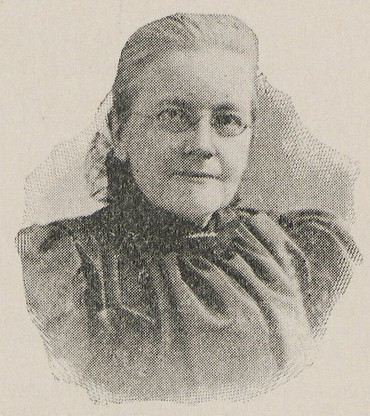
Emily Janes as depicted in Program of 1899 International Congress of Women at which she was a representative.

Emily Janes (14 February 1846 – 26 October 1928) was a British women's rights activist.

Born in Tring in Hertfordshire, Janes was educated at a school in Chesham before undertaking voluntary work, initially managing various clubs associated with the church in Apsley, then later as secretary of the Girls Friendly Society in St Albans and then as the volunteer matron of the Magdalen Hospital in Streatham.

In 1882, Janes met Ellice Hopkins, the two being introduced by Louisa Hubbard, and worked for four years as her private secretary. Hopkins' work focused on reforming legislation regarding girls, and Janes was central to forming the Ladies' Associations for the Care of Friendless Girls, becoming its organising secretary in 1886. She toured the country, giving speeches on its behalf, and also on behalf of the National Vigilance Association. She was motivated in these efforts by a strong religious belief, holding that "right" would ultimately triumph.

Janes also became the founding secretary of the Central Conference Council, a body established in 1891 by Hubbard to co-ordinate local organisations representing women workers. In addition to giving speeches and organising the body, she was editor of its journal, the Threefold Chord. In 1895, it became the core of the new National Union of Women Workers (NUWW), with Janes again as organising secretary.

Janes devoted much of the remainder of her life to the NUWW, although she also found time to edit the Englishwoman's Yearbook and Directory. She retired in 1917 due to poor health, and later moved to Hastings, where she died in 1928.
