= Mario Borrelli =

Italian priest and sociologist (1922–2007)

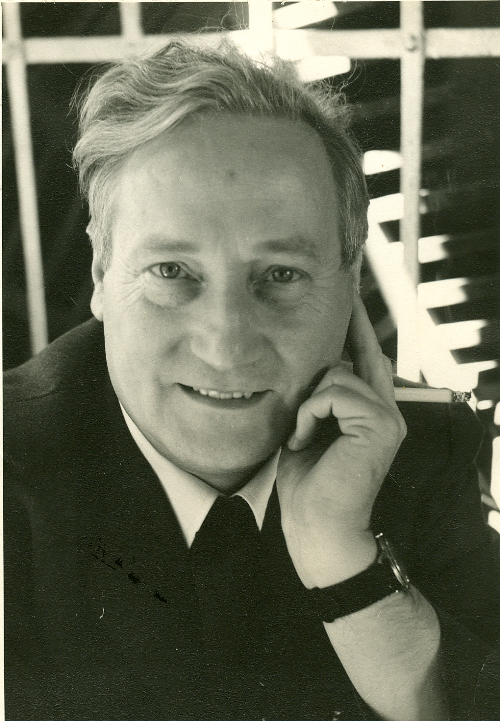
- Mario Borrelli in the mid-1960s
- Born: 19 September 1922; Naples, Italy
- Died: 13 February 2007 (aged 84); Oxford, UK
- Known for: Children of the Sun a Morris West's book; Il bacio del sole - Don Vesuvio a Siro Marcellini's movie; La Casa dello Scugnizzo (The House of Urchins) - Founder; CCM (Materdei Community Centre) - Founder; IPRI - Italian Peace Research Institute - Founder;
- Awards: Stella della bontà (1963); Honorary Member of the Deutscher Kinderschutzbund

Ecclesiastical career
- Church: Roman Catholic Church
- Ordained: 1946
- Laicized: yes

Mario Borrelli (Naples, 19 September 1922 – Oxford, 13 February 2007) was a Neapolitan priest, sociologist and educationist.

In the 1950s he established a home for the street children of Naples which later evolved into an international network for social support, called Casa dello scugnizzo (House of the Urchins). Subsequently, following his laicization, he maintained his international reputation for his civil commitment and his studies on peace research and education.

«The insecure, tormented, down-trodden people, in whom we are submerged, are no different from all the others spread over the rest of the world, even if their eyes, skins, creeds are not the same as ours. Our common destiny is to be the guts of the world, digesting the myths that have sustained empires and manufacturing the vital lymph to sustain the world of tomorrow. Hard work though it may be, we are beginning to digest today's society and church; in time we shall make one another better. Although my white hair and the weight of years make me feel I'll never see the promised land, they have not deprived me of my serenity, enthusiasm or joy in my labours. The urgent thing now is not to get split up, but to close the ranks in support of all who, loyally identifying themselves with the most defenceless, are making their presence felt in the social fabric of our city. They, and all you others scattered everywhere, will be my sweetest consolation when I depart this life.»

Mario Borrelli, The continuing story from Morris West, Children of the sun, Fontana Books Ltd, 1983.

== Life ==
=== Childhood and education ===
Born into a working-class family, Mario Borrelli had to leave school at the age of nine to support his family. For three years he worked as a metal gilder and as a lad in a barber shop. His mother and father were artisan goldsmiths in Naples with five children. He returned to education aged 12 when he was accepted at the Apostolic School, with support of Father Nobilione, a priest who attended the barber shop where he used to work, who paed the school fees for the first year.

In 1946, Mario was consecrated as a priest . He founded the first section of the “Gioventù Operaia” (Young Labourers) and promoted “ONARMO” Opera Nazionale per l'Assistenza Religiosa e Morale degli Operai (National Labour for the Religious and Moral Assistance of Workers), becoming the factory chaplain of several companies.

During these years, he reaches the most remote suburbs of the city with his “flying church”, a second-hand Austin car he had acquired when the Allies departed from Naples. He converted the boot of the car into an altar for Mass and a puppet theatre to teach catechism to the children. In 1949, he was appointed to teach religion at the Jacopo Sannazaro High School of Naples. With his seminary companion, Father Ciccio (Francesco) Spada, he decides to carry out an enterprise among the street children, commonly called in Naples “scugnizzi” (street urchins).

«...how does the street urchin live? The essence of life is the gang. Six, seven, eight and in some cases up to twenty youngsters organized in a gang with a leader. A leader who has been able to impose on its own in perfect style with the wild. The rules of the street can be considered a subchapter of the rules of the wild.»

Mario Borrelli, Marciapiedi, Edizioni La Meridiana, Molfetta, 1995.

=== The venture among the street urchins of Naples ===
The “street urchins” in Naples at the end of World War II were abandoned children because of war or whose fathers had returned to the US or the UK. They had a precarious survival with no homes, regular source of food, no education and no adult figures to provide care and support. The schunizzi were generally reviled because of their thieving and disreputable habits. Father Borrelli realised that the apparent delinquency was driven out of desperate need. He obtained permission by this superiors to dress like a street urchin and, at night, mingled with them, sharing their life and misadventures in the street for four months. In the meantime, Father Ciccio Spada and the other priests of the Comunità Piccola Opera di Materdei organized a provisional dormitory in the small deconsecrated church of San Gennariello, with the hope that Father Mario can convince the street urchins to find shelter there, at least for a night. During one of these nights as a street urchin, Father Mario revealed his true identity to the gang and succeeded in bringing the street urchins to the dormitory of San Gennariello. In a few months, hundreds of youngsters are housed in the structure that will soon to become the Casa dello Scugnizzo (The House of the Urchins), a community more than an orphanage, where nobody is forced to stay unwillingly and where they all participate support community's expenses working as junk dealers.

The Casa dello scugnizzo offered hospitality, boarding, education and moral support to the young and homeless, taking the place of the family. Within a few months with the help of public charities, in a few the boys resumed their schooling and professional training.

«...Mario is an uncommon priest, who becomes a street urchin “like them” by taking off his talar, when the Little Brothers of Charles de Foucauld and their experience of incarnation is still in the future. And Mario is a peculiar priest, who lives “with them” to accompany them towards freedom, when the theology of liberation is yet to be practiced. And all this when the churches of the world, catholic and protestant, at their best operate “for them”. »

Giuliana Martirani, foreword of Marciapiedi, Edizioni La Meridiana, Molfetta, 1995.

The British doctor and humanitarian aid worker Kathleen Rutherford personally assisted and gave donations to this work.

=== The Casa dello scugnizzo ===
Between 1951 and 1969, Casa dello scugnizzo was not only the physical location providing assistance and support to the street urchins but more importantly it was a network of committees and voluntary groups, distributed throughout Europe and The United States and the fund-raising carried out by the community of Italian, English, American, Canadian, Australian, French, German, Belgian, and Dutch voluntary groups. This way of working enhanced Father Borrelli's reputation and his story was featured in the American magazine Reader's Digest, translated in more than 12 languages, spreads his story around the world. In 1957, Children of the Sun, the biographic novel of Father Borrelli's undertakings written by Morris West, increased his popularity in the Anglophile. In 1958, the film Il bacio del sole (aka Il Bacio del Sole-Don Vesuvio), took inspiration from Mario's venture among the street urchins, and was released at the cinema and distributed throughout Europe. The English broadcasting ITV Television Playhouse produced a biographical television series entitled “Children of the sun”.

In the late 1950s a number of children from Casa dello scugnizzo were enabled to spend some time with host families in Germany and the UK to broaden their horizons. A small number of these children returned to their host families in the following years spending several months with them. This initiative drew the attention of the BBC to the work of Father Borelli and he was the subject of a half-hour television programme in the "This is your Life" series broadcast in 1961. During the 1960s, Father Mario comes to the conclusion that the underlying problems, the social causes of abandonment, maladaptation and social exclusion remain yet unresolved. He decides to live in the Neapolitan slums, together with the Little Sisters of Charles de Foucauld, at the core of a network of voluntary groups of Christian origin that look at the Second Vatican Council as a spiritual and civil source and inspiration.

«10 December 1962. If somebody asks me why I am here in the slums, I must honestly reply I don't really know. I could reply: “Because I love you”. If someone from outside addresses me the same question, what do you think I should reply? “Because I love them”. Even this sounds like a sentence that has become rusty by centuries of abandonment. We have become Pharisees and always prefer considering the poor as the sole responsibles of their misery.» Mario Borrelli, Un prete nelle baracche, La Locusta, Vicenza, 1967.

=== The return to the lay state ===
Following a short course in sociology at the TUFT University, he enrolled at the London School of Economics and was awarded a Master in Social Administration in the academic year 1969-'70. He also made the decision to leave priesthood as his personal, moral and political, views are incompatible with those of the Neapolitan Christian church. The conservative position of the local Christian church appeared to him to be in contrast with the Christian mandate. The return to the laity state seemed to be a natural step for him, rather than an afterthought. He remained a member of the Congregation of San Filippo Neri and subsequently married.

«...I have never understood in what way the Kingdom of God could be incarnated in public life as a clan of groups of human interest that would use God as flag and tablecloth for their daily meal. In what way an elected boss, through his patronal-Mafia network, could bring God to the Neapolitans and make them more honest and good examples of Christianity. When I realized that this Church felt the message too metaphorically and remained distant and absent from the poor, I felt cheated in my vocation. I felt as a prisoner, a wheel of a mechanism that tended to save and perpetuate itself instead of saving and helping others.» Mario Borrelli, Tanquam Peripsema, Naples, 1970.

=== The Materdei Community Centre ===
The next step is to reflect the activities of the House of the Urchins in a wider and more communal dimension, "opening" the institute to the outside world by eliminating the boarding and lodging facilities, and by constituting a multi-purpose social structure, which provides different services in response to practical and immediate needs, but at the same time, which functions as “ignition” and stimulus for a community-based participation. Twenty years of historical research leave the pace to social studies, disseminated in international conferences and shared among the collaborators. For ten years, the Materdei Community Centre focuses its activities on the defence of women and children rights, schooling and health, especially during the outbreaks of cholera and “male oscuro” (obscure illness), an infantile disease affecting the respiratory system and particularly common among the children of Naples at the time whose name was derived by its inexplicable nature and difficult diagnosis and treatment. The Community Centre also provides direct social assistance, promotes initiatives in favour of the local community and coordinates the voluntary groups of Naples.

«Until everyone continues to rush, and wants to be first, to gain more at any expense, even by trodding on others in every sense it will be difficult to entrench peace, which consists essentially in the perfect balance between power and resources. What is necessary instead is a work of social reform where the cooperation of others is essential. In the end, humanity is like a wall of bricks: every row needs the other rows to avoid collapsing. Courage is not heroism: it is a moral duty, a social responsibility.»

Mario Borrelli, from the interview released to Donatella Trotta, E nel dopoguerra spuntò Don Vesuvio, Il Mattino, 1985.

=== The Italian Peace Research Institute ===
In 1977, Mario Borrelli, Tonino Drago and Giuliana Martirani founded Italian Peace Research Institute (IPRI), chaired by the same Borrelli until 1988. The institute is affiliated to the International Peace Research Association (IPRA), founded in 1964 by Johan Galtung and which counts with 26 researchers and 250 correspondents distributed in 60 Italian cities. The small institute has the aim to promote initiatives focused on peace research that involve voluntary associations and non-violent peace-inspired movements, a network of people operating in universities and in basic movements for peace. IPRI follows the same path of its international sister institution by promoting research in the field of communal non-violent defence, peace education and non-violent economy and also publishes a bulletin, the IPRI Newsletter. This small institute contributes to some of the major works on peace research published internationally, ranging from economic development to the international division of labour, from the social services for children to peace research and education. Mario Borrelli is also a member of the P.E.C., Peace Education Commission, within the IPRA. Various essays, but especially the experimentation carried out at the Materdei Community Centre, remain as testimony of his experience as a researcher for peace education.

«Naples is a large swamp in which it is difficult to swim. People who really want to work hard, by sowing seeds on a daily basis, become enemies of the city by fighting against the conspiracy of the precarious, or institutionalization of the provisional, and of disgrace on which this city seems to live on. And which has increasingly deteriorated over the last five or six years or so. The earthquake has been devastating: it has broken the harmony, although only apparent, and has given an enormous power to the emerging social class of “organized crime”. The dominant impression is thus that of a “perpetual begging at all levels that ensures survival”. .»

Mario Borrelli, from the interview released to Donatella Trotta, E nel dopoguerra spuntò Don Vesuvio, Il Mattino, 1985.

== Works ==
The list below refers to the most significant works written by Mario Borrelli during the entire length of his activity.

=== Autobiographies ===
- Mario Borrelli e Anthony Thorne, A street lamp and the stars, London, Peter Davies, 1963 (Italian translation: Mario Borrelli e Anthony Thorne, Naples d'oro e di stracci, Rome, Borla Editore, 1965.)
- Mario Borrelli, Un prete nelle baracche, Vicenza, La Locusta, 1967.
- Mario Borrelli, Marciapiedi, Molfetta, Edizioni La Meridiana, 1995.

=== Historical-archival research ===
- Mario Borrelli, La concezione Copernico-Galileiana e la Filosofia di Tommaso D'Aquino, Naples, 1961.
- Mario Borrelli, Compositori nelle opere dello Zarlino, Naples, 1962.
- Mario Borrelli, Il largo dei Girolamini, Naples, Tip. D'Agostino, 1962.
- Mario Borrelli, Le malattie e i medicinali dei figlioli del Conservatorio dei Poveri di Gesù Cristo, Naples, Tip. D'Agostino, 1962.
- Mario Borrelli, Un'interessante raccolta di libretti a stampa di oratori della fine del Seicento presso la Biblioteca dell'Oratorio di London, Naples, Tip. D'Agostino, 1962.
- Mario Borrelli, Memorie Baroniane dell'Oratorio di Napoli, in Cesare Baronio, Sora, isola del Liri, Tip. Pisani, pp. 97–222, 1963.
- Mario Borrelli, Due rari e sconosciuti opuscoli a stampa del Tarugi presso l'Oratoriana di Naples, Naples, 1964.
- Mario Borrelli, I documenti dell'Oratorio Napoletano, Napoli, Tip. D'Agostino, vol I, 1964.
- Mario Borrelli, Opere e Documenti sul Baronio presso la British Museum Library, Napoli, Tip. D'Agostino, 1964.
- Mario Borrelli, L'Epistolario di Giusto Calvino nei suoi rapporti col Baronio, Naples, 1965.
- Mario Borrelli, Le testimonianze Baroniane dell'Oratorio di Napoli, Tip. Lithorapid, 1965.
- Mario Borrelli, Documenti sul Baronio presso la Bodleian Library, Napoli, Tip. D'Agostino, 1965.
- Mario Borrelli, Contributi sulla storia del Collegio Polacco, 4ª ed., 1966.
- Mario Borrelli, L'Architetto Nencioni Dionisio di Bartolomeo, Naples, Tip. Agar, 1967.
- Mario Borrelli, Contributo alla storia degli artefici maggiori e minori della mole Girolimiana, Napoli, Tip. Laurenziana, vol V, 1968.
- Mario Borrelli, Le costituzioni dell'Oratorio Napoletano, Naples, Ed. Congregazione dell'Oratorio, Tip. Agar, 1968.
- Mario Borrelli, I fratelli Vosmeer e il Cardinale Baronio, in Soliditas: Scritti in onore di Antonio Guarino, Naples, Ed. Jovene, pp. 3835–3908, 1984.
- Mario Borrelli, Il Cardinale Baronio e l'Officina Plantiniana, in Historians of Early Modern Europe (Sixteenth century studies conference.; American Society for Reformation Research), Pub: Brigham Young University, Northeast Missouri State University)

=== Works on social administration ===
- Mario Borrelli, The role of voluntary groups in Britain, London, 1969. (typescript)
- Mario Borrelli, Unearthing the Roots of the Sub-Culture of the South Italian Sub-Proletariat, London, 1969. (typescript)
- Mario Borrelli, The Society of Southern Italy, in which Naples is situated and the factors giving rise to pressure groups and community development, London, 1970. (typescript)
- Mario Borrelli, Social action groups and community development, London, 1970. (typescript)
- Mario Borrelli, School and Capitalist Development [Scuola e sviluppo capitalistico in Italia], in "Social Deprivation and Change in education", Proceedings of the international conference, York April 1972, Nuffield Teacher Enquiry, York University, pp. 11-58.
- Mario Borrelli, Socio-Political Analysis of the Sub-Proletarian Reality of Naples of Intervention for the Workers of the Centre, 1973. (typescript)
- Mario Borrelli, Basic Concepts for Community Action in the Urban Sub-Proletariat in "Les plus defavorisés, aù nous ménent-ils?", Proceedings of the international conference of The Hague 25–27 October 1974, Federation Europeenne d'aide a toute detresse, 1974.
- Mario Borrelli, Hypothesis of the Existence of a "Peripheral" Europe with consequent different types of Social Policy Intervention, 1975.
- Mario Borrelli, Exclusion from the Productive Process, Social Deviance and Mental Illness, 1975. (typescript)
- Mario Borrelli, Alimentation and Direction of Social Intervention among the Neapolitan Sub-Proletariat, 1975. (typescript)
- Mario Borrelli, Communication and Consciousness Raising (a Strategy for the Socio-Economically Marginal and Excluded), in "Europe and Africa: exploitation or development", Vasterhanings Seminar Proceedings, Sweden 1–14 August 1975, by IPRA Summer Seminar, 1975.
- Mario Borrelli, Psychological Problemy of Children living under non-optimal Social Conditions, 1975.
- Mario Borrelli, Socio-Political Analysis of the Neapolitan Reality and Programme o Intervention for the Social Operators of the Centre, 1976.
- Mario Borrelli, Tourism as an Expression of Economic Subordination. Relationships between Emigration and Tourism (An Analysis of the Italian Experience), 1977. The Italian version of this unpublised research titled Il Turismo come espressione di subordinazione economica. Rapporto tra emigrazione e turismo di massa (Un'analisi dell'esperienza italiana), edited by Carlo Avilio, has been published by Massa editore, 2026, ISBN 979-12-80181-19-0.
- Mario Borrelli, Italian Compulsory School and Mental Retardation (an Enquiry among Children between 6-14 years), Proceedings of the international conference, Montecarlo October 1978, British Association of Social Psychiatry, 1978.

=== Peace research and education ===
- Mario Borrelli, Integration Between Peace Research, Peace Education and Peace Action, Proceedings of the IPRA General Conference, Oaxtapec, Mexico 11–16 December 1977.
- Mario Borrelli, New Trends in International Division of Labour and their Effect on the Conditions of Workers ln Industrialised and "Third World, 1977.
- Mario Borrelli, Analysis and critique of M. Rocca, in The impact of European Integration of its members: The Italian Experience, 1979.
- Mario Borrelli, Education for Peace and Community Development, 1979. (in replicate copies)
- Mario Borrelli, Exploration of the Preliminary Conditions for a Defensive and Economic Strategy for Central Europe Leading to its Balanced Insertion into Mediterranean and African Areas (An Analysis from the Italian Context), 1981.
- Mario Borrelli, Deterrenza, Educazione al Disarmo ed Educazione alla Pace, 1984.
- Mario Borrelli et alt., Se vuoi la pace educa alla pace, Turin, EGA, 1984, ISBN 88-7670-008-0.
- Mario Borrelli, Preminenza dell'educazione alla pace sull'educazione al disarmo, 1st National Review of the Experiences on Education for Peace and Disarmament, Turin, 26–28 April 1985.
- Mario Borrelli, Paradigmi per un'azione sociale non violenta, in G. Tafuri, Maestri italiani contemporanei dell'educazione alla pace, Bari, Edisud, 1987.
- Mario Borrelli, Magnus Haavelsrud, Peace Education within the Arcipelago of Peace Research, Arena Publisher, 1993, ISBN 82-91040-03-6.

== Other media ==
- I milioni della Lotteria Italia ai poveri di Napoli in La Settimana INCOM n° 582 (1951)
- The innocents, Daily Mirror article by UK columnist Cassandra, (3 December 1957)
- ll bacio del sole, directed Siro Marcellini, with Oskar Fisher, Nino Taranto, Marisa Merlini, Lorella De Luca, produzione CIFA – Munich (1958)
- ITV Television Playhouse, Children of the Sun directed by George More O'Ferrall script by Morris West (1961)
- This is Your Life, BBC TV Programme (1961)
- A Sun Casts a Shadow, IHC International Help for Children (1964)
- Insight, The Urchin directed by Michael J. Kane, written by John Fante, and portrayed by Don Gordon (1964)
- The Urchin Priest, Radharc Films, ITV Archive (1966)
- Line Up, BBC TV Programme (1970)
- Kinder des Schattens, directed by Kay Bondy, BR Media (1972)
- Four Corners of the Marketplace: The Calcutta of Europe in The Philpott File, BBC TV Programme (1974)
- Obiettivo Sud, RAI Talk Show (1979)
- Interview to Mario Borrelli, by Sue Mc Gregor, BBC Radio (1983)
- Mario Borrelli racconta se stesso (Mario Borrelli talks about himself), directed by Moreno Alessi (2005)
- Mario Borrelli, directed by Emanuele Tammaro, Palookaville Ass. Cult. (2015)
