= Stray Ferret =

British online newspaper

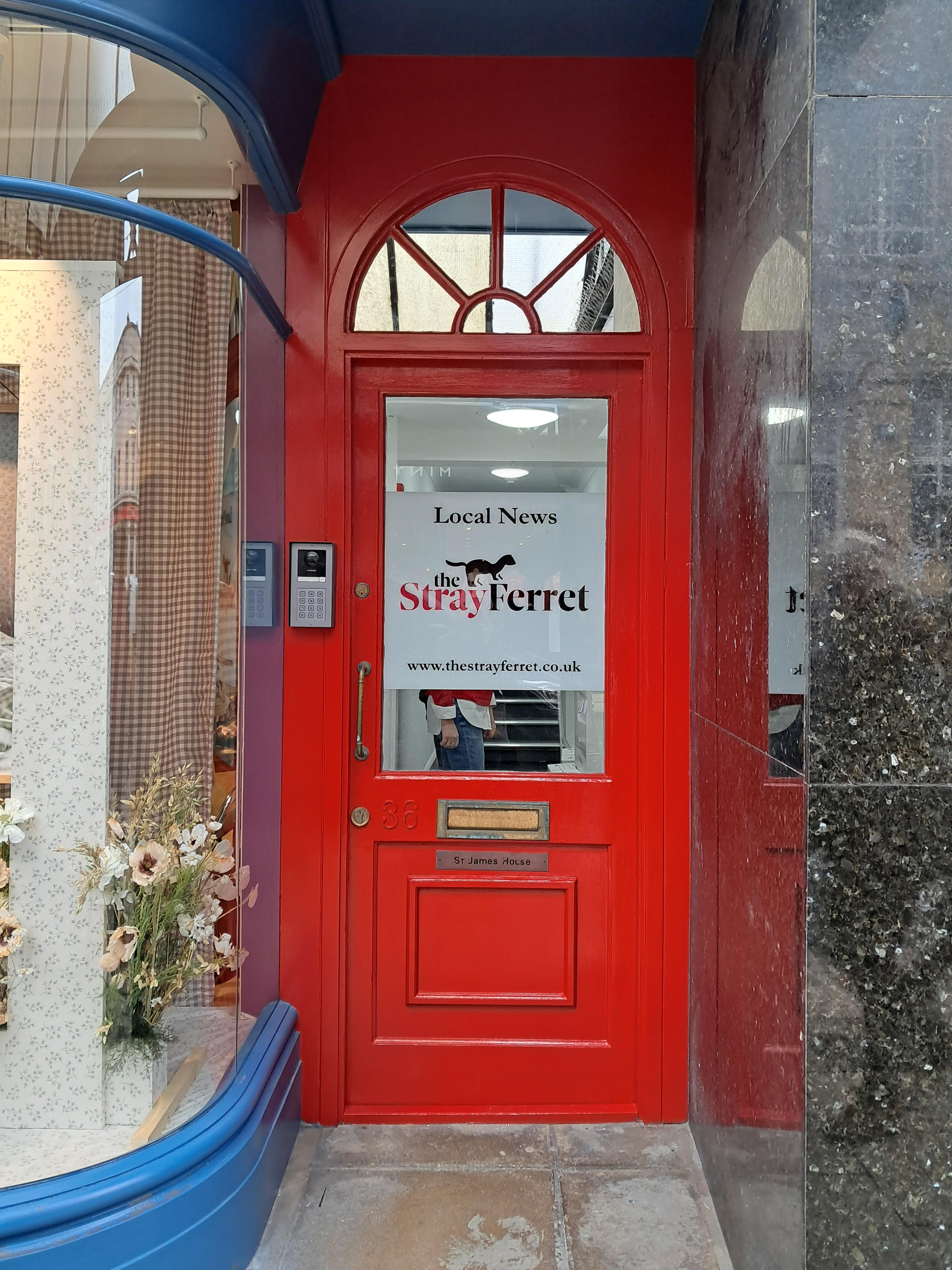
- Stray Ferret entrance on James Street
- Type: Daily newspaper
- Format: Online newspaper
- Founder: Tamsin O'Brien
- Editor-in-chief: John Plummer
- General manager: Tamsin O'Brien
- Founded: 9 January 2020; 6 years ago
- Political alignment: Independent
- Headquarters: St James House, 36b James Street, Harrogate, North Yorkshire
- Country: United Kingdom
- Website: thestrayferret.co.uk
- Free online archives: Subscription

The Stray Ferret, known locally as The Ferret, is a daily online newspaper, serving Harrogate, Ripon, Knaresborough, Boroughbridge, Pateley Bridge and Masham in North Yorkshire, England. It was established in 2020 by Tamsin O'Brien and Chris Bentley, and has a bricks and mortar newsroom in James Street, Harrogate. This news outlet provides local and political information, and investigations of environmental subjects such as river pollution, air pollution and light pollution. In 2024 the newspaper's online platform changed from free access to subscriber access.

== History ==
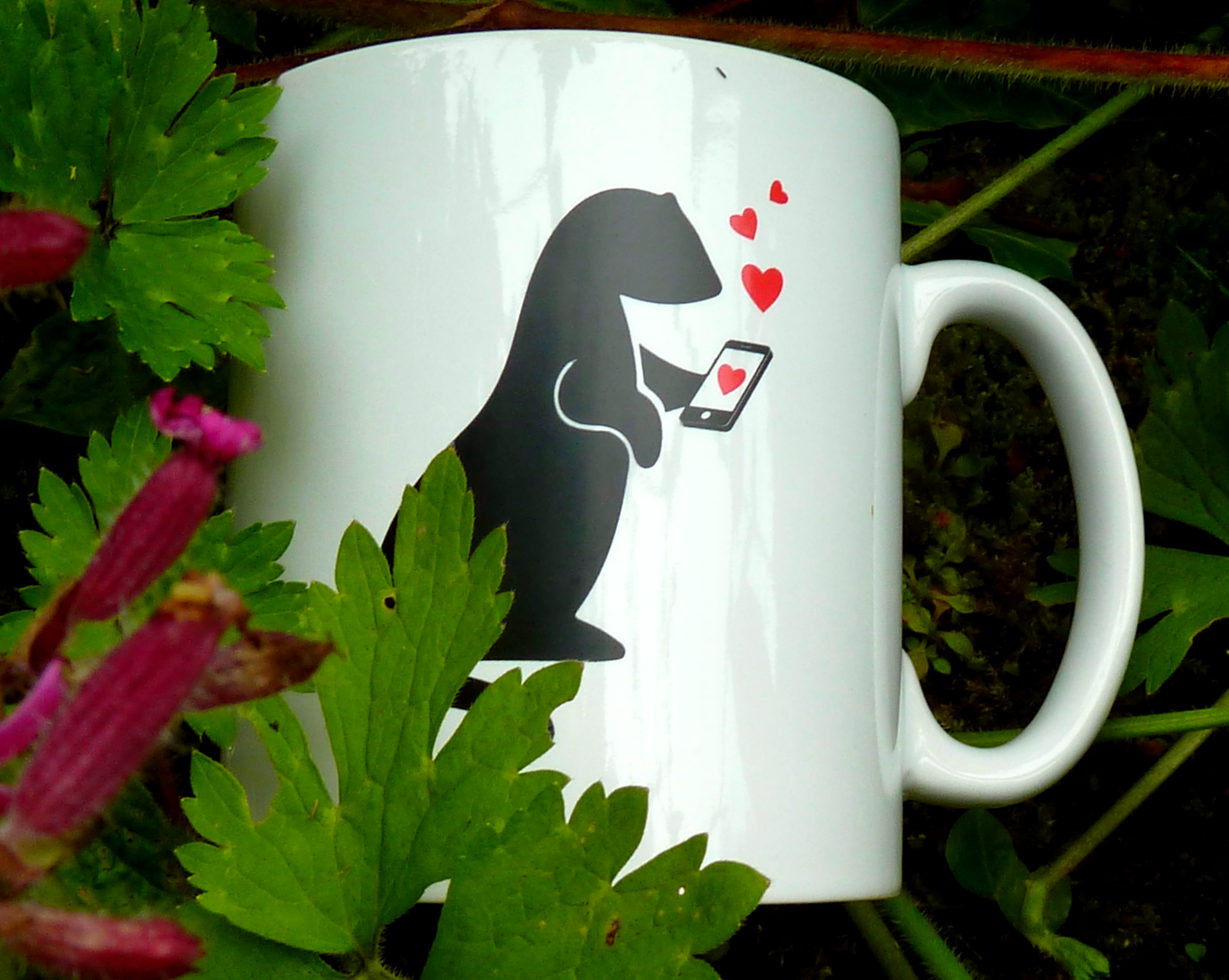
Stray Ferret mug

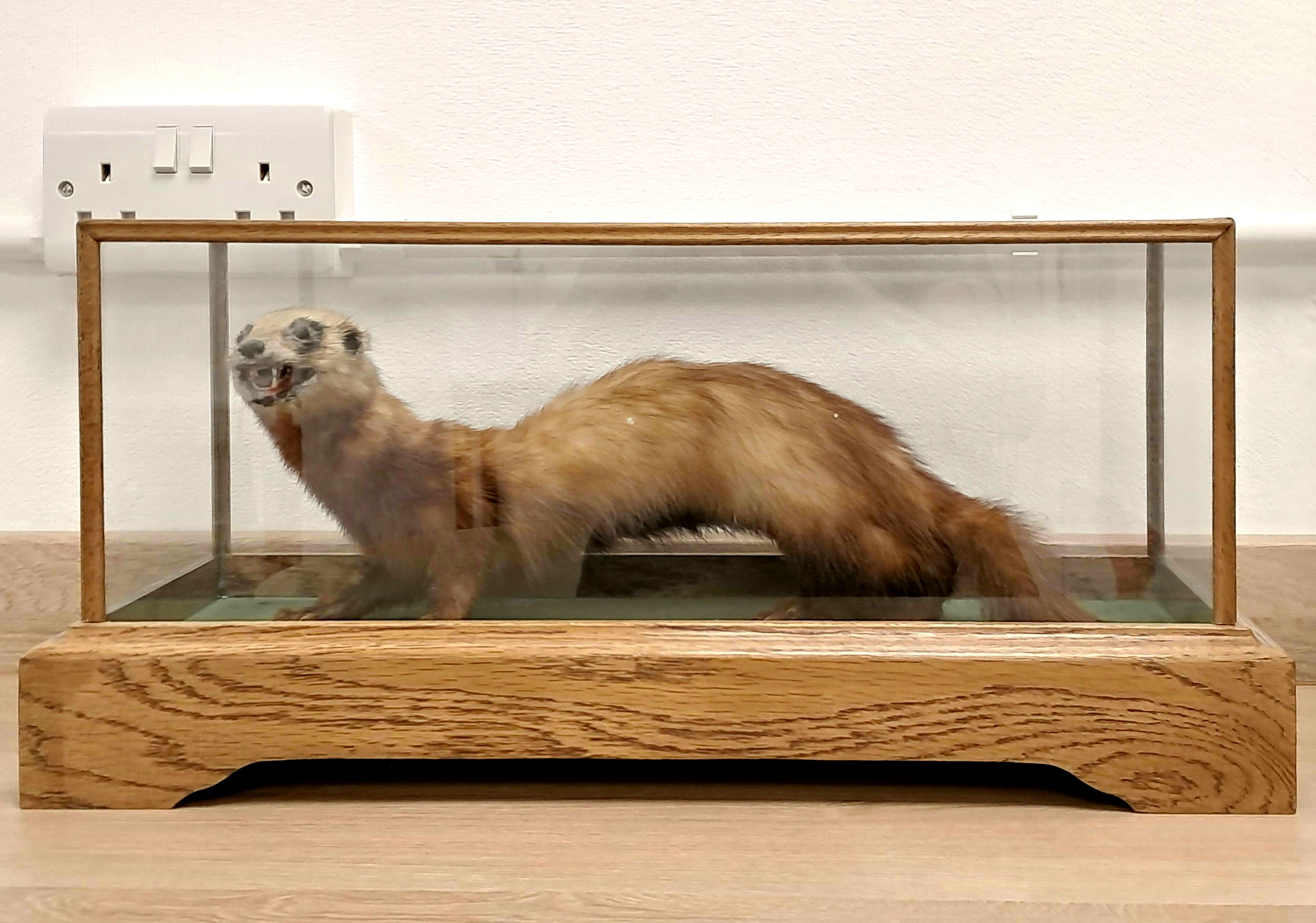
The Ferret's 19th-century mascot

Before the Stray Ferret existed, the remaining major newspaper in Harrogate, North Yorkshire, was the Harrogate Advertiser which had been started by Thomas Hollins as a Conservative newspaper in 1836. That business was bought out in the 1870s by the Liberal newspaperman Robert Ackrill, who then founded Ackrill Newspapers and expanded the business with other local news titles and with much success. The Ackrill dynasty ran it until 1985 when the company was sold, and the company name was finally dissolved in 2020. In 2020, the Harrogate Advertiser was continuing under JPI Media as a weekly newspaper.

Thus there was space for the Stray Ferret to be established as a newspaper publisher at Strayside House, 27 West Park, Harrogate, by Tamsin O'Brien and her partner, Christopher John "Chris" Bentley, the director of Hornbeam Park Developments. The Stray Ferret Ltd was incorporated on 9 January 2020, and the online newspaper was regulated with Impress on 17 March 2020. O'Brien was previously a BBC North West manager in charge of local programmes, and she had been head of BBC Yorkshire. She stated that her ambition was to deal with "a lack of accountability" in Harrogate, and to create employment for journalists. At that time, she recruited a senior reporter and four journalists. The planned content for the news outlet was to be "daily news and investigations". This intention to ferret is possibly reflected in the name of the business, although it was apparently taken from Harrogate's parkland area, The Stray, and the North of England cliché of "flat caps and ferrets". In due course the Harrogate Advertiser found itself relaying some of the news provided by The Ferret.

Sustainability was to be attained by advertising, but by 1 July 2024, the news outlet had begun a transition to subscriber readership.

=== Statement of intent ===
Regarding reportage, O'Brien said in 2020:

We want to look at the efficacy of our public bodies and the work of our local elected representatives at all levels ... [Besides a local high standard of living], there are real issues with housing, drug crime, transport and the provision of health services. We know there are many human impact stories that simply don't get told. The Stray Ferret will be a platform for a broad range of voices to be heard.

=== Editor ===
In his early days John Plummer was a journalist on local newspapers in East Anglia, and then on The Times newspaper and the Third Sector magazine. By September 2020, he was a deputy editor of The Stray Ferret. By September 2021 The Ferret was attaining over 700,000 page views per month. Plummer was appointed editor, leaving O'Brien free to work as managing editor. He is supported by deputy editors and other journalistic staff, including senior journalist John Grainger.

== Location and readership ==
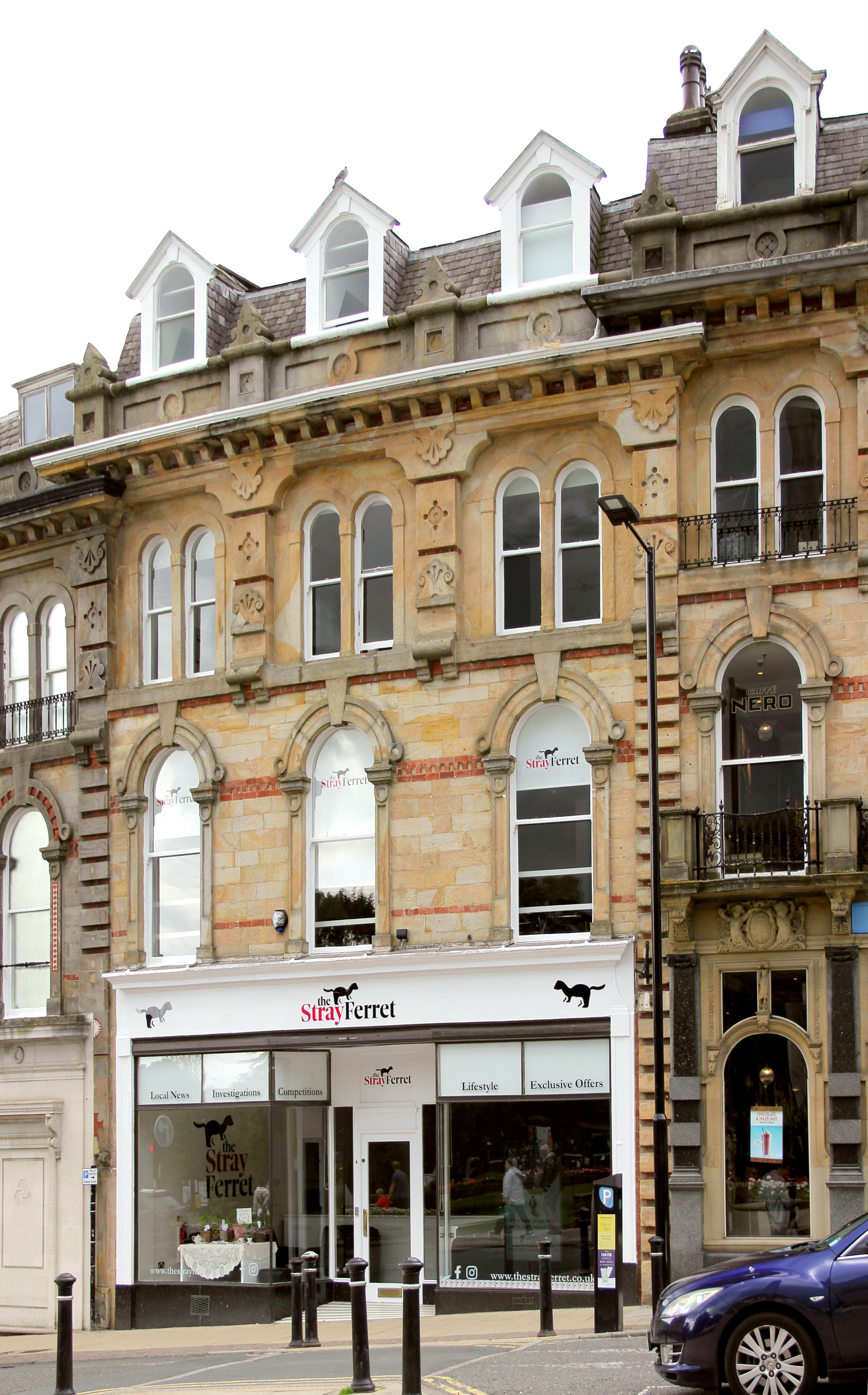
Previous location on Cambridge Crescent

The Stray Ferret company was originally housed on the first floor of Strayside House on West Park, Harrogate, overlooking The Stray. On 22 March 2024, in a move to interface more directly with its readership, The Ferret relocated to a newsroom and shop front at 5 Cambridge Crescent temporarily, for one year. This placed the face of the business in the centre of the town, in a Grade II listed building, built between 1867 and 1873 by George Dawson to a design by John Henry Hirst. On Friday 14 March the newspaper office moved again to a permanent first floor location at St James House, 36b James Street, with an entrance between the two stores, Hotel Chocolat and Piglet in Bed. Tamsin O'Brien said, "We are still in the centre of Harrogate and will continue to be accessible to the public". The news outlet serves Harrogate, Ripon, Knaresborough, Boroughbridge, Pateley Bridge and Masham, all in North Yorkshire.

== Investigation and controversy ==
In 2020, Peter Lilley complained to Impress that there had been an inaccuracy in one of the Stray Ferret's columns on the subject of the funding of Harrogate International Festivals (HIF), However, the complaint was dismissed on the ground that the column was an opinion piece, and not a journalistic piece, therefore accuracy was not an issue in that case.

On 28 June 2024, in an online article, The Ferret reported on allegations that Tom Gordon, the Liberal Democrat candidate then standing for Harrogate and Knaresborough in the 2024 UK general election, had "placed bets on the outcomes of by-elections in 2021 and 2022, using canvassing data not available to the public – and that he won money on more than one occasion as a result". It also reported a claim that "the matter [had] been referred to the Gambling Commission, which [was] currently engaged in a separate high-profile investigation into election betting offences concerning the date of the [then] current election". The Ferret had previously asked Gordon to deny the allegations, but at the time of the report had received no reply.

The Ferret regularly reports on environmental issues, for example pollution of the rivers Ure, Skell, Laver, Nidd, and Oak Beck, light pollution in Nidderdale, and air pollution in Starbeck, and Harrogate.
