= Maud Darwin =

American socialite (1861–1947)

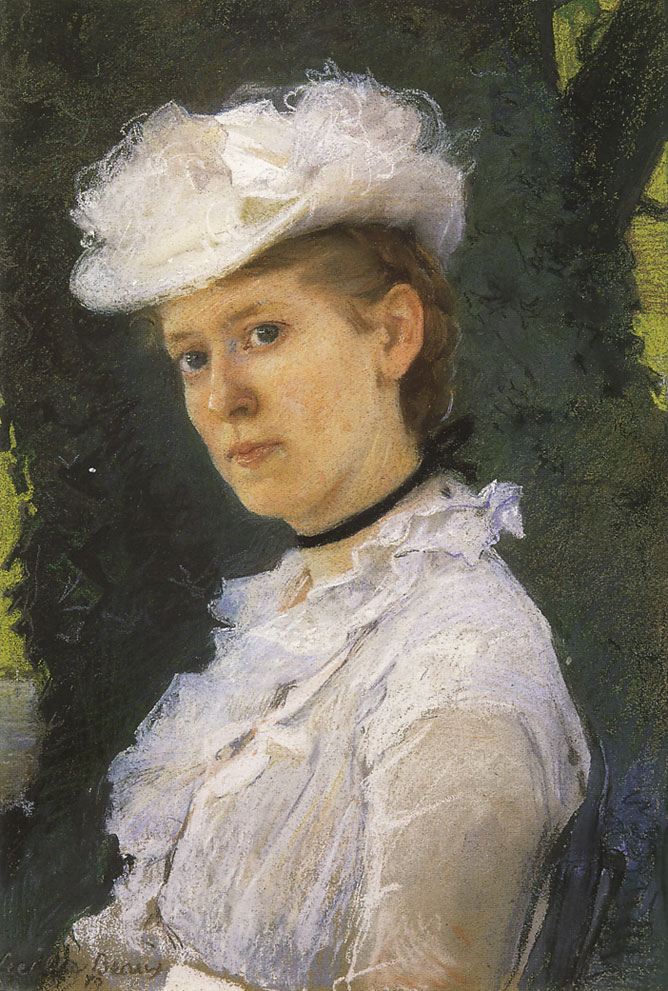
- Lady George Darwin by Cecilia Beaux, pastel 1889. A line drawing of Beaux pastelling this pastel-painting is to be found in her daughter Gwen's book Period Piece.
- Born: July 27, 1861
- Died: February 6, 1947 (aged 85)
- Citizenship: American
- Occupation: socialite
- Known for: Wife of the English Cambridge University astronomer Sir George Darwin.

Martha Haskins, Lady Darwin (née du Puy; July 27, 1861 - 6 February 1947), known as Maud Darwin, was an American socialite and the wife of the English Cambridge University astronomer Sir George Darwin.

== Biographical notes ==
She was born as Martha Haskins du Puy in 1861 in Pennsylvania, the daughter of Charles Meredith du Puy (1823- 1898), author of A Genealogical History of the DuPuy Family and his wife, Ellen Maria Reynolds, daughter of John Reynolds, an English-born clergyman and his wife, Eleanor Evans. Her aunt, Caroline Lane Reynolds, travelled to England and married Richard Claverhouse Jebb. In turn, Maud visited her aunt in Cambridge.

She twice rejected the marriage proposals of Henry Martyn Taylor. However, while travelling in Italy, she met up with George Darwin, son of the naturalist Charles Darwin, who, although a member of her social circle, had commenced his travels independently. They became engaged there.

She married Darwin in 1884 in Erie, Pennsylvania, in an wedding lavishly described by The New York Times. The Jebbs were able to join them.

In 1885, the couple bought Newnham Grange in Cambridge. They had five children:

- Gwen Raverat (1885–1957), the artist.
- Charles Galton Darwin (1887–1962), the physicist.
- Margaret Elizabeth Darwin (1890–1974) who, like her mother, was wife of a Cambridge don, Sir Geoffrey Keynes.
- William Robert Darwin (1894–1970), known as "Billy", a London stockbroker
- Leonard Darwin (born and died in 1899).

In Cambridge, she was elected to the Ladies Dining Society that had been founded by Louise Creighton and Kathleen Lyttleton in 1890. Other members included the economist Mary Paley Marshall, the classicist Margaret Verrall, the Irish suffragist Mary Ward, former Newnham lecturer Ellen Wordsworth Darwin, the mental health campaigner Ida Darwin, Baroness Eliza von Hügel, and her aunt Caroline Jebb (née Reynolds; then Slemmer).

She became Lady Darwin on her husband's knighthood in 1905; and was widowed in 1912. She died at Newnham Grange in 1947 and was given an obituary in The Times, which noted her campaigning for women police officers. She was cremated at Cambridge Crematorium on February 10, 1947; her husband is buried in Trumpington Extension Cemetery in Cambridge with their daughter Gwen (Raverat); also baby son Leonard Darwin.

Her daughter Gwen's childhood memoir Period Piece contains Maud as a central maternal character, illustrated several times. It also describes her role as the wife of an Oxbridge don. Many of her letters were included in her aunt's biography.

Her other daughter, Lady Margaret Keynes, also wrote a book containing many references to Maud, this being principally a book about her home, Newnham Grange and its inhabitants. A chapter in Frances Spalding's biography of Gwen Raverat also contains her life story.
