= Mary Paley Marshall =

English economist (1850–1944)

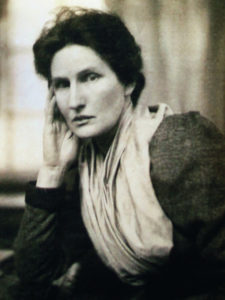
- Born: Mary Paley; 24 October 1850; Ufford, Soke of Peterborough, England
- Died: 19 March 1944 (aged 93); Cambridge, England
- Education: University of Cambridge
- Occupation: Economist
- Employers: University College, Bristol; Oxford University; Marshall Library of Economics
- Known for: One of the first women to study at the University of Cambridge
- Spouse: Alfred Marshall

Mary Marshall (née Paley; 24 October 1850 – 19 March 1944) was an English economist. In 1874, she was one of the first women to take the Tripos examination at Cambridge University – although, as a woman, she was excluded from receiving a degree. She was one of a group of five women who were the first to be admitted to study at Newnham College, the second women's college to be founded at the university.

== Childhood ==
Paley was born in the village of Ufford, near Stamford, Lincolnshire, second daughter of the Reverend Thomas Paley and his wife Judith née Wormald. Her father was Rector of Ufford and a former Fellow of St John's College, Cambridge. She was a great-granddaughter of the theologian and philosopher William Paley.

== Education ==
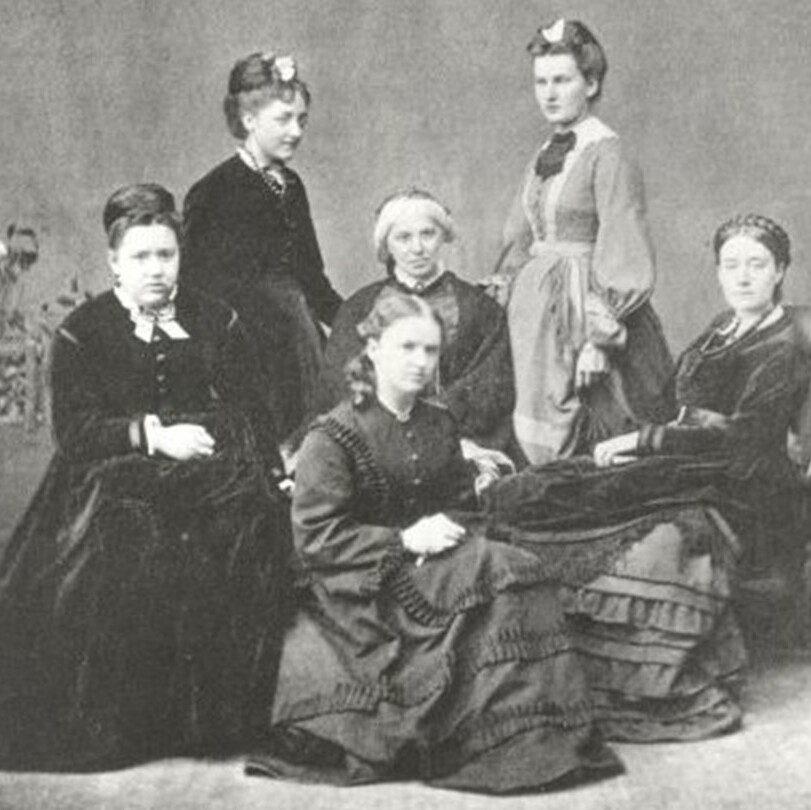
The first five students at Newnham Hall in 1871 with the Principal, Anne Clough (right); Mary Paley Marshall is second right

Paley was educated at home, excelling in languages. In 1871, she won a scholarship to the newly founded Newnham College, Cambridge, becoming one of the first five students accepted to study there. She took the Moral Sciences Tripos in 1874, sitting the examinations along with her peer Amy Bulley in Marion and Benjamin Hall Kennedy's drawing room. Her examiners Alfred Marshall, Henry Sidgwick, John Venn and Sedley Taylor awarded her a pass with honours, though as a woman she was debarred from formally graduating and receiving an official degree. The only evidence she was given of her work was a confidential letter from the examiners.

Women sitting the tripos examination was a milestone for the university, which was to continue resisting formal recognition its own women graduates; a restriction that was later to be supported by her future husband.

== Life ==
In 1875, she was a 25-year-old economics lecturer at Newnham College. Paley had established herself financially as the first woman lecturer at Cambridge University. She was stylish and known for wearing clothes made from the fashionable prints designed by the Pre-Raphaelites.

In 1876, Paley became engaged to Alfred Marshall, who had been her economics tutor, and was at that time a strong supporter of higher education for women. In 1878, they moved to found the teaching of economics at University College, Bristol. Mary was one of the first women lecturers, although her salary was taken from her husband's pay as a professor. In 1883, she followed him to Oxford, before the couple returned to Cambridge, where they built and moved into Balliol Croft on Madingley Road (renamed Marshall House in 1991). Mary lectured on economics, and was asked to develop a book from her Cambridge lectures. Mary and Alfred wrote The Economics of Industry together, published in 1879. Alfred disliked the book, however.

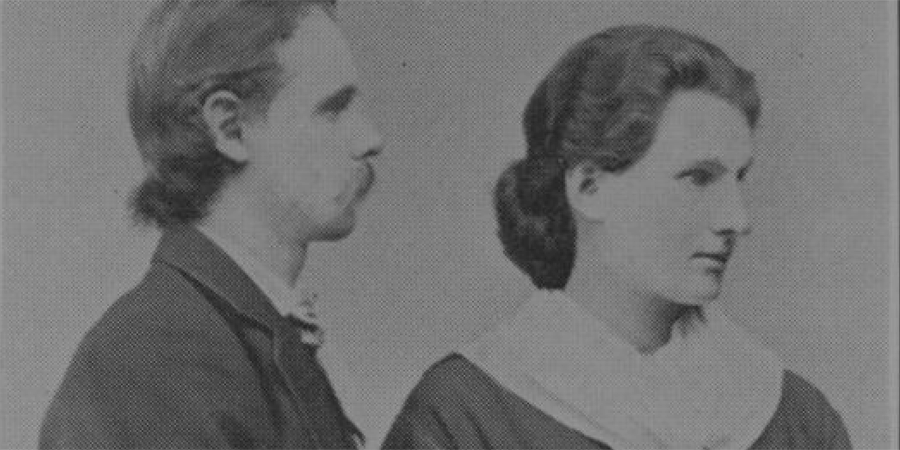
Marshall and Mary Paley in 1877

Alfred had also changed his mind about women students at Cambridge. He became increasingly obstructive to the cause of women's education, believing that women had nothing useful to say. When the university began to consider giving women degrees, he wrote pamphlets and letters objecting to a mixed university, and in 1897 a university regulation was passed preventing women from being awarded a Cambridge degree.

There is no record of Mary publicly disagreeing with her husband's support for the university's discrimination. She taught at Newnham and Girton until 1916. The university did not recognise its own would-be women graduates with a formal degree until more than 30 years after she retired.

Mary was a friend of Newnham's principal Eleanor Sidgwick. In 1890, she became a member of the Ladies Dining Society, several of whose members were associated with Newnham College. The society was started by Louise Creighton and Kathleen Lyttelton; other members included Eleanor Sidgwick, the classicist Margaret Verrall, Newnham lecturers Mary Ward and Ellen Wordsworth Darwin, the mental health campaigner Ida Darwin, Baroness Eliza von Hügel, and the US socialites Caroline Jebb and Maud Darwin. She had close links with women working in charity, encouraging Eglantyne Jebb (Caroline Jebb's niece by marriage) to enter this field as an assistant to her friend Florence Keynes; Eglantyne Jebb went on to found Save the Children.

According to James and Julianne Cicarelli in Distinguished Women Economists, John Maynard Keynes "held her in the highest regard and considered her an intellectual and thinker every bit as significant to the historical development of economics as her husband or any of the other economists about whom he wrote.”

After her husband died in 1924, Mary became Honorary Librarian of the Marshall Library of Economics at Cambridge, to which she donated her husband's collection of articles and books on economics. She worked there as a librarian for twenty years until her doctors ordered her to stop, which she did reluctantly. She continued to live in Balliol Croft until her death on 19 March 1944, at the age of 93. Her ashes were scattered in the garden.

Mary Marshall's reminiscences were published posthumously as What I Remember (1947).
