= Caroline Jebb =

American socialite (1840–1930)

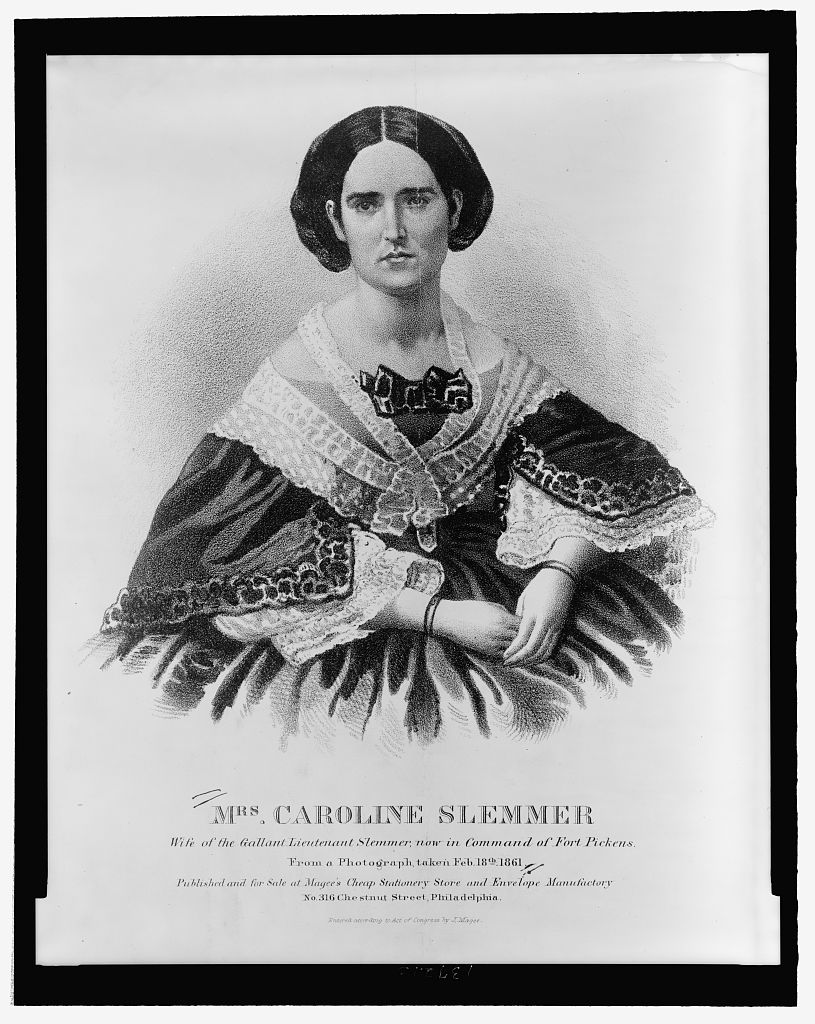
"Mrs. Caroline Slemmer wife of the gallant Lieutenant Slemmer, now in command of Fort Pickens." Lithograph by John L. Magee, from a photograph taken Feb. 18th 1861.

Caroline Lane Jebb, Lady Jebb (1840 – 11 July 1930), née Reynolds, then Slemmer, was an American intellectual and socialite.

== Biographical notes ==
Born Caroline Lane Reynolds in 1840 in Evansburg, Pennsylvania, she was the daughter of the Rev. John Reynolds, an English clergyman who had immigrated to the United States in about 1825. In 1856 she married Lt. Adam J. Slemmer, a Brigadier-General in the Union Army during the American Civil War, and they lived on military bases in South Carolina, Florida, and Wyoming Territory. Their only child, a son, died young. After Slemmer's death in 1868, she moved to Cambridge, England to visit relatives.

In 1874 she married the classicist Richard Claverhouse Jebb. They initially lived in Glasgow, where her husband was a professor, but spent summers in Cambridge until the death of Benjamin Hall Kennedy vacated the Regius Professor of Greek at Cambridge. Her social circle included Robert Browning, Thomas Carlyle, Charles Darwin, Benjamin Disraeli, George Eliot, Charles Hale, Oliver Wendell Holmes, James Russell Lowell, Alfred Lord Tennyson, Ellen Terry, Mark Twain, and William Thackeray. Her niece, Maud du Puy, daughter of her sister Ellen, followed her to England and she took the role of proxy mother, helping to arrange her 1884 marriage to George Darwin, the astronomer son of the naturalist Charles Darwin.

In Cambridge, she was elected to the Ladies Dining Society that had been founded by Louise Creighton and Kathleen Lyttleton in 1890. Other members included the economist Mary Paley Marshall, the classicist Margaret Verrall, the Irish suffragist Mary Ward, former Newnham lecturer Ellen Wordsworth Darwin, the mental health campaigner Ida Darwin, Baroness Eliza von Hügel, and her niece Maud (née du Puy, then Lady Darwin).

She became Lady Jebb after her husband was knighted in 1900; she was widowed for a second time in 1905. In 1907 she published a biography of her second husband, "Life and letters of Sir Richard Claverhouse Jebb, O. M., LITT. D." with a chapter by Arthur Woollgar Verrall.

In 1918, with difficulties in England due to the First World War, she returned to the United States. She died in Erie, Pennsylvania in 1930. Her ashes were subsequently interred in the grave of her late husband in the Parish of the Ascension Burial Ground in Cambridge. She is mentioned extensively, well illustrated and characterised as a matriarch in her grand-niece (Maud's daughter) Gwen Raverat's 1952 book Period Piece as "(Great) Aunt Cara", with her husband "(Great) Uncle Dick".

A biography and selected correspondence were published in 1960 by Mary Reed Bobbitt. Her papers are held by the Five College Consortium.
