= Ladies Dining Society =

Cambridge activist group, founded 1890

Kathleen Lyttelton, founder, c. 1898

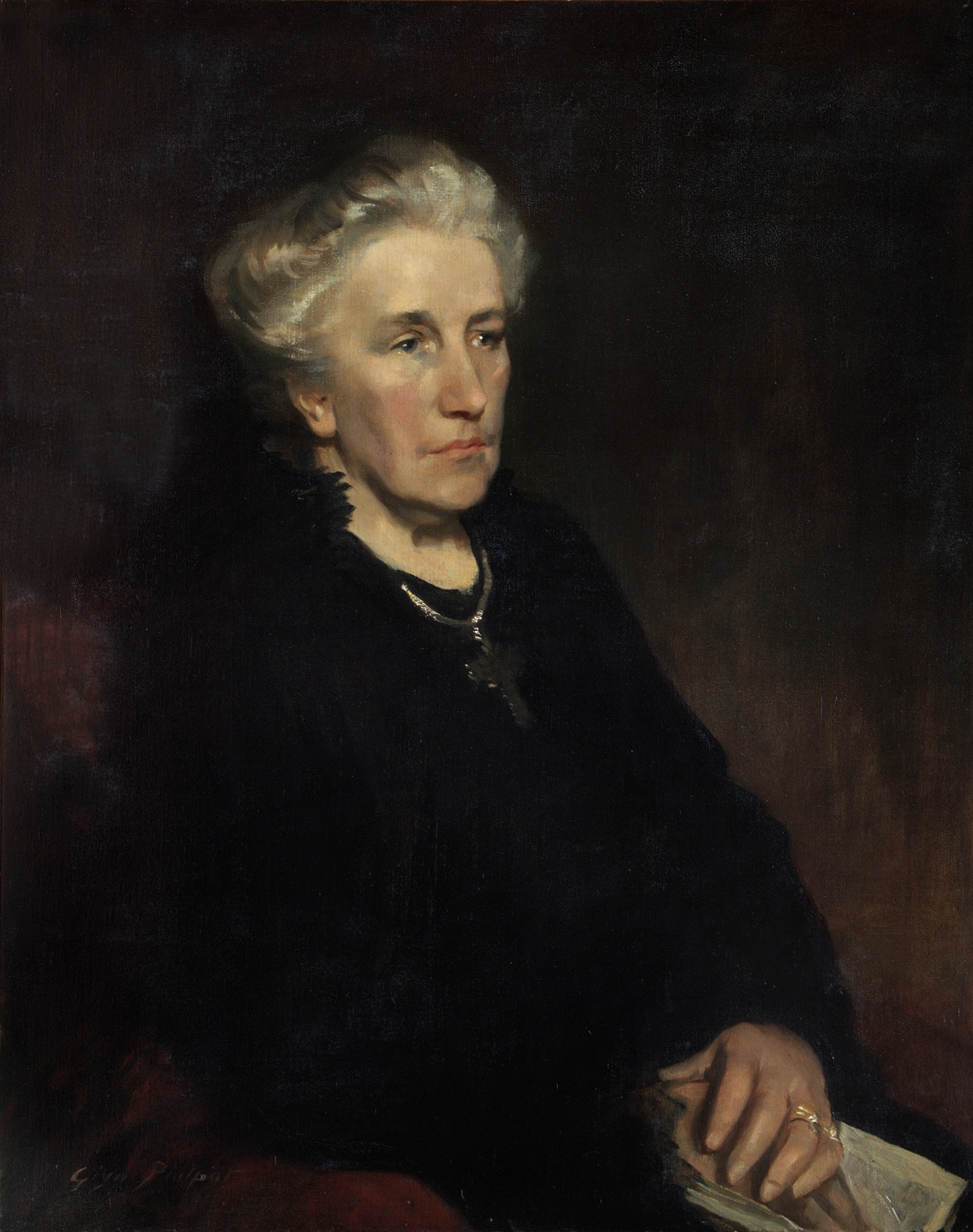
Louise Creighton, founder, in later life

The Ladies Dining Society was a private women's dining and discussion club, based at Cambridge University. It was founded in 1890 by the author Louise Creighton and the women's activist Kathleen Lyttelton. Its members, most of whom were married to Cambridge academics, were believers in women’s education and were active in the campaign to grant women Cambridge degrees. Most were strong supporters of female suffrage.

The society remained active until the First World War. It has been stated that the Society stands "as a testament to friendship and intellectual debate at a time when women’s voices went largely unheard."

== Background ==
Until the late 1870s, almost all college fellows had been prohibited from marrying, with only a few exceptions such as University professors and Heads of Houses. The revision of the university statutes in 1878 ushered in the establishment of the first women's colleges and an era of greater participation of women in university life, although dining in college remained the norm for male fellows with wives being excluded from high tables.

It was against this background that Kathleen Lyttelton suggested to her friend Louise Creighton that they should start a ladies dining club. In 1890, the pair invited a select group of nine (later ten) of their married friends to join their society, "not without an idea of retaliating on the husbands who dined in College." Several of their friends’ husbands were members of an elite society, the Cambridge Apostles, which may have provided inspiration. The society was one of a growing number of women's associations which were formed in Britain during the 1880s and 1890s, and it has been said that at that date "even to form a ladies’ social club was a mild assertion of women’s right to public space".

The society members were believers in women’s education, and were active in the campaign to grant women Cambridge degrees. Most were strong supporters of female suffrage.

The members took it in turn to host once or twice a term, leaving their husbands either to dine at their colleges or to eat a solitary meal in their studies. The hostess not only provided a good dinner (though champagne was not allowed) but also a suitable topic of conversation, if needed. The hostess was also allowed to introduce a guest for dinner. Conversation was to be kept general, Louise Creighton having strong views against what she called 'sub-committees'.

It was an exclusive society, one black ball being enough to exclude a proposed new member. Although the group nominated one of their number to act as secretary, no records of their discussions are known to survive.

== List of members ==
- Louise Creighton (née von Glehn), author
- Kathleen Lyttelton (née Clive), women's activist
- Eleanor Sidgwick (née Balfour), physicist and Principal of Newnham College
- Margaret Verrall (née Merrifield), classicist and lecturer at Newnham
- Ellen Wordsworth Darwin (née Crofts), past lecturer at Newnham
- Mary Ward (née Martin), lecturer at Newnham
- Mary Marshall (née Paley), economist and lecturer at Newnham
- The Hon. Emma Cecilia (Ida) Darwin (née Farrer), mental health campaigner
- Martha Haskins (Maud) Darwin (née DuPuy), American socialite and campaigner for the introduction of women police officers
- Caroline Jebb (née Reynolds; then Slemmer), American socialite
- Mary Frances (Fanny) Prothero (née Butcher)
- Baroness Eliza (Isy) von Hügel (née Froude), promoter of Roman Catholic education.

== Member details ==
Louise Creighton, author and women's activist, was married to Mandell Creighton, Professor in ecclesiastical history. In 1885, she had founded the National Union of Women Workers with Lady Laura Ridding and Emily Janes in order to co-ordinate the voluntary efforts of women across Great Britain. She was its first president.

Kathleen Lyttelton, author and women's activist, was married to Arthur Lyttelton, first master of Selwyn College. In 1884 she had founded The Cambridge Association For Women's Suffrage (CAWS) along with Millicent Fawcett, and had joined the Executive of The Central Society For Women’s Suffrage. She was also active with the Cambridge Women's Refuge, helping to raise funds for what would become the Cambridge Association for the Care of Girls which aimed to provide poor local girls with practical help with domestic economy and literacy.

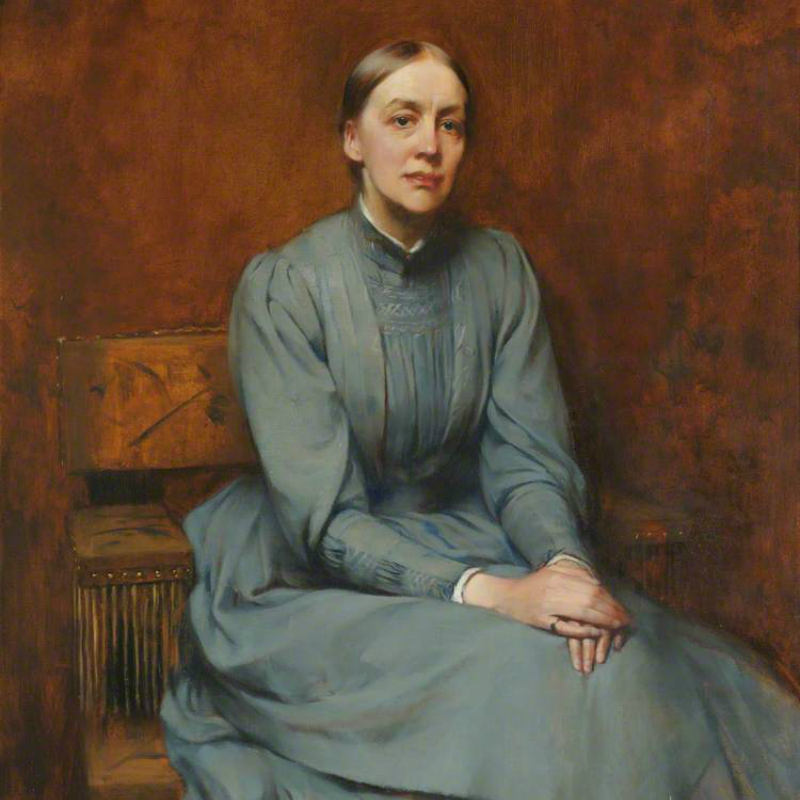
Eleanor Sidgwick in 1889

Eleanor Sidgwick, physicist, psychic researcher and Principal of Newham College, was married to Henry Sidgwick, Knightbridge Professor of Moral Philosophy. She was said to have been a reserved, rather aloof figure but Louise Creighton recalled her shining on these occasions: "I have never anywhere else seen her more alive & interested. She used to quite flush with excitement". Other members had connections with Newnham, too. Margaret Verrall was a classicist and lecturer at the college who, according to a friend "was very easily bored and disliked stale or fruitless controversy".

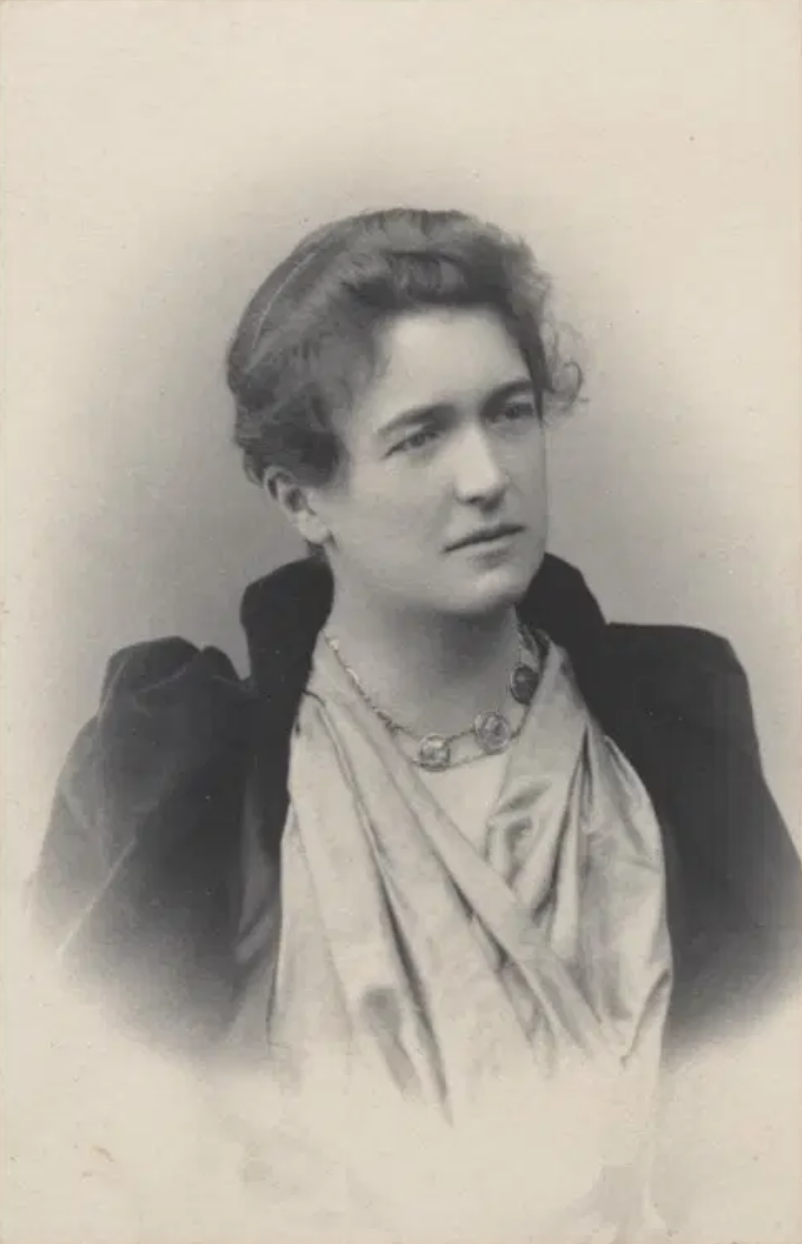
Ellen Wordsworth Darwin in 1903

Ellen Wordsworth Darwin was a cousin of Henry Sidgwick who had taught English literature at Newnham from 1878 until 1883, but had given it up after her marriage to the botanist Francis Darwin and the birth of their daughter Frances. She was strongly agnostic and took her discussions seriously, a friend observing "It was at once distracting and delightfully amusing to hear her say, as she not infrequently did, 'I know I’m right'".

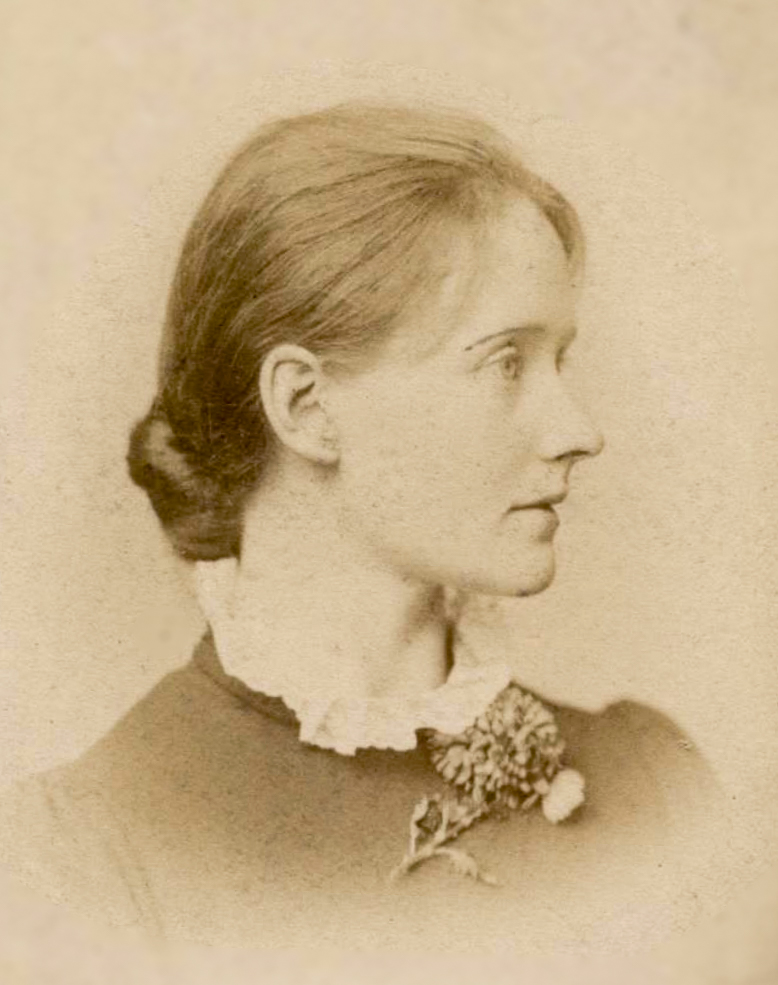
Mary Ward in about 1875

Mary Ward was a lecturer at Newnham and was married to the philosopher James Ward. In 1879 she had been the first woman to be awarded a Class I in the Moral Sciences Tripos. She was a promoter of women’s education at Cambridge and was active in the suffrage movement, her play Man and Woman featuring on suffrage programmes for a number of years. She acted as honorary secretary of the Cambridge Women’s Suffrage Association from 1905 until 1915. It was said of her that her "quick Irish speech bubbled out when she was excited. Life was full of the urge of things to fight for".

Mary Marshall was an economics lecturer at Newnham College and was married to Alfred Marshall, professor of political economy. Writing to Benjamin Jowett, Master of Balliol College, Oxford she reported "The 'Eleven' dined on Tuesday at Mrs George Darwin's. The Eleven are, you know, eleven ladies who leave their husbands behind, and dress well & dine well for their own satisfaction, & claim they talk well too, though perhaps some people wd not admit it".

Ida Darwin was married to Horace Darwin, the Cambridge scientific instrument maker and son of Charles Darwin. She campaigned for the passing of the Mental Deficiency Act 1913, was one of the founders of the Cambridge Association for the Care of the Feeble-Minded in 1908, and became actively involved in helping Cambridge’s disadvantaged girls to find training and work. According to Louise Creighton, she "talked very little but we all liked to have her there".

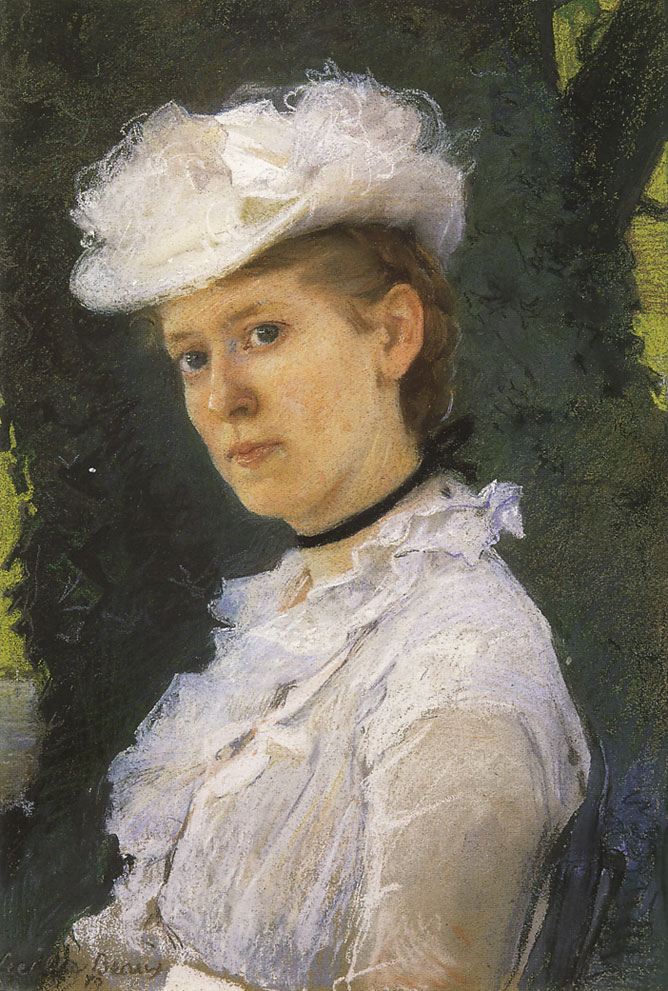
Maud Darwin in 1889

The American Maud Darwin, the youngest of the group, was married to George Darwin, Plumian Professor of Astronomy and Experimental Philosophy. According to her eldest daughter, the engraver Gwen Raverat, Maud had arrived in England with a great respect for culture, and eager to learn all she could. Nevertheless, "learning was never her strong point", and her real interest was people. She campaigned for the introduction of women police officers in Britain, publishing an article in The Nineteenth Century and After in 1914.

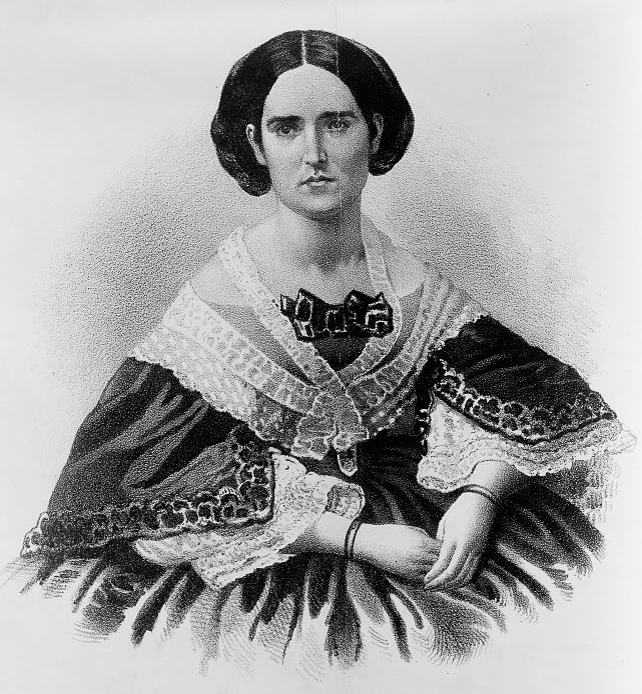
A young Caroline Jebb, in 1861

Caroline Jebb was Maud’s aunt and wife of the classical scholar Richard Claverhouse Jebb. Gwen Raverat later recalled her "amusing American turn of conversation, complete lack of inhibitions, and great personality".

Fanny Prothero, who was married to the historian George Prothero, was quieter, Louise Creighton recalling that at that time "she always wanted intimate talk with one person". Henry James, who later became a close friend and whom she nursed during his final illness, described her as "a little Irish lady … full of humour and humanity and curiosity and interrogation—too much interrogation".

Isy von Hügel's father was the hydrodynamicist and naval architect William Froude and her husband the ethnologist Baron Anatole von Hügel, the first curator of what would become the Cambridge Museum of Archeology and Anthropology. She was active along with her husband in promoting Roman Catholic education at the university.

== Later years, and legacy ==
In 1891 Mandell Creighton was appointed Bishop of Peterborough, and Louise Creighton reluctantly left Cambridge. She did not relish leaving the collegiate environment, and the move to Peterborough proved difficult for her. The group continued to meet, however, on occasion at the bishop’s palaces in Peterborough and later at Fulham.

With Kathleen Lyttelton having died in 1907, and several members having moved away from Cambridge, the society finally broke up with the coming of war in 1914.

The ODNB states that The Ladies Dining Society stands "as a testament to friendship and intellectual debate at a time when women’s voices went largely unheard".

== Bibliography ==
- Kennedy Smith, Ann (9 May 2018). "The Ladies Dining Society". Oxford Dictionary of National Biography. doi:10.1093/odnb/9780198614128.013.109658. ISBN 978-0-19-861412-8.
- Chothia, Jean (2018). "Feature Articles by Fellows: Kathleen Lyttelton (1856–1907)". Selwyn College Calendar, vol 125, 2017–2018. Selwyn College Cambridge. pp. 60–62.
- Raverat, Gwen (1952). Period Piece. London: Faber and Faber.
- Paley Marshall, Mary (1947). What I Remember. Cambridge University Press.
- Covert, James (2000). A Victorian Marriage: Mandell and Louise Creighton. London: Hambledon and London. ISBN 1-85285-260-7.
- Creighton, Louise (1994). Covert, James Thayne (ed.). Memoirs of a Victorian Woman: reflections of Louise Creighton, 1850–1936. Indiana University Press. ISBN 978-0-253-31469-7.
