= Ernest Crofts =

English artist (1847–1911)

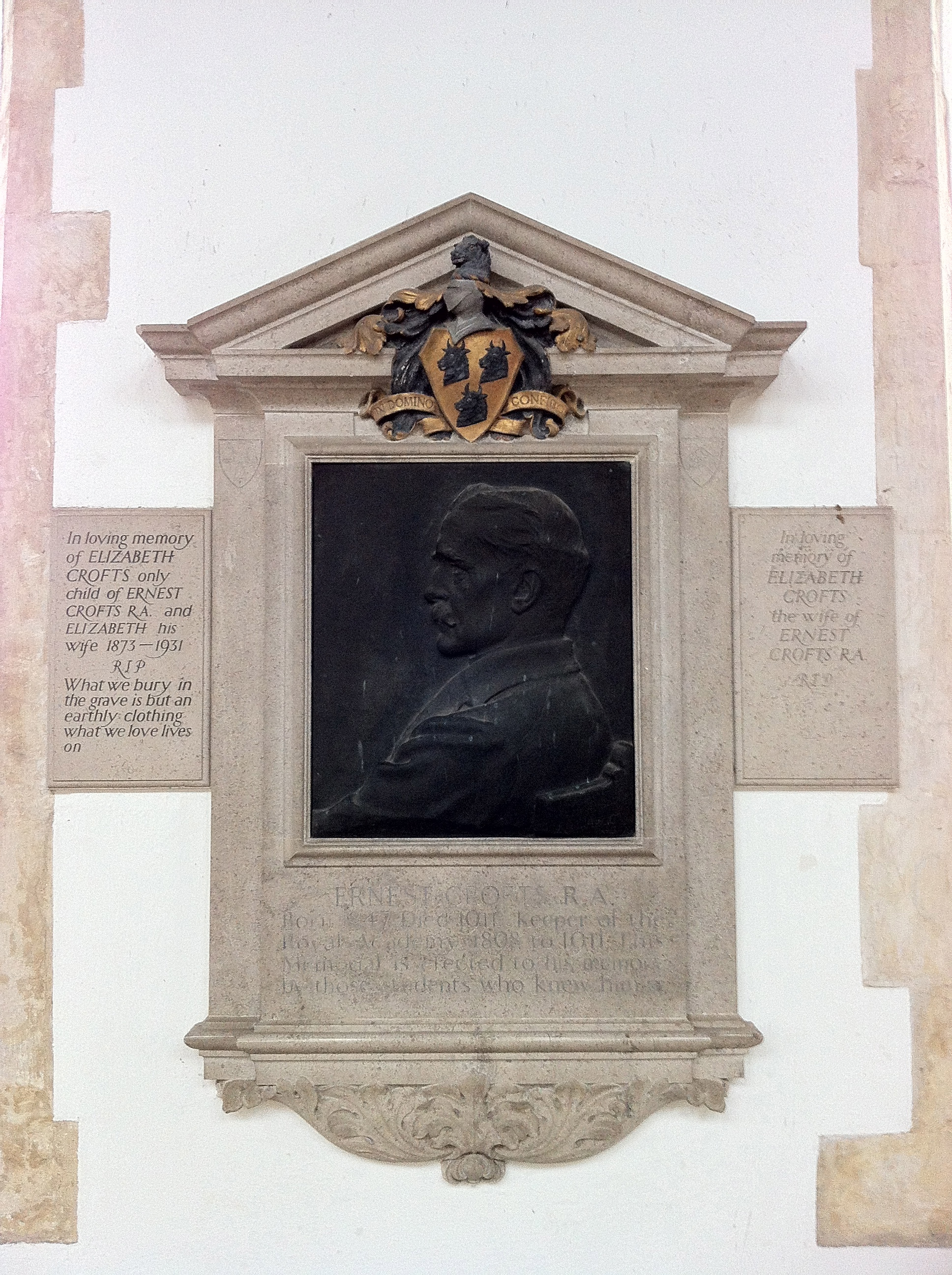
Memorial to Ernest Crofts in Holy Trinity Church, Blythburgh

Ernest Crofts RA (15 September 1847 – 19 March 1911) was an English artist who specialised in military art.

== Biography ==
Born in Leeds on 15 September 1847, Ernest was son of John Crofts, Esq. of Adal, near Leeds, a Justice of the Peace, and grandson of the Rev. W. Crofts, B.D., Vicar of North Grimston, near Malton, Yorkshire. One of his maternal uncles was the Rev. William Carr, B.D. of Bolton Abbey, Yorkshire. His mother was Ellen Wordsworth, the daughter of a Leeds industrialist. Ernest studied at Rugby School, for several years, and then headed to Berlin where he developed his interest in art and decided upon a career as a painter. His first acquaintance with war was made in 1864 when he accompanied a Prussian doctor in the Schleswig-Holstein War, and the operations around Düppel. His sister Ellen Wordsworth Crofts married Sir Francis Darwin and was the mother of poet Frances Cornford.

He returned to London and became a pupil under A. B. Clay, but was back in Germany a few years later, this time studying at the Düsseldorf school of painting in Europe, where he studied under the German military artist, Emil Hünten, himself an ex-pupil of Horace Vernet, and at the time military and historical painter to the Prussian emperor. Under Hünten, Crofts' talent as a military painter grew, and in 1874, he exhibited Retreat, representing an episode in the Franco-Prussian War during the Battle of Gravelotte, and in the same year, another scene from the same conflict, One touch of nature makes the whole world kin which won him the Crystal Palace prize medal. Both scenes were influenced by the artist's experience of witnessing some of the closing stages of the war, especially the battles of Weissenbourg, Wörth, and the siege of Strasbourg. While contributing regularly to the annual Royal Academy exhibition, he continued to live in Düsseldorf where he met his future wife.

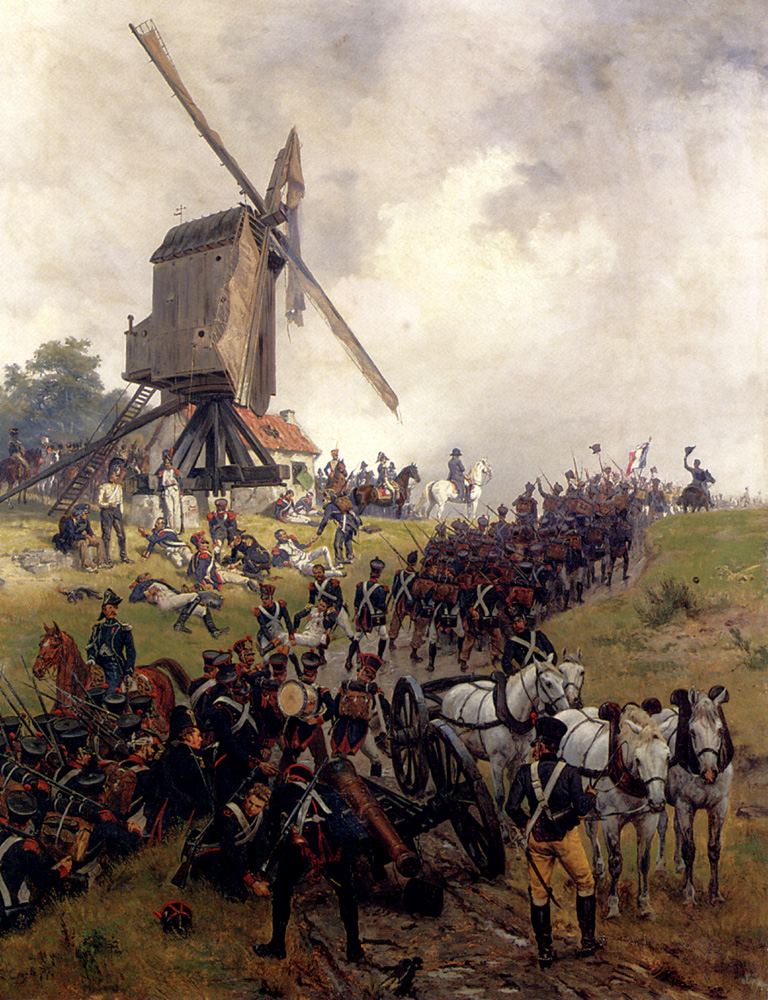
Ligny by Ernest Crofts (1875)

In 1875, Crofts exhibited Ligny at the Royal Academy of Arts (RA) and at the International Exhibition in Philadelphia. The following year saw his picture representing The morning of the Battle of Waterloo which captured the dawn of the day with the tired and bespattered troops. One critic described it as follows: "Mr. Crofts' large canvas is admirable in the grouping of the soldiers on the morning of the battle; the day is breaking, on a weary, wounded and mud-stained company, some lying on the bare ground with knapsacks for pillows, some up and preparing for the march. The artillery are just on the move, and the note of preparation is sounding. The tone of the picture reminds us of the French school". The artist's first notable pictures of the English Civil War were exhibited in 1877, one of which depicted Oliver Cromwell at Marston Moor. In the same year, he refused the offer of an appointment of military painter to the Prince of Roumania to be attached to his staff during the Russo-Turkish War.

Crofts was elected an Associate of the RA on 19 July 1878, the year that his picture, Wellington on his march from Quatre Bras to Waterloo was shown. In the same year, his painting entitled The Morning of the Battle of Waterloo was shown at the Paris International Exhibition; this depicted the French army retiring from the battlefield, with Napoleon leaving his carriage and preparing to mount his horse. The artist walked and sketched much of the area around the battlefield of Waterloo including La Haye Sainte, Hougoumont and La Belle Alliance. In 1896, he was elected a full academician of the Royal Academy, and his Diploma Work, a Civil War scene, was entitled To the Rescue. Two years later he succeeded Philip Calderon as keeper and trustee of the RA, which gave him accommodation at Burlington House. He was in effect chief director of the academy art schools as well as chief custodian of the Diploma Galley, which required "firmness, kindness and tact," according to one obituary, and Crofts was noted for his "pleasant manner, his good looks, and his amiability of character" which made him an ideal keeper.

Besides historical scenes, Crofts did paint some contemporary military events. In 1901, for instance, the king commissioned him to paint a picture of the distribution of the war medals following the Boer War. Two years later, he painted a large scene of the funeral of Queen Victoria. One of his most ambitious works was the panel in the ambulatory of the Royal Exchange which portrayed Elizabeth I opening the first Royal Exchange in 1571. His trilogy of paintings chronicling the final moments, death and burial of Charles I were popular, but there was some disagreement over the representation of the block upon which the king knelt to be beheaded. Some argued about the accuracy, contending that the block of the period was a lower one, being just a few inches from the ground, and that to reach it, the king would have had to lie flat.

Crofts lived at 'The Green' which he helped to re-design, next to Blythburgh church in Suffolk. He had married a German lady, Elizabeth Wüsthofen of Düsseldorf, and they had one daughter. The artist died of pneumonia at Burlington House on 19 March 1911. His funeral service was held at St. James's Church, Piccadilly, on Thursday 23 March, followed by his burial at Kensal Green Cemetery. A sale of his remaining works was held at Christie, Manson & Woods on Monday 18 December 1911.

While Crofts's pictures were popular in the 1870s and 1880s, the public lost its appetite for war paintings in the early years of the 20th century following the setbacks in South Africa. His obituary noted that "his taste was a little theatrical, and his talent not good enough to redeem it...it is safe to say that he will be best remembered, not by them, but by his good work at the Academy Schools and by his administrative services to the body of which he was a useful member...the exacting taste of the present day asks for something less conventional than his rather superficial battle scenes". While the artist's pictures continue to be used as illustration in history and military books, today he is rarely mentioned as a significant historical artist.

== Paintings (selection) ==
- After Flodden—King James IV of Scotland: mounted & mortally wounded (1877)
- The Gunpowder Plot (1892)
- Wallenstein: A Scene of the Thirty Years' War (1884 – Leeds Art Gallery)
- The Opening the first Royal Exchange by Queen Elizabeth 23 January 1570. (1899) Mural at the Royal Exchange, London

=== English Civil War ===
- Oliver Cromwell at the Battle of Marston Moor (1877)
- Prince Rupert and Staff (1875 – Ipswich Museums and Art Galleries)
- Ironsides returning from sacking a Cavalier's House (1877)
- Charles I on his way to Execution (1883)
- At the Sign of the Blue Boar, Holborn (Cromwell questioning a prisoner) (1883 – Dudley Museum and Art Gallery)
- The return from a raid (1886)
- The Boscobel Oak (1889)
- Hampden riding away from Chalgrove Field (1889)
- Whitehall, January 30, 1649 (1890)
- A Parliamentary Convoy surprised by Royalists (1891)
- Charles I at Battle of Edgehill (1892)
- Prince Rupert (1893)
- Roundheads Victorious (1894)
- Cromwell questioning a Prisoner (1895 – Mappin Art Gallery, Sheffield)
- To the Rescue: An Episode of the Civil War (Diploma Work, 1896 – Royal Academy of Art)
- Charles II at Whiteladies after the Battle of Worcester (1898)
- Oliver Cromwell at the storming of Basing House (1900 – Leeds Art Gallery)
- The Surrender of Donnington Castle (1903)
- Prince Rupert and his staff at Marston Moor (1903)
- Funeral of King Charles I, St. George's Chapel, Windsor (1907)
- The surrender of the City of York to the Roundheads (1908)
- Cromwell after the Battle of Marston Moor (1909 – Towneley Hall Art Gallery and Museum, Burnley)

=== Nine Years' War ===
- William III at Landen

=== War of the Spanish Succession ===
- Marlborough at the head of his troops
- Leading the way
- Cavalry on the road
- Marlborough after the Battle of Ramillies

=== War of the Austrian Succession ===
- George II at Dettingen

=== Napoleonic Wars ===
- Ligny. "With might unquestion'd: power to save, etc." (1875)
- On the morning of the Battle of Waterloo (1876 – Mappin Art Gallery, Sheffield)
- Wellington's march from Quatre Bras to Waterloo (1876 – Mappin Art Gallery, Sheffield)
- On the evening of the Battle of Waterloo (1879 – Walker Art Gallery, Liverpool) * A pause in the attack – Hougoumont, Waterloo (1881 – Cavalry and Guards Club, London)
- A pause in the attack – Hougoumont, Waterloo (1882)
- At the Farm of Mont St. Jean (1882)
- Napoleon leaving Moscow (1887)
- The morning of Waterloo: Napoleon's headquarters (1891)
- Napoleon's last grand attack at Waterloo (1895)
- The Capture of a French Battery by the 52nd Regiment at Waterloo (1896 – Royal Green Jackets (Rifles) Museum)
- The attack on the gatehouse of the chateau of Hougoumont (1897)
- Near La Belle Alliance at dawn, June 18th, 1815 (1906)

=== Post Waterloo ===
- Charge of the 3rd King's Own Light Dragoons, Moodkee (1893 – Queen's Own Hussars)
- A Retreat: Episode in the German-French War (1874)
- 1870 – An incident in the Franco-Prussian War (1874)
- "One touch of nature makes the whole world kin" (Prussian soldier giving refreshment to wounded Frenchman, 1870) (1873)

== Gallery ==
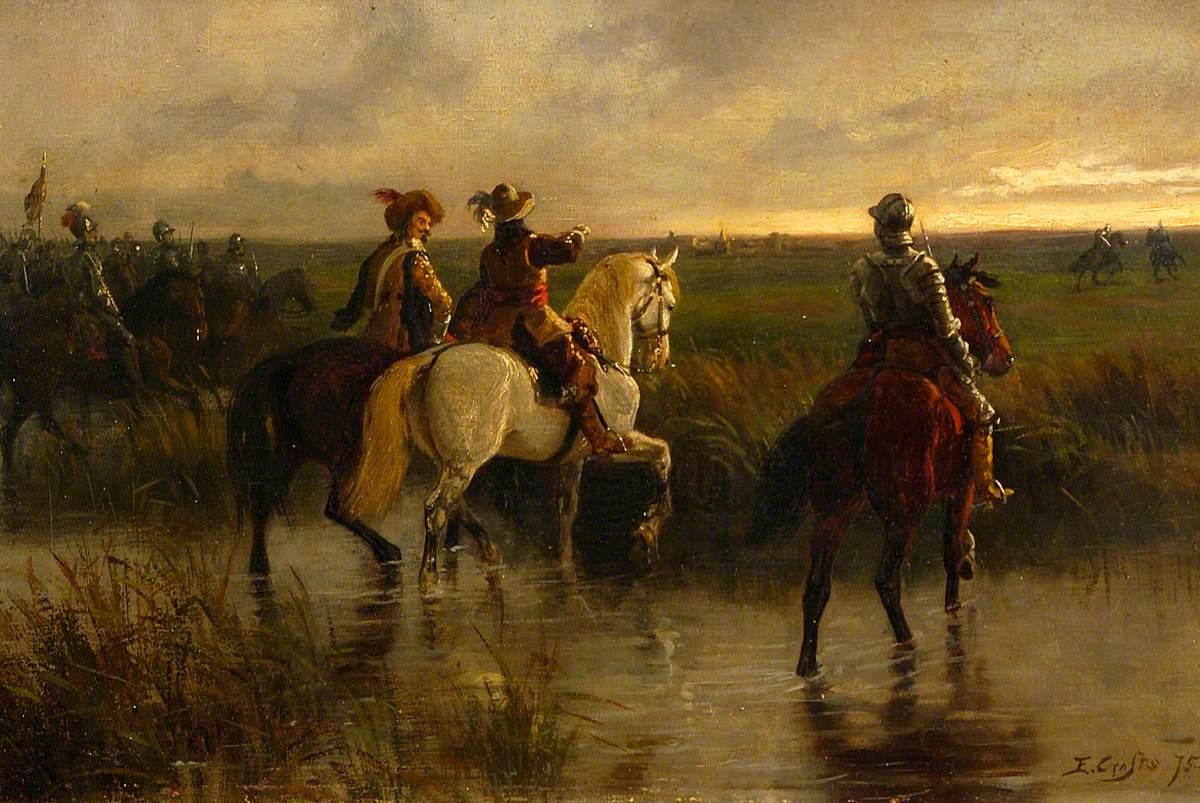
Prince Rupert and Staff, 1875

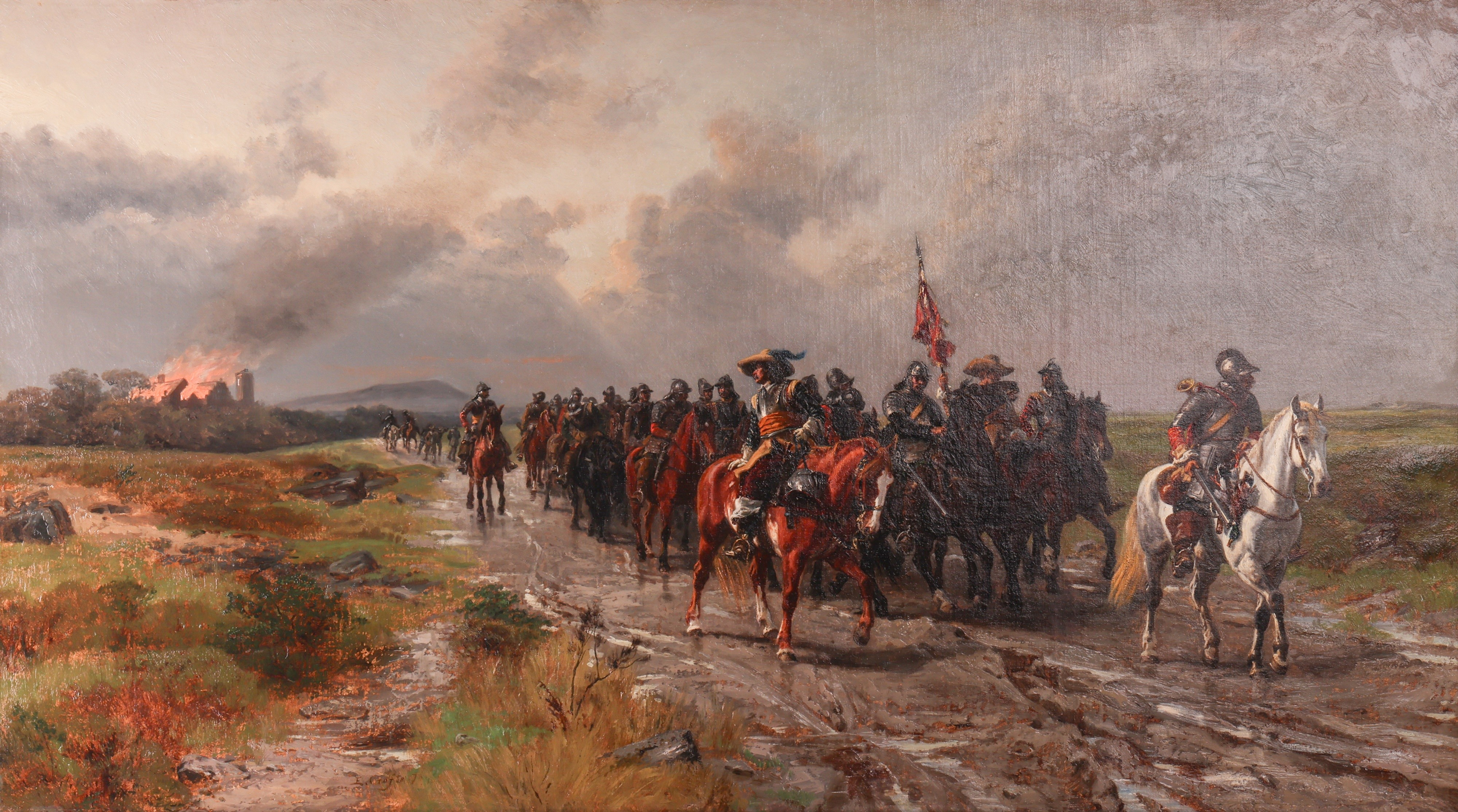
Ironsides Returning from Sacking a Cavalier's House, 1876

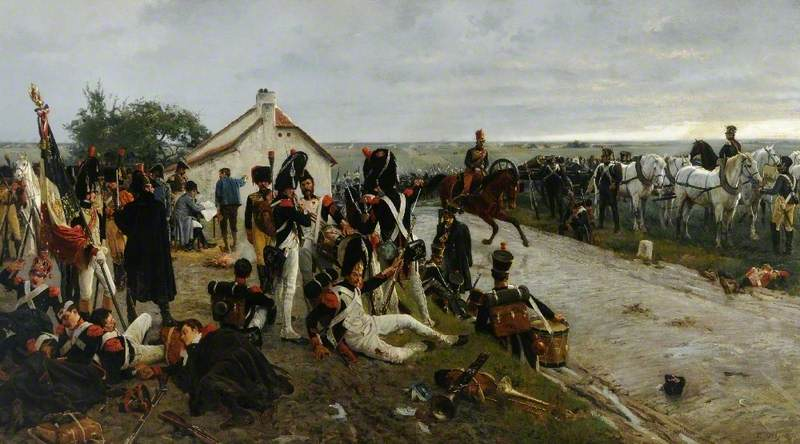
The Morning of the Battle of Waterloo, 1876

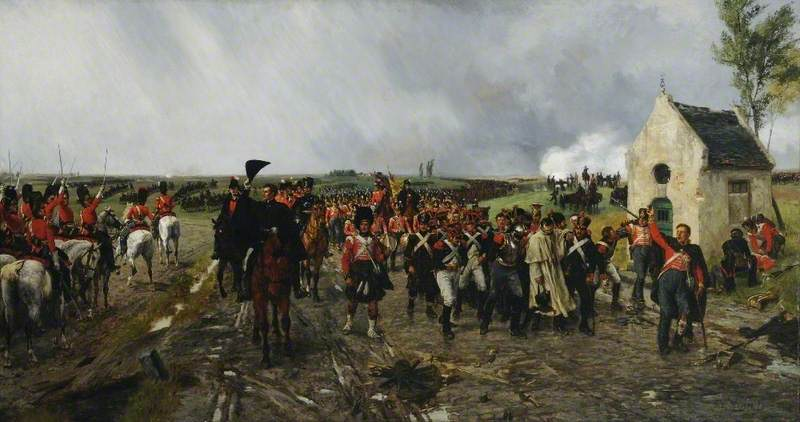
Wellington's March from Quatre Bras to Waterloo, 1878

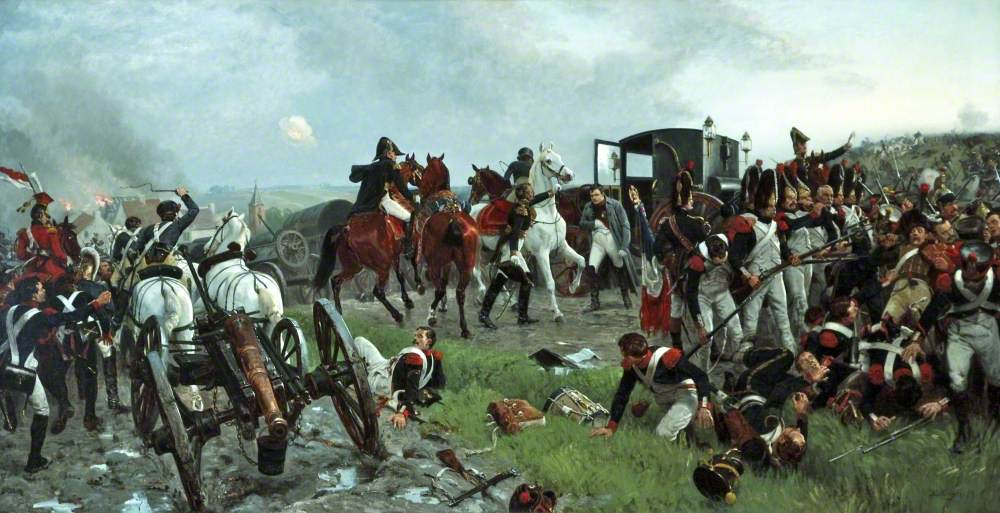
On the Evening of the Battle of Waterloo, 1879

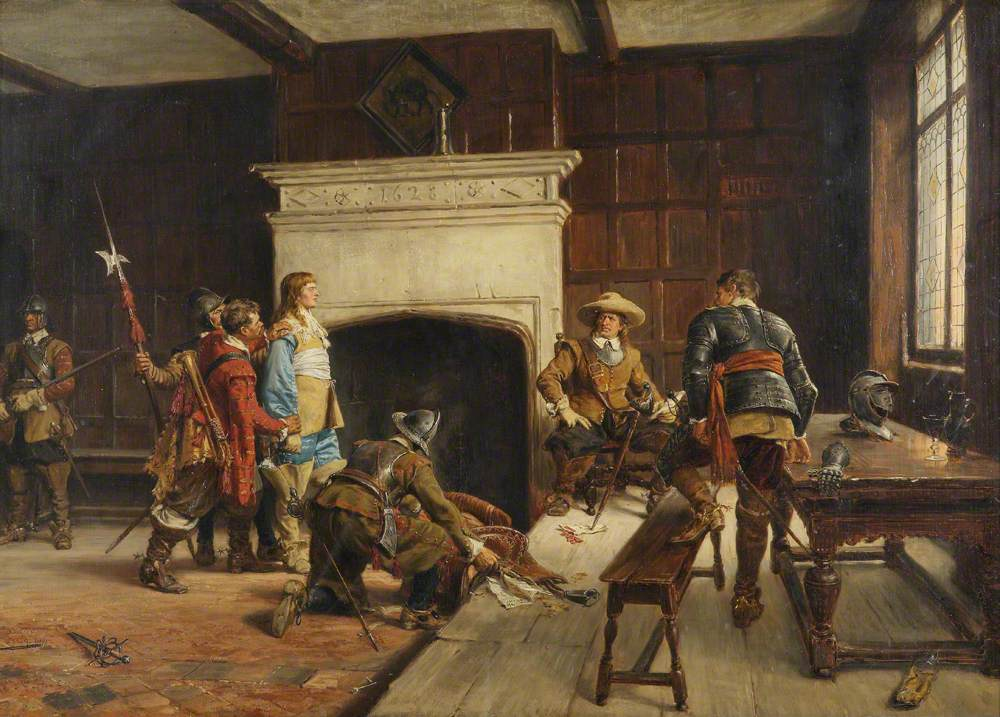
Cromwell at the Blue Boar, Holborn, 1883

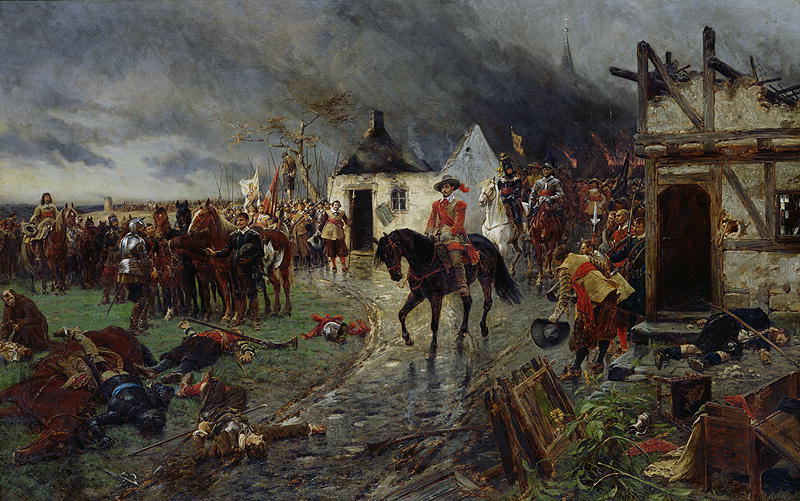
Wallenstein, A Scene of the Thirty Years War, 1884

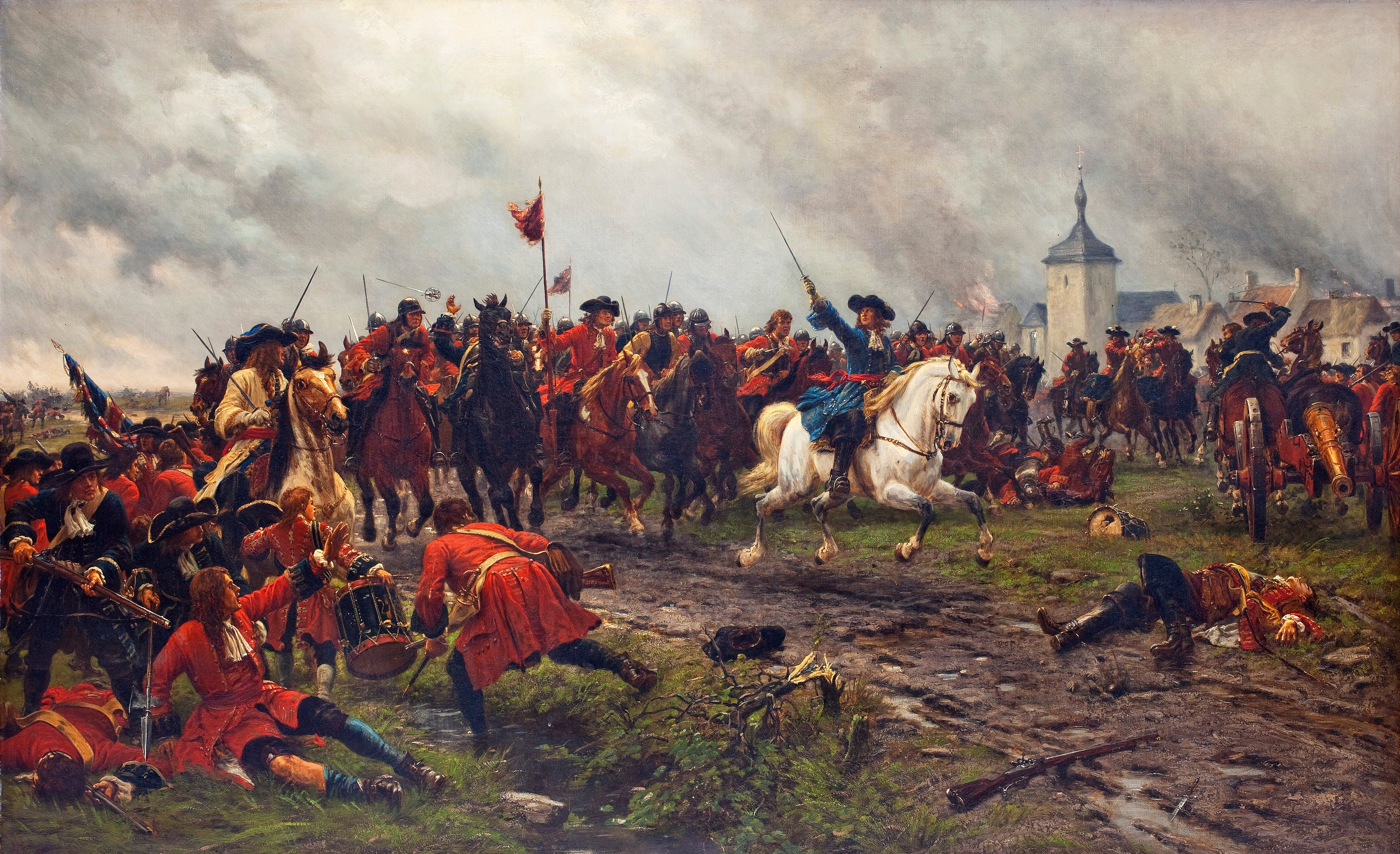
William III at the Battle of Landen, 1885

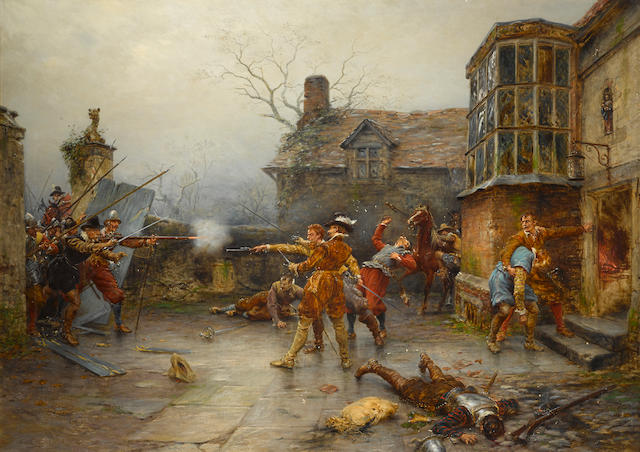
The Gunpowder Plot, 1892

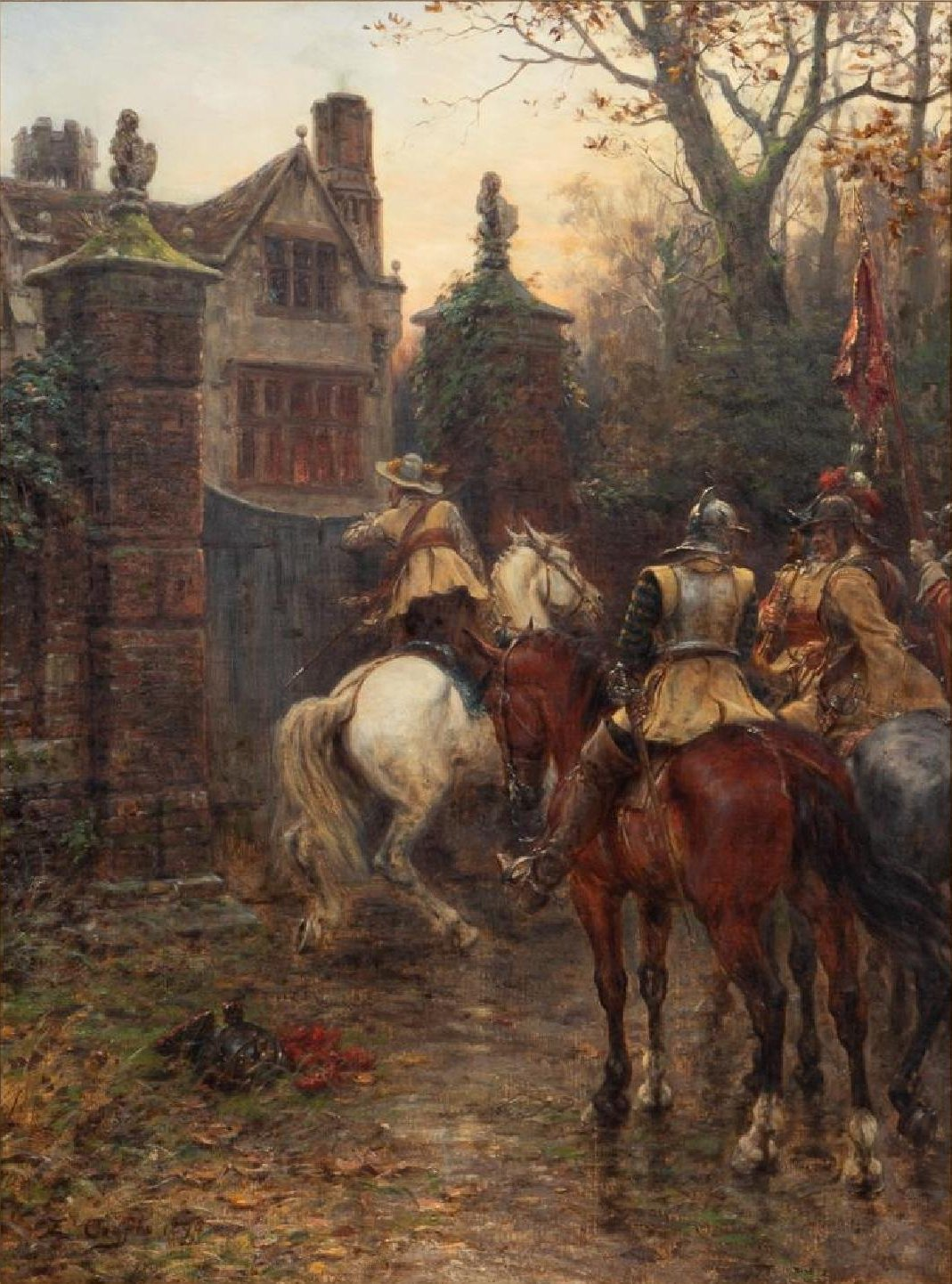
Unexpected Visitors, 1894

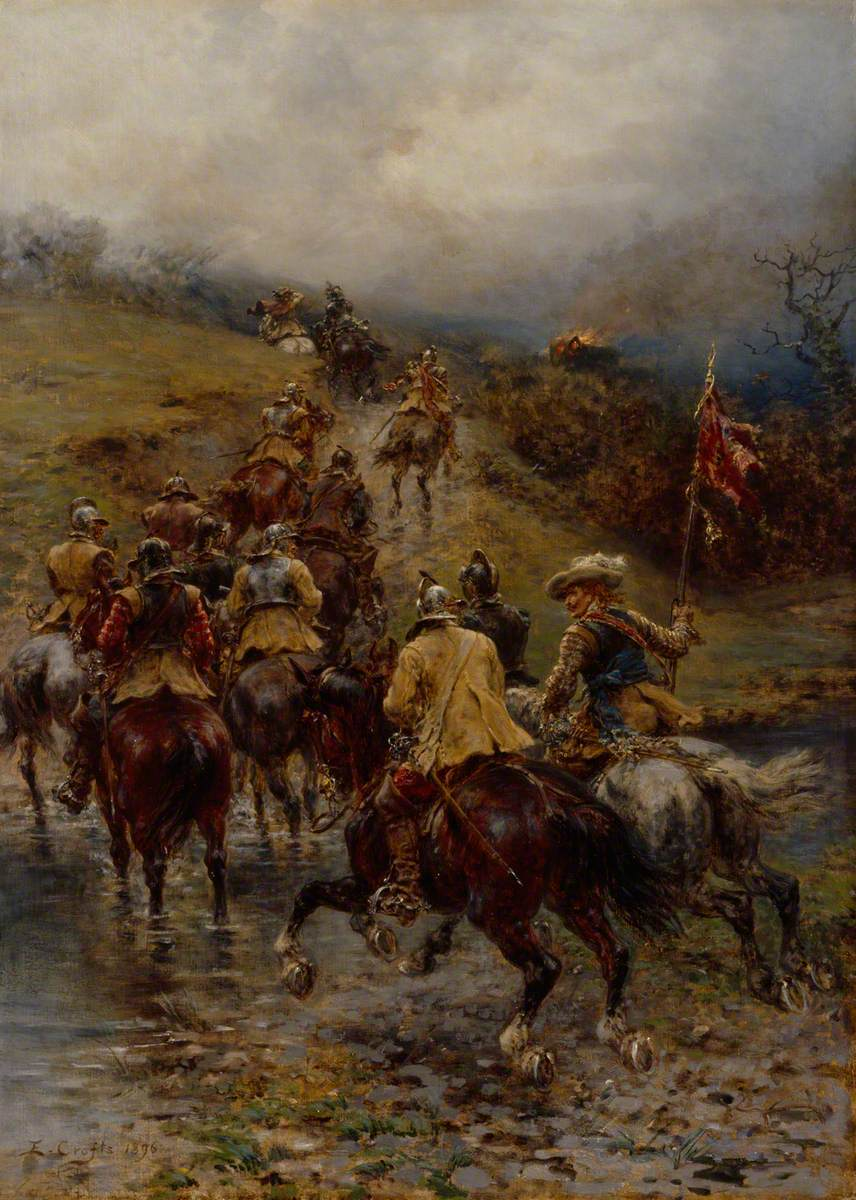
To the Rescue, 1896

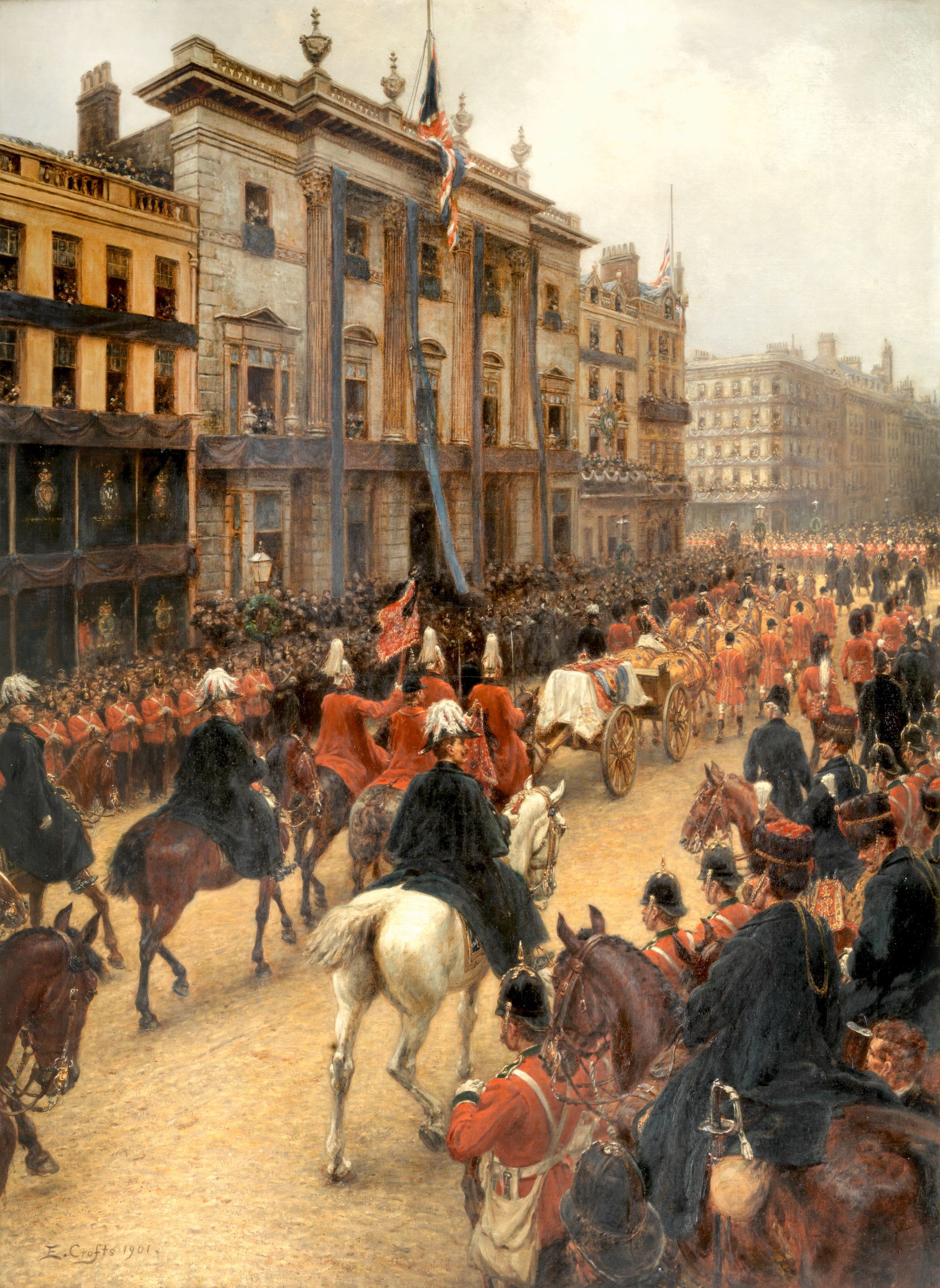
Funeral of Her late Majesty Queen Victoria, 1901

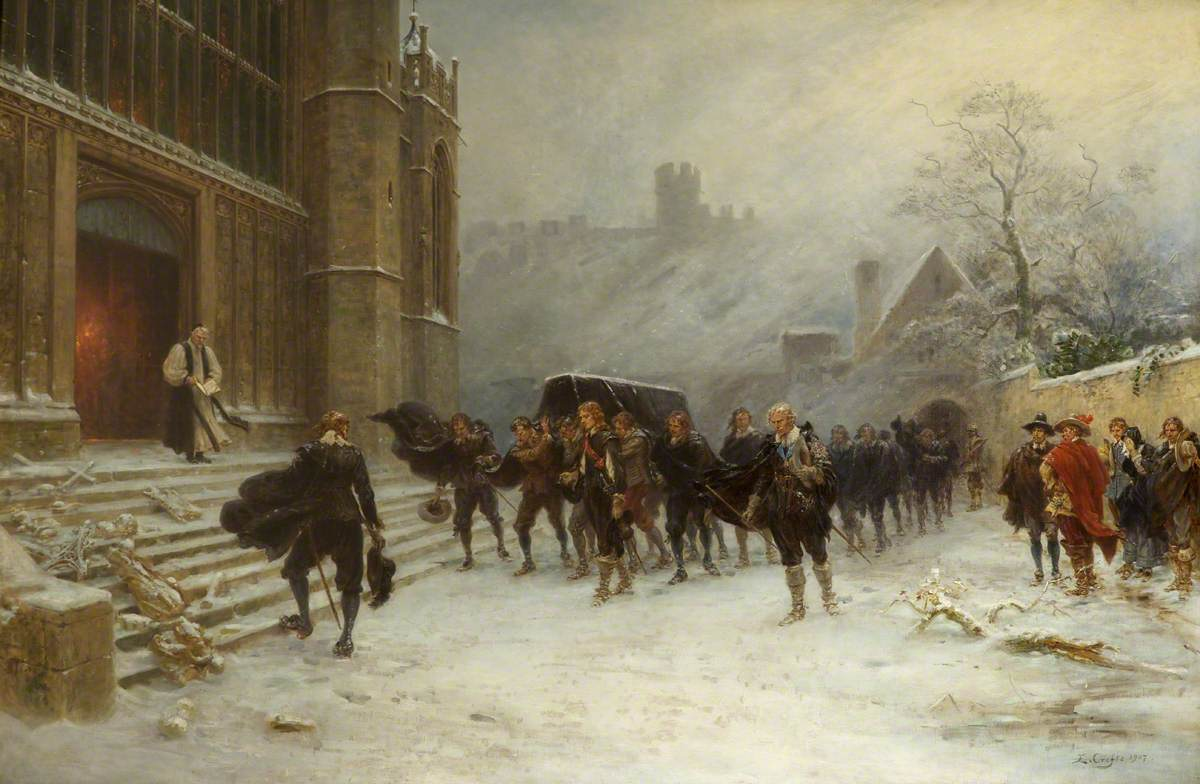
Funeral of Charles I, St George's Chapel, Windsor, 1649, 1907

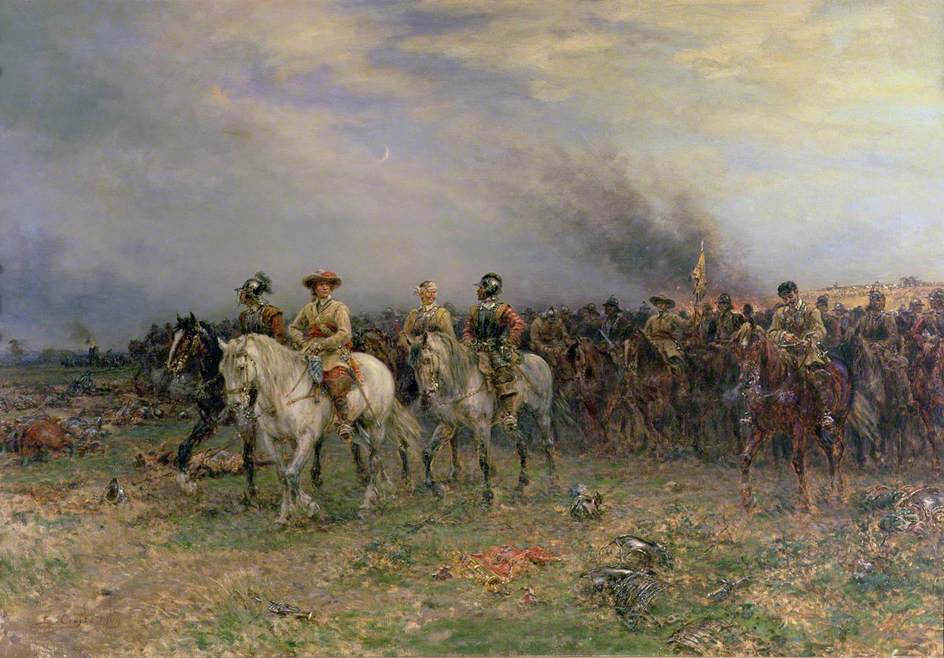
Cromwell after the Battle of Marston Moor, 1909

== Works about ==
- Chester, Austin, "The Art of Mr. Ernest Crofts, R.A.," – Windsor Magazine, March 1909, pp. 455–468.
- Harrington, Peter. (1993). British Artists and War: The Face of Battle in Paintings and Prints, 1700–1914. London: Greenhill.
- K., P. G., "Ernest Crofts (1847–1911)," in Dictionary of National Biography, page 444.
- Spielmann, M.H., "Battle-Painting and Mr. Ernest Crofts, R.A.'" – Cassell's Magazine, Dec. 1901-May, 1902, pp. 421–429.
