= Louise Creighton =

British activist and writer (1850–1936)

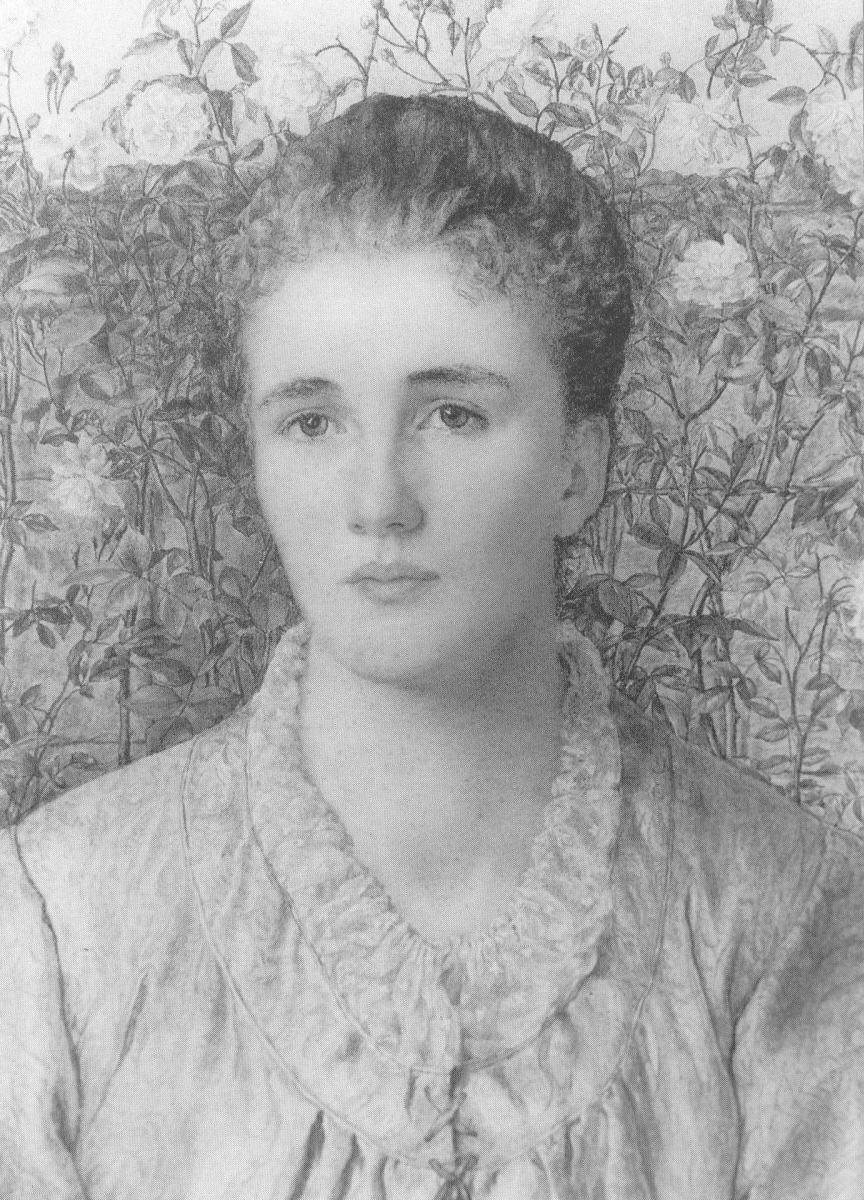
Portrait of Louise Creighton aged 27 by Bertha Johnson, 1878.

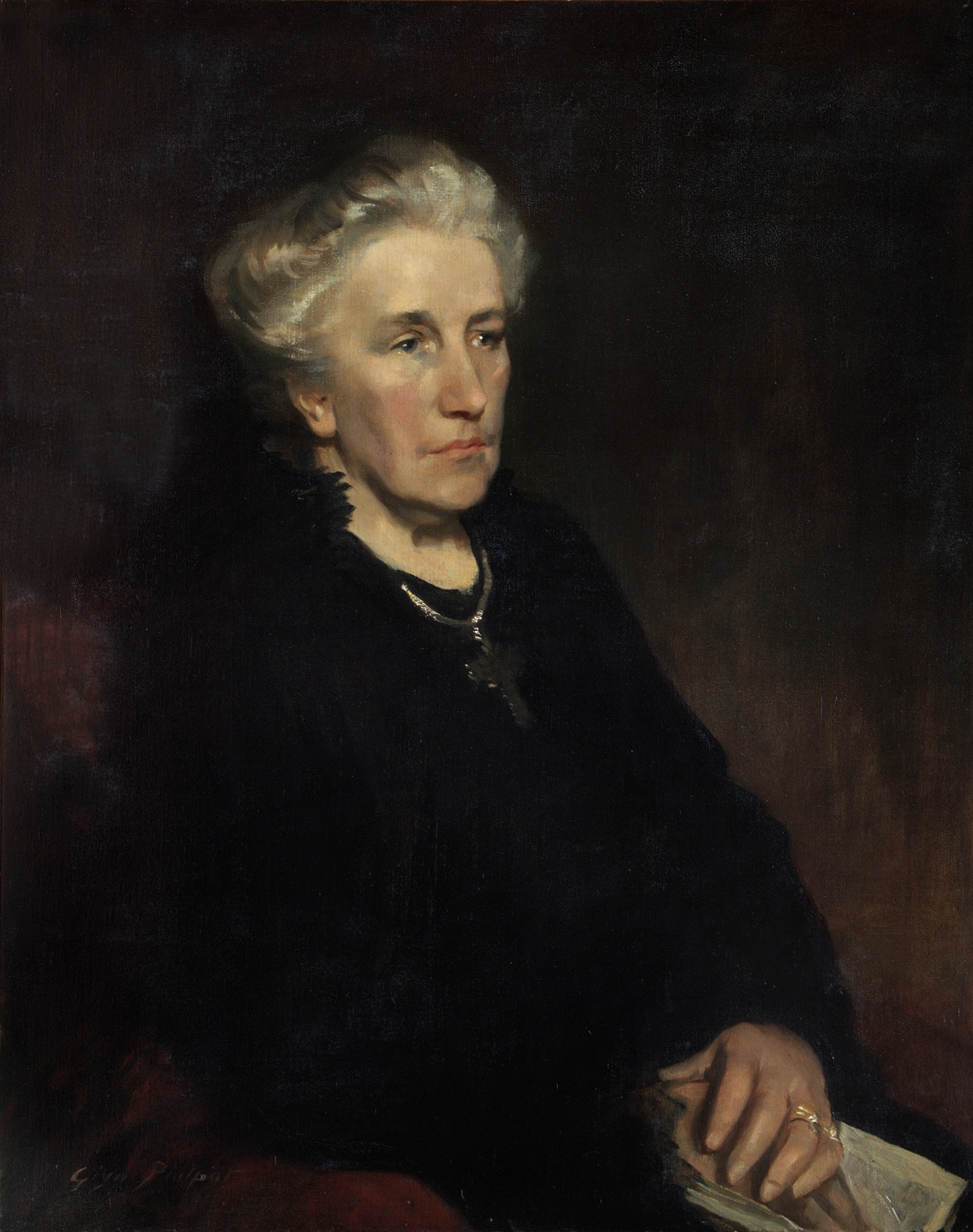
Louise Creighton, Wife of Mandell Creighton, Bishop of London, by Glyn Philpot

Louise Hume Creighton (née von Glehn; 7 July 1850 – 15 April 1936) was a British author of books on historical and sociopolitical topics, and an activist for higher education of women at Oxford, and their greater participation in society, including women's suffrage, and in the leadership of the Church of England.

== Early life ==
Born at Peak Hill Lodge in Sydenham, Kent on 7 July 1850, Louise Hume von Glehn was the tenth child of Robert von Glehn, a City of London merchant of German and Scottish ancestry, who had been born in Reval, Estonia. Her mother was Agnes Duncan, Scottish stepdaughter of a London merchant. Her older brother was Alfred de Glehn, designer of the French steam locomotive engine.

She was homeschooled before undertaking higher education. She passed, with honours, the General Examination for Women, the first London University higher examination for women. She was a prolific reader and a keen student of the writings of both John Ruskin and the Whigs historian John Richard Green.

== Marriage to Mandell Creighton ==
In 1872, Louise married Mandell Creighton, a University of Oxford-educated historian. He later became a University of Cambridge Professor in ecclesiastical history, and was appointed Church of England bishop of Peterborough, in 1891, and London, in 1897. The couple had seven children: Beatrice 1872, Lucia 1874, Cuthbert 1876, Walter 1878, Mary 1880, Oswin 1883; and Gemma 1887.

Creighton, Mary Augusta Ward and Charlotte Byron Green were among the "don's wives" who organised lectures for women in Oxford from 1873. They joined the Association for Promoting the Education of Women in Oxford five years later.

== Women's rights advocacy ==
In 1885, Creighton founded the National Union of Women Workers with Lady Laura Ridding and Emily Janes. Although called a union, its purpose was to co-ordinate the voluntary efforts of women and to "promote sympathy of thought and purpose among the women of Great Britain and Ireland." Creighton was its first president. The organisation was later renamed the National Council of Women of Great Britain.

In 1890, Creighton and Kathleen Lyttelton jointly founded the Ladies Dining Society. Many of its members were associated with Newnham College, one of the first Cambridge colleges offering University level education to women. Members included the college's principal Eleanor Sidgwick, economist Mary Paley Marshall, classicist Margaret Verrall, Newnham lecturers Mary Jane Ward and Ellen Wordsworth Darwin; mental health campaigner Ida Darwin, Baroness Eliza von Hügel, and US socialites Caroline Jebb and Maud Darwin. After Creighton moved away, she still invited the group to visit her in Peterborough and Fulham. The society met in Cambridge until the First World War.

Creighton was a popular author, particularly of historical biographies and stories for children, including the successful "Child's First History of England".

== Later career ==
After the death of her husband in 1901, Creighton became an influential advocate for women's suffrage and social reform. As well as writing and editing books, she served on two Royal Commissions and the Joint Committee of Insurance Commissioners.

As a member of the Standing Committee of the Society for the Propagation of the Gospel, she helped promote the work of women missionaries and took a leading role chairing the women's meetings at the Pan-Anglican Congress of 1908.

After nearly twenty years living in a grace-and-favour apartment at Hampton Court Palace, Creighton moved back to Oxford in the late 1920s, and subsequently served on the governing board of Lady Margaret Hall. After a period of declining health, she died on 15 April 1936, and her cremated remains were buried in St Paul's Cathedral, London in the grave of her husband.

== See also ==
- Merton College, Oxford
- Sydenham

== Notes ==
Non-profit organization positions
Preceded by New position	President of the National Union of Women Workers; 1895–1897	Succeeded by Mrs Alfred Booth
