= Arthur Lyttelton =

First Master of Selwyn College, Cambridge

The Right Reverend and Honourable Arthur Lyttelton
- Bishop of Southampton
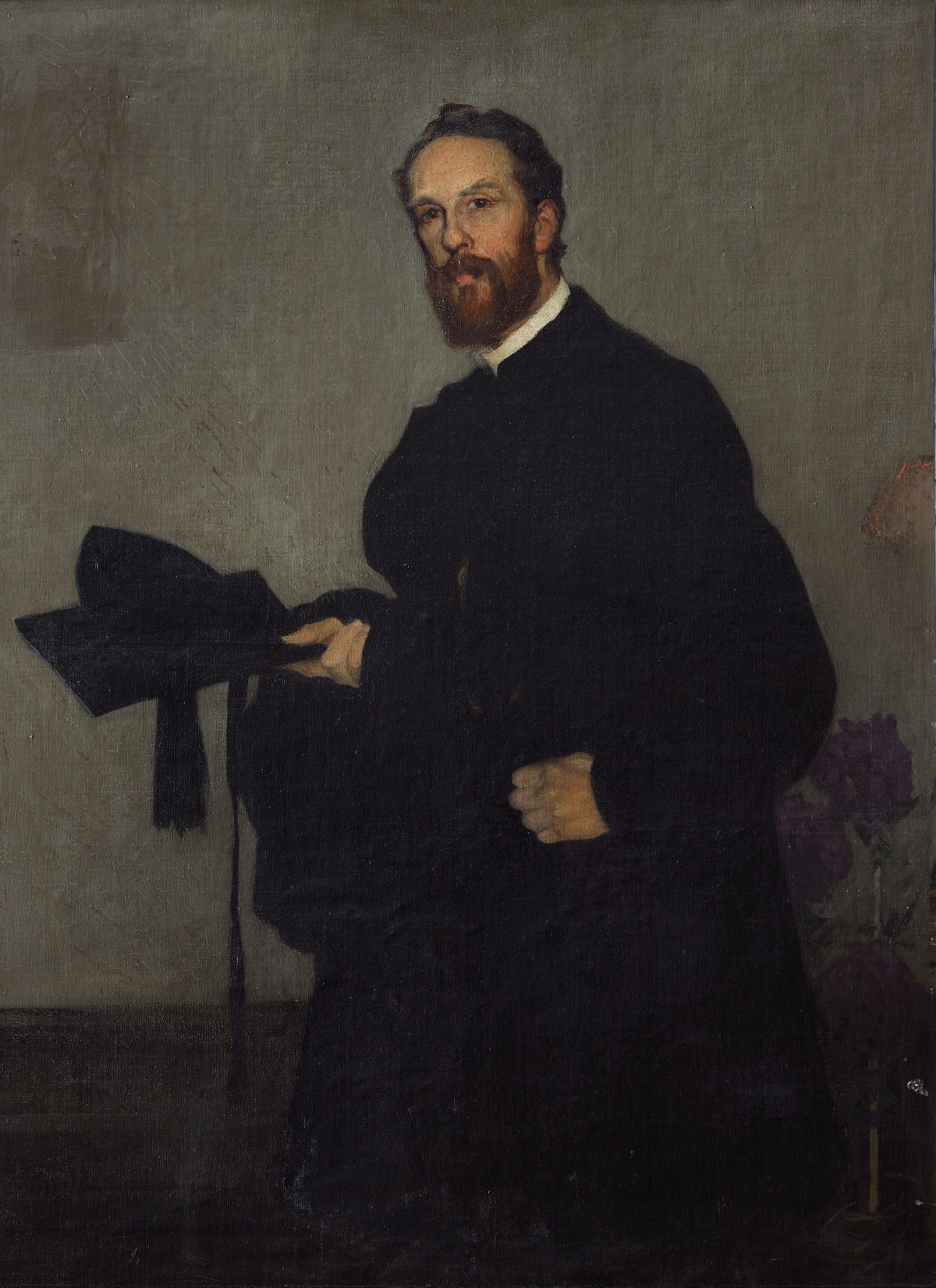
- As Master of Selwyn College, Cambridge
- Church: Church of England
- Diocese: Winchester
- Appointed: 1898
- Term ended: 1903
- Predecessor: George Fisher
- Successor: James Macarthur

Orders
- Ordination: 1876

Personal details
- Born: Arthur Temple Lyttelton; 7 January 1852 Westminster, London, England
- Died: 19 February 1903 (aged 51) Petersfield, Hampshire, England
- Parents: George Lyttelton, 4th Baron Lyttelton and Mary Glynne
- Spouse: Kathleen Mary (née Clive)
- Children: Margaret Lucy, Archer Geoffrey, Stephen Clive
- Education: Eton College; Trinity College, Cambridge

Arthur Temple Lyttelton (7 January 1852 – 19 February 1903) was an Anglican Bishop from the Lyttelton family. After studying at Eton College and Cambridge University, he was ordained as a priest in 1877, and was a curate at St Mary's in Reading. He later served as vicar in Eccles, before being appointed as the third Suffragan Bishop of Southampton. He gave and published a number of lectures relating to his faith, and was the Hulsean Lecturer in 1891. He was also one of eleven members of the Lyttelton family to play first-class cricket.

After a short time as a tutor at Keble College, Oxford, he became the first Master of Selwyn College, Cambridge.

== Early life and education ==
Arthur Lyttelton was born in Westminster, London, on 7 Jan 1852, the fifth son of George Lyttelton, 4th Baron Lyttelton and his first wife Mary Glynne. He attended Eton College, followed by Trinity College, Cambridge, from which he graduated with a Bachelor of Arts degree in 1874. He was awarded his MA degree in 1877.

== School and university cricket ==
Lyttelton played a match for the "Gentlemen of Worcestershire" in 1866, when he was 14, playing alongside two of his older brothers, Charles and George. The Lyttelton family was closely associated with cricket in Worcestershire, and most of the family appeared for the county at some time. He played for Eton in his final year at the school, and appeared in the annual fixture against Harrow that year, his performance being of little note. Eton won the match by 21 runs, in which Lyttelton scored two runs in the first innings and remained not out with five runs in the second. He batted at number ten in both innings, and did not bowl. He suffered a pair during a match between Worcestershire and Herefordshire in 1871. During his time at Cambridge University, Lyttelton frequently appeared for the Quidnuncs Cricket Club, a cricket club generally populated by former university cricketers who had earned a blue.

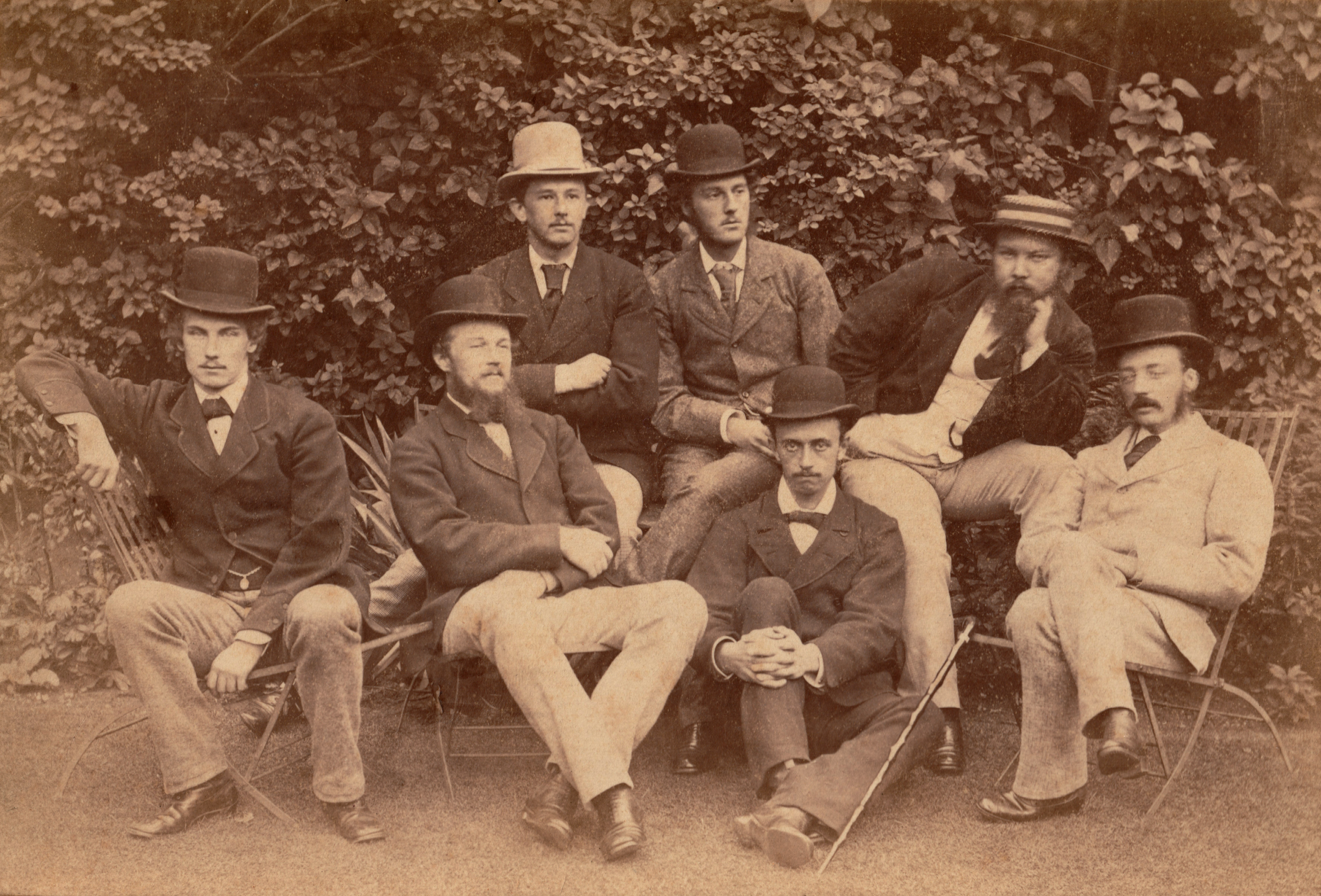
Lyttelton (centre of back row) in 1873, Shakespeare Society, Trinity College, Cambridge

He never played first-class cricket for the university, but did appear against them in one match in 1872; his only first-class appearance. Lyttelton was part of the Marylebone Cricket Club (MCC) team which played the university at Lord's Cricket Ground in June that year. He batted at number seven, and after scoring a duck in the first innings, he scored four runs in the second of a low-scoring match in which only W. G. Grace passed 50 runs in an innings. He made a second appearance for the MCC that summer, as part of a side which beat a Worcestershire team containing two of his brothers by three wickets. He played little more notable cricket, turning out for the Quidnuncs and the Free Foresters infrequently. He was described in Scores and Biographies as being "Like the rest of the family he is a fine free hitter, and an excellent field at long-leg, or middle-wicket-off."

== After graduation ==
Lyttelton was ordained as a deacon in Oxford in 1876, and as a priest the following year. He began his career with a curacy at St Mary's, Reading, and in 1879 became a tutor at Keble College, Oxford, a post he retained until 1882.

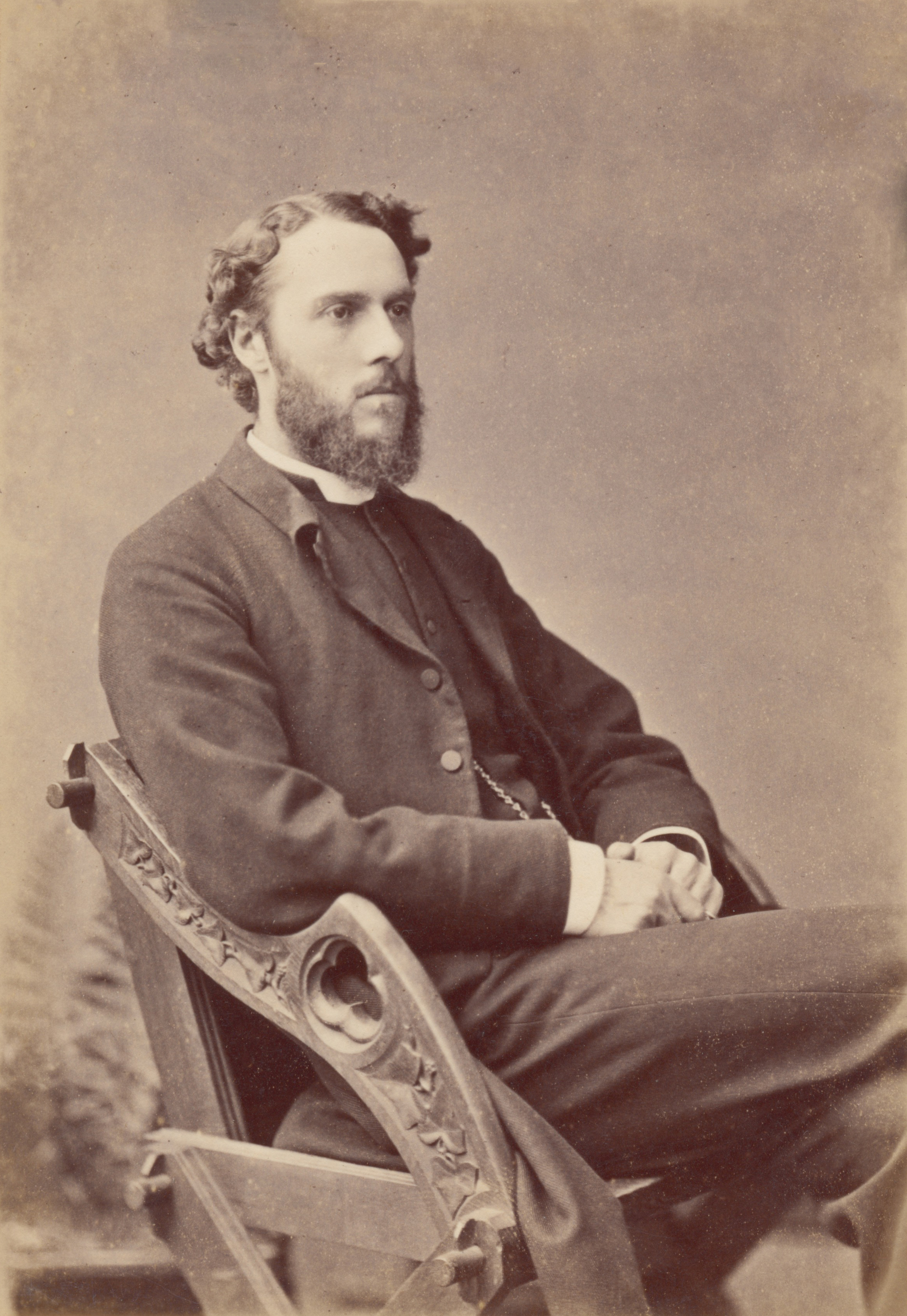
Shortly after his marriage in 1880

In 1880 he married the women's activist Mary Kathleen Clive, daughter of the Liberal politician George Clive; they had three children: Margaret Lucy, Archer Geoffrey, and Stephen Clive.

== Selwyn College ==
In 1882 Lyttelton moved with his wife to Cambridge to take up the post of first master of Selwyn College. When they arrived, the college was still a building site with only the West front completed. Initially, they made do with a suite of adapted student rooms until the Master's Lodge was built.

Lyttelton's moderate political views along with his political connections to the prime minister (his aunt was Gladstone's wife, and his brother served as his private secretary) helped ensure acceptance of the new institution within the university. However, he did cause some consternation when he ruled that in general only members of the Church of England would be admitted to the college, despite government acts of 1856 and 1871 which allowed undergraduates and faculty members of any religion, or no religion, to be admitted.

He was described in a history of the college as a "fine teacher and a reserved, aloof-seeming man of judgement, decision and piety."

== Return to church work ==
In 1893 Lyttelton returned to ecclesiastical work, taking up the post of Vicar of Eccles. He was an Honorary Chaplain to Queen Victoria from 1895 until the following year when he was appointed as Chaplain in Ordinary to the Queen, a position in which he served until 1898. He was Lady Margaret's Preacher in each of 1885 and 1897, delivering the Hulsean Lectures in 1891. He was briefly named as an Honorary Canon of Manchester in 1898, but later that year ascended to the episcopate as the Bishop of Southampton, suffragan to the Bishop of Winchester. In the same year, he was appointed Provost of St. Nicholas College, Lancing, West Sussex. In 1900 he was appointed Archdeacon of Winchester.

Lyttelton was one of a number of contributors to Lux Mundi. He was granted a Doctorate in Divinity from the University of Cambridge in 1899.

== Death ==
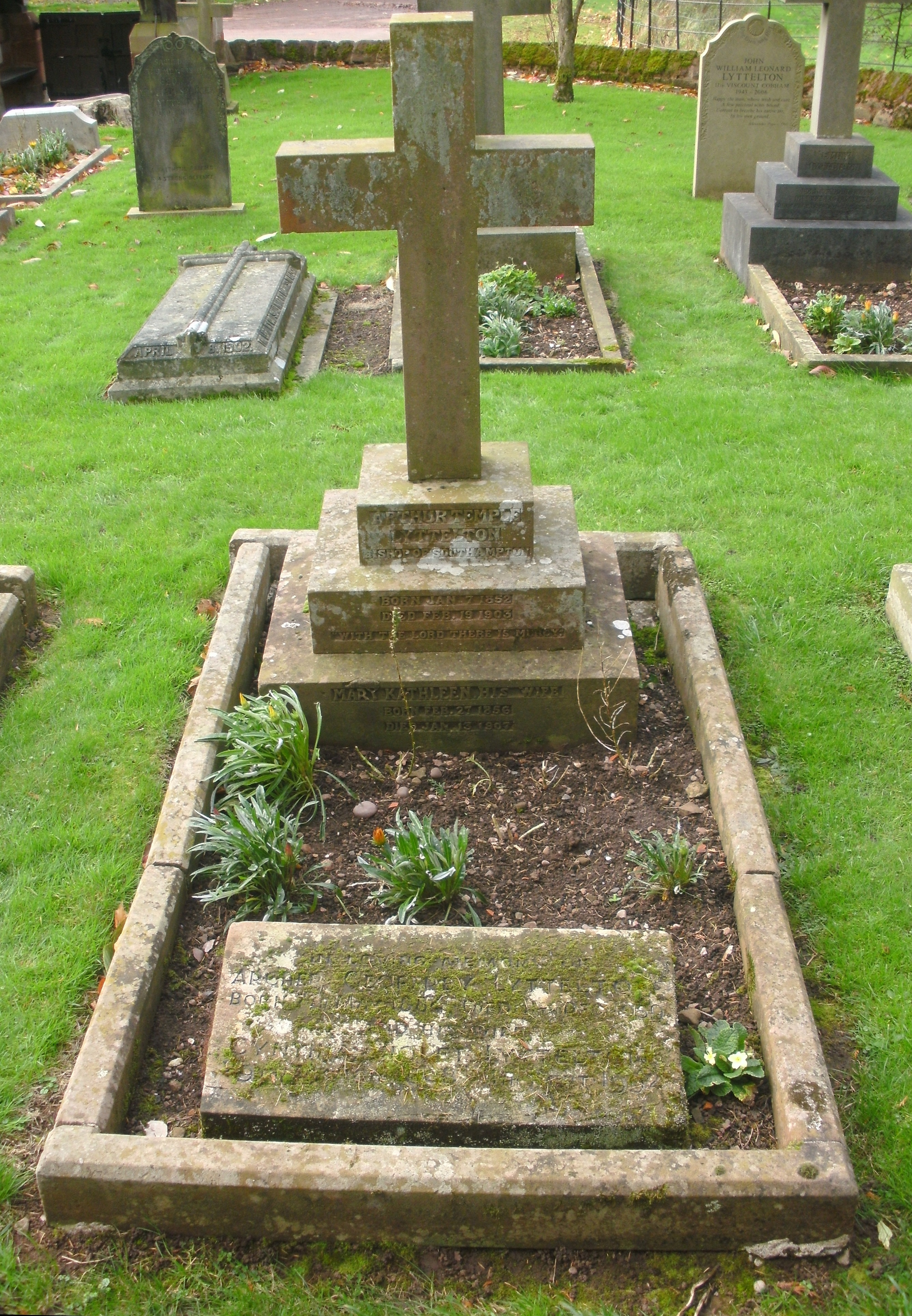
Lyttelton's grave at St John the Baptist Church, Hagley

Lyttelton died at his home in Petersfield, Hampshire on 19 February 1903. His body was transferred to Hagley, where it was interred later the same month.

== Publications ==
- The Place of Miracles in Religion (1899)

Church of England titles
Preceded by George Carnac Fisher	Bishop of Southampton; 1898–1903	Succeeded by James Macarthur
Academic offices
Preceded by New position	Master of Selwyn College, Cambridge; 1882–1893	Succeeded by John Selwyn
