= Ellen Wordsworth Darwin =

British academic (1856–1903)

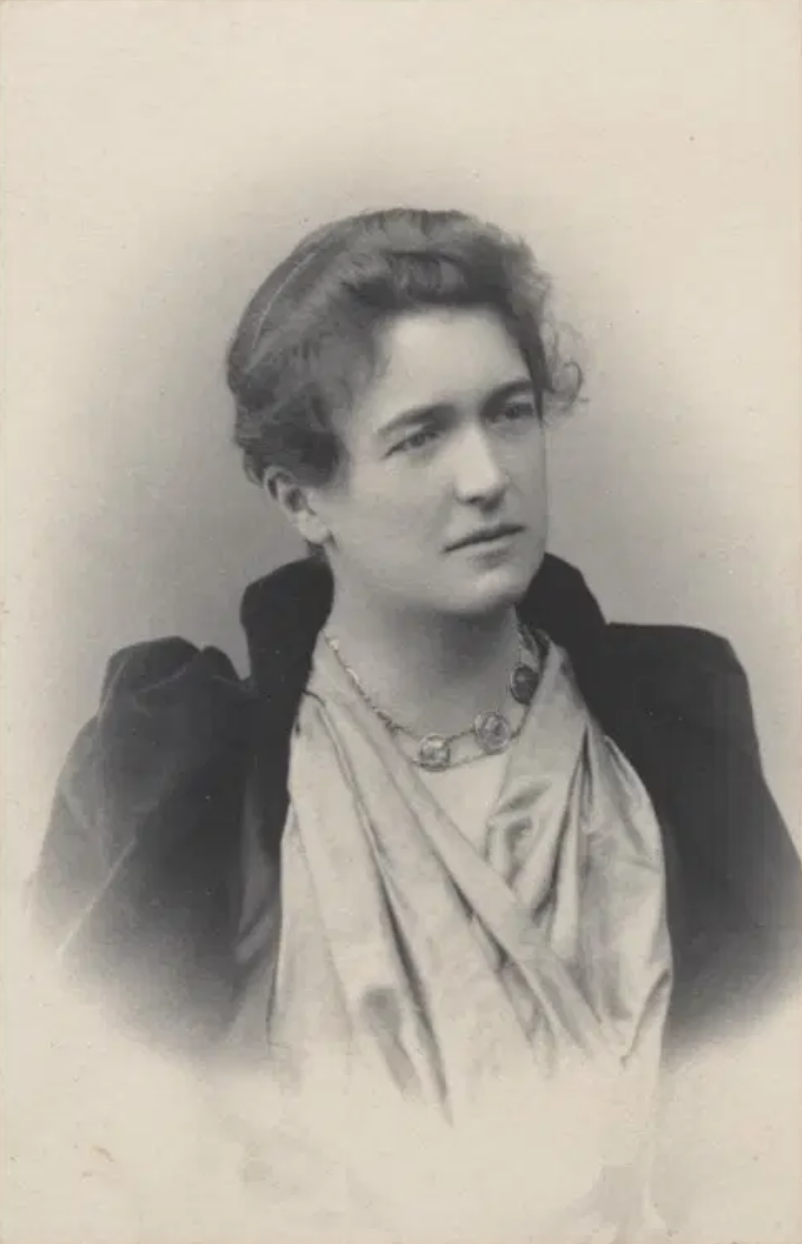
- Ellen Wordsworth Darwin in 1903
- Born: Ellen Wordsworth Crofts; 13 January 1856; Leeds, England
- Died: 28 August 1903 (aged 47)
- Occupations: Academic, lecturer
- Spouse: Francis Darwin (m. 1883)
- Children: Frances Cornford

Ellen Wordsworth Darwin (née Crofts; 13 January 1856 – 28 August 1903) was a British academic, a fellow and a lecturer in English Literature at Newnham College in Cambridge (1879–1883). She was also a member of the private and scholarly Ladies Dining Society in Cambridge and the second wife of the botanist Sir Francis Darwin, son of Charles Darwin. Their daughter was the poet Frances Cornford.

== Family and early life ==
Born Ellen Wordsworth Crofts in Leeds, the daughter of Ellen née Wordsworth, the daughter of a Leeds industrialist, and John Crofts, a magistrate and worsted and woollen manufacturer, she was a cousin of the utilitarian philosopher and economist Henry Sidgwick. Her older brother was Ernest Crofts RA, a painter of historical and military scenes.

== Later life ==
A student at Newnham College, Cambridge between 1874 and 1877, she returned there to teach English literature from 1878. A close friend from her Newnham days was the British classical scholar and linguist Jane Ellen Harrison. Following her marriage in 1883 to Charles Darwin's son, botanist Francis Darwin, she had to relinquish her academic post. Francis already had a son from his first marriage. Bernard Darwin had been brought up by his grandparents Emma and Charles Darwin (and by Emma alone after the death of Charles in 1882).

Bernard went to live with the newly married couple. In his autobiography he wrote that his stepmother "was always kind as could be in reading with me and playing with me, but there was always some feeling of reserve: perhaps she tried too hard to be a good stepmother and never to outstep those limits." Ellen suffered a miscarriage in 1884, giving birth to her surviving daughter Frances in 1886.

In the summer of 1888, Ellen Darwin wrote to her sister-in-law, Ida, to say that her friend Amy Levy was intending to pay a visit, confiding: "She has written a novel, in which the heroine is partly me. I have not read it yet, but I don’t expect much: her stories and novels are rather saddening." Levy's second novel Reuben Sachs: A Sketch was published shortly afterwards and caused some controversy with its satirical description of a well-off Anglo-Jewish community and its depiction of the Victorian marriage market.

Ellen Darwin was a member of the Ladies Dining Society - a private women's dining and discussion club based at Cambridge University that had been founded in 1890 by the author Louise Creighton and the women's activist Kathleen Lyttelton. Its members, most of whom were married to Cambridge academics, were believers in women's education and were active in the campaign to grant women Cambridge degrees. Most were strong supporters of female suffrage. Ellen was strongly agnostic and took her discussions seriously, a friend observing "It was at once distracting and delightfully amusing to hear her say, as she not infrequently did, 'I know I’m right'".

== Death ==
She died in 1903, aged 47, and was buried in the churchyard of St Andrew's church in Girton, Cambridgeshire.
