= Mary Ward (suffragist) =

Cambridge-based Irish suffragist (1851–1933)

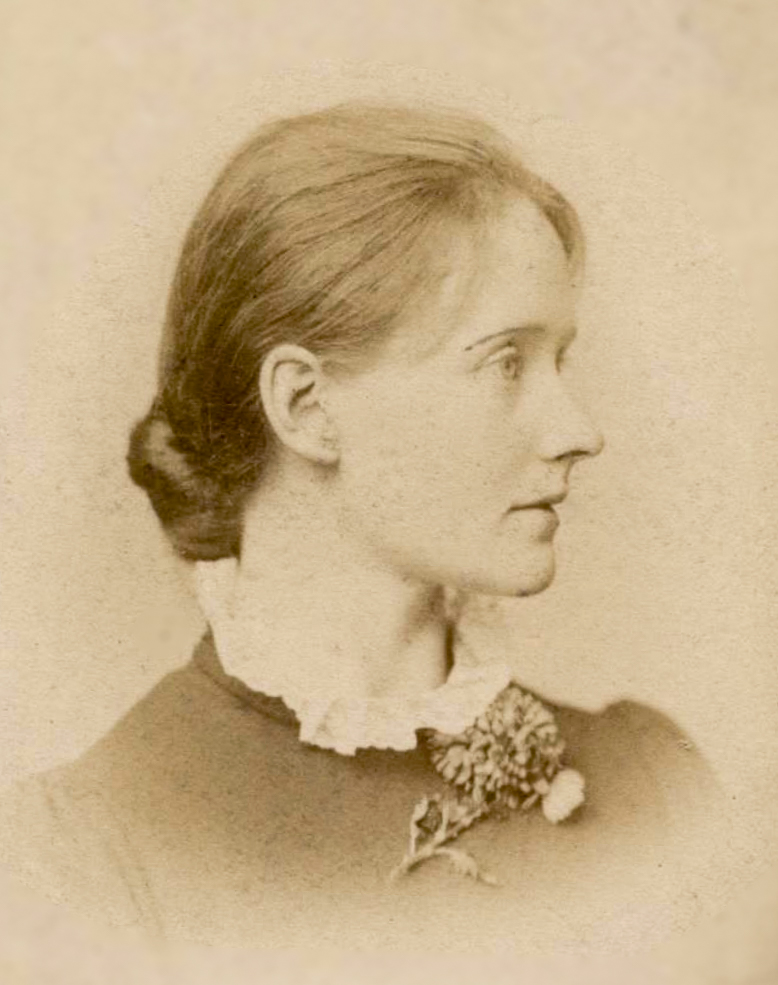
- Mary Martin (later Ward) in about 1875
- Born: Mary Jane Martin; 6 June 1851; Armagh, County Armagh, Ireland
- Died: 14 March 1933 (aged 81); Caldy, The Wirral, England
- Occupations: Suffragist, lecturer, writer
- Spouse: James Ward (m. 1884)
- Children: 3

Mary Jane Ward (née Martin; 6 June 1851 – 14 March 1933), known to her friends as "Minnie", was a Cambridge-based Irish suffragist, lecturer and writer. In spite of her lack of formal schooling, she was accepted to study at Newnham Hall (now Newnham College), Cambridge, in 1879 becoming the first woman to pass the moral sciences tripos examination with first class honours. She lectured at the college, and remained associated with it for many years.

She was a strong campaigner for women's access to university education on equal terms to men, and for women's suffrage generally, and was an active member of the Ladies Dining Society, a select group of Cambridge women of similar views. From 1905 she acted as honorary secretary for the Cambridge branch of the National Union of Women's Suffrage Societies and its successor the National Union of Societies for Equal Citizenship. Her 1908 play Man and Woman became a popular fundraiser with local suffrage societies.

Her husband was James Ward, Cambridge Professor of Mental Philosophy and Logic.

== Early life ==
Mary Martin, the third of twelve children of a Congregationalist minister, was born in Armagh, Ireland (then part of the United Kingdom of Great Britain and Ireland), on 6 June 1851. She was educated at home by her mother, there being little money for a girl's schooling since her mother's family wealth had been entailed to the male heirs.

When she was fifteen the family moved to Royston in Hertfordshire, and Mary became a pupil-teacher for a year at a school in Hampstead, after which she continued to educate herself while working as a governess.

In the mid-1870s her older brother the Cambridge physiologist Henry Newell Martin offered to support her studies at Cambridge if she could win a scholarship in the Higher Local Examination, which she did. In 1876, as Newell moved to take up the first chair of physiology at Johns Hopkins University, Mary began her studies at the newly-founded Newnham Hall (later Newnham College). At age 25 ‘Minnie’, as she was known to her friends, was described as looking young for her age, delicately pretty, gay, eager and shy.

== Cambridge ==
As a Cambridge student, Martin involved herself in issues of female education, campaigning for women to have access to university education on equal terms to men, and to be admitted as of right to the university's tripos examinations. In 1879 she took her final examinations in the moral sciences tripos, passing with first class honours, the first woman ever to do so. From 1880 she became resident lecturer in moral sciences at Newnham College.

During the early 1880s, Martin attended a series of lectures given by James Ward, a fellow of Trinity College (later to become Professor of Mental Philosophy and Logic) who was also a strong supporter of women's education. Mary and James married in Nottingham on 31 July 1884 and they settled in Cambridge, in a house built for them by JJ Stevenson. They went on to have two daughters and a son.

It was said of Mary Ward (as she then became) that her "quick Irish speech bubbled out when she was excited. Life was full of the urge of things to fight for". She was an enthusiast for the equality of the sexes, devoting much time to her work for the suffrage movement. She had clear-cut opinions on many subjects, which she could express trenchantly, especially on the suffering of human and animal life.

From 1890 until its dissolution in 1914 she was a member of the Ladies Dining Society, an exclusive women's activist discussion group that had been established by Kathleen Lyttelton and Louise Creighton, both of whom were also wives of Cambridge academics. She continued her association with Newnham College after her marriage, becoming a member of the college council from 1890. She also contributed political sketches to Punch and short articles on metaphysics to the philosophy journal Mind.

In 1905 Ward became Honorary Secretary of the Cambridge Women's Suffrage Association (CWSA) – an affiliate organisation to the National Union of Women's Suffrage Societies (NUWSS) – a role she held until 1915. By 1909 meetings were being held at her home.

In April 1908 her two-act play Man and Woman was performed in a hall in Shepherd's Bush, London, the suffrage newspaper Votes for Women noting that it was "sometimes quite lively and amusing". Ward had the play printed in 1911, and supplied copies to suffragist societies on a sale or return basis, with royalties and profits going to the suffragist cause. It became popular over the next few years, a single 1911 performance making a profit of £10 for an organisation that Ward helped to found: the Eastern Counties Federation of the NUWSS. The play featured an idealistic protagonist, Helen Chester, who persuades a doubting woman that voting is worthwhile.

Ward disagreed with the violent tactics that were being introduced by the suffragettes, and in May 1913 she co-signed a letter with Margaret Heitland protesting against the continuing emphasis in the popular press on the militant actions of the Women's Social and Political Union (WSPU), noting that the Union "has always condemned every form of violence". She also disapproved of the way in which the government was treating militant female prisoners, and she resigned her membership of the Liberal Party in protest. In 1913 she joined the NUWSS Great Pilgrimage, leading a Cambridge group on the march to London.

Ward ran a soup kitchen in Cambridge during the Great War. Noting the large number of unemployed Belgian refugees, she devised, ran, and raised funds for a project known as the "Belgian Soldiers' Comfort Fund" whereby Belgian refugee women would make garments for the troops. It was reported that some 6500 garments were despatched from her own house, each of them bearing a woven tape to say it was a gift from England made by Belgian refugee women.

In 1918 Ward became honorary secretary to the Cambridge branch of the National Union of Societies for Equal Citizenship, the successor to the NUWSS, a position she held until 1923.

== Move to The Wirral ==
After the death of her husband in 1925, Ward left Cambridge and moved to live with her daughter in Caldy on The Wirral, England. There she wrote Memories of Kenneth Martin Ward to commemorate her son, professor of physics at University College, Rangoon, who had died in 1927 aged 39.

== Death ==
Ward died on 14 March 1933 at her daughter's home in Caldy, aged 81.

== Select publications ==
- "On the birth of Olwen" (poem, 1890). Published in To Sing Out Sometimes: Poems of a Family (1982) (M Ward, AY Campbell, et al.)
- Man and Woman: The Question of the Day (play, 1908, printed 1911)
- Memories of Kenneth Martin Ward

== Bibliography ==
- Kennedy Smith, Ann (9 May 2018a). "The Ladies Dining Society". ODNB. doi:10.1093/odnb/9780198614128.013.109658. ISBN 978-0-19-861412-8.
- Kennedy Smith, Ann (9 August 2018b). "Ward [née Martin], Mary Jane". ODNB. doi:10.1093/odnb/9780198614128.013.111289.
