= Kathleen Lyttelton =

British women's activist (1856–1907)

- Lyttelton in about 1898.
- Born: Mary Kathleen Clive; 27 February 1856; Belgravia, London, England
- Died: 12 January 1907 (aged 50); Perrystone Court, Herefordshire, England
- Occupations: Women's activist, editor and writer
- Spouse: Arthur Lyttelton (m. 1880)
- Children: 3
- Father: George Clive

Mary Kathleen Lyttelton (née Clive; 27 February 1856 – 12 January 1907) was a British activist, editor and writer. She devoted much of her life to fighting for women's suffrage and for the improvement of women's lives in general.

After a period of 11 years in Cambridge, as wife of Selwyn College's first Master Arthur Lyttelton, she concentrated on her writing and women's committee work. In her 1901 book Women and Their Work she argued that education for women was "essential to their true progress", with the franchise being a necessary part of that education.

== Early life ==
Mary Kathleen Clive was born on 27 February 1856 in Belgravia, London. Her father was the judge and Liberal politician George Clive, her mother Ann Sybella Martha Farquhar.

In spite of the initial misgivings of her father, in 1880 she married the Hon Arthur Lyttelton, then a tutor at Keble College, Oxford. Fortunately the marriage proved strong and the couple went on to have three children: Margaret Lucy (1882), Archer Geoffrey (1884), and Stephen Clive (1887).

== Cambridge ==
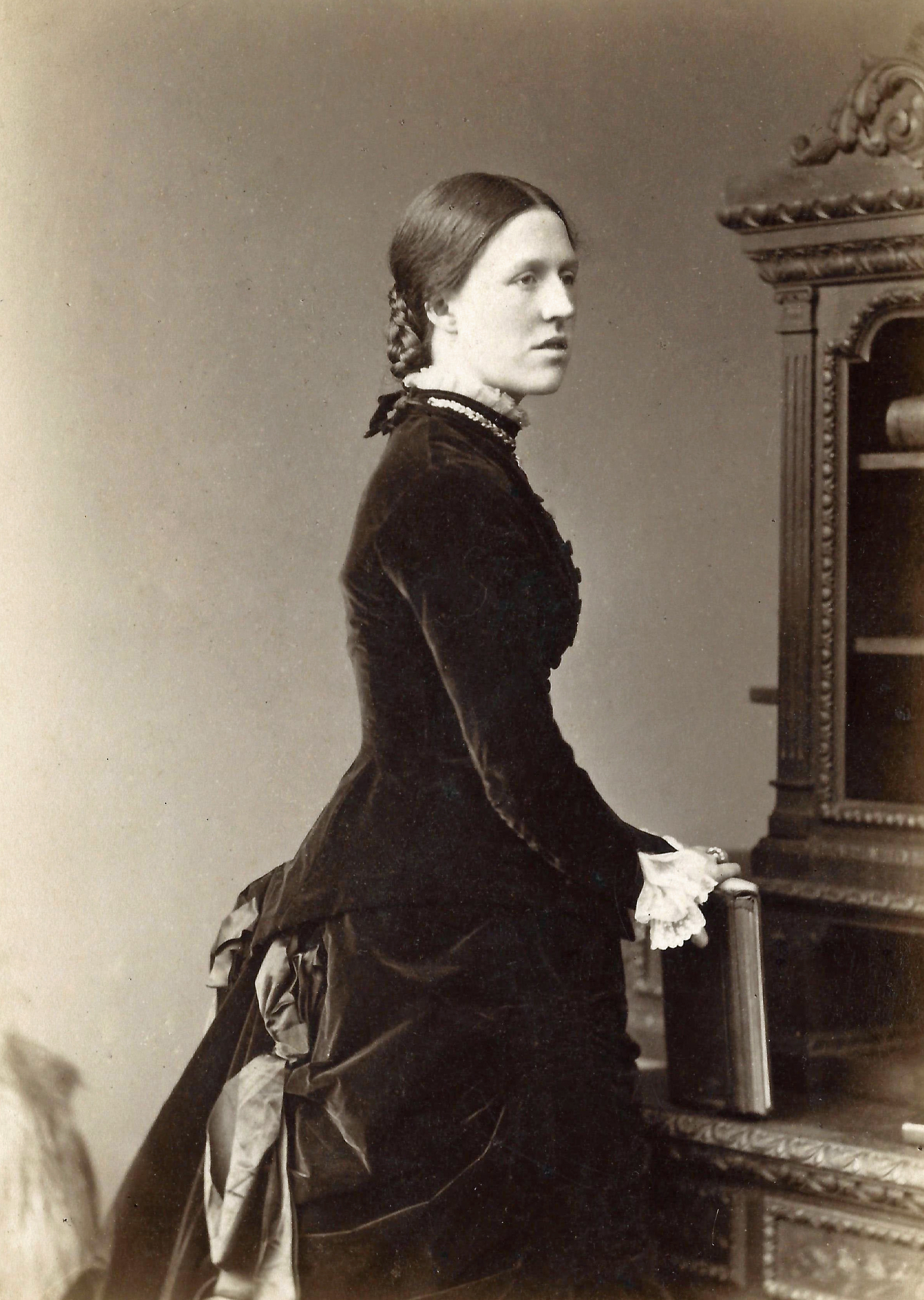
Shortly after her marriage in 1880

In 1882, Kathleen, Arthur and their newborn daughter Margaret took up residence in the newly founded Selwyn College, Cambridge, where Arthur had been appointed Master-designate. When they moved in, the college was still a building site with only the West front completed. Initially, they made do with a suite of adapted student rooms until the Master's Lodge was built. Living with them at the time was Arthur's older sister Lucy Cavendish who had few months earlier been widowed when her husband, Lord Frederick Cavendish, Chief Secretary for Ireland, was fatally stabbed during the Phoenix Park Murders in Dublin.

Kathleen founded The Cambridge Association For Women's Suffrage (CAWS) along with Millicent Fawcett in 1884, and Fawcett encouraged her to join the Executive of The Central Society For Women's Suffrage. She was also active with the Cambridge Women's Refuge, helping to raise funds for what would become the Cambridge Association for the Care of Girls which aimed to provide poor local girls with practical help with domestic economy and literacy.

In 1890, with her close friend Louise Creighton, Kathleen founded the Cambridge Ladies Dining Society, a group of believers in women's education who actively campaigned for the university to grant degrees to women; most were also strong supporters of female suffrage. Members of the society included Caroline Jebb, Eleanor Sidgwick and Mary Paley Marshall.

During their years at Selwyn, the Lytteltons also helped develop the College Music Society, and they supported the Boat Club (whose colours were chosen by Kathleen).

== Lancashire ==
The family left Cambridge in 1893 after 11 years at Selwyn, and Arthur took up the post of vicar of Eccles Parish Church in Lancashire. In 1895, along with Arthur, Kathleen founded and later became chair of the executive committee of the Manchester and Salford Women's Trade Union Council, an organisation whose aim was to investigate working conditions and organise low-paid workers into unions. Members of the council included Christabel Pankhurst and CP Scott.

She launched the Eccles branch of the Cooperative Women's Guild, and became a vice president of the National Union of Women Workers, as well as joining the committee of the Manchester National Society for Women's Suffrage. As an active Poor Law Guardian, she complained that Manchester city officials "winked at the pollution of the atmosphere".

Kathleen's course of lectures for the Manchester School of Domestic Economy entitled Common Sense For Housewives: Girls’ Life after Leaving School was published by the school in 1896.

== Hampshire ==
After Arthur was appointed Suffragan Bishop of Southampton in 1898 the family moved back south, to Petersfield, Hampshire.

Kathleen was elected president of the National Union of Women's Workers in 1900 and again in 1901.

Kathleen's book Women and Their Work, published in 1901, was permeated with her deep religious beliefs. In it, she insisted on the importance of education for women and the necessity of commitment and conviction; she argued that while the difficult lives of working-class women would naturally lead to the formation of definite opinions, the sheltered, easy lives of middle and upper-class women did not naturally lead to such conviction. She wrote that "the withholding of the franchise is very prejudicial to the right development of women, and that the education given by the vote is essential to their true progress", foreseeing that “the bewilderment will pass as the years go on, and the very magnitude of the task will in time arise and awaken those women who are as yet indifferent to it".

Following Arthur's death in February 1903, Kathleen edited a collection of his essays entitled Modern Poets of Faith, Doubt and Paganism (1904).

== London ==
In June 1903 she became editor of the women's section of an Anglican weekly publication called The Guardian, in which role she was the first to review and publish the early writings of Virginia Stephen (later Virginia Woolf). Virginia was initially hesitant and grateful, but by late 1905 had become sufficiently confident to complain that Mrs L "sticks her broad thumb into the middle of my sentences and improves the moral tone".

Kathleen moved to a house in Gower Street, London, near that of Millicent Fawcett with whom she published Why Women Want the Vote in 1906.

== Death ==
Kathleen died at the age of 50 on 12 January 1907, at the Clives’ family seat at Perrystone Court, Herefordshire. Her obituary in The Times made no mention of her suffrage and TUC work, and concentrated on her role as a scholarly translator, "a considerable student of literature" and a "diligent critic”. There were also obituaries in The Englishwoman's Review, 1907–1908 and The Guardian.

== Select publications ==
- 1886: Translator of Nature and the Bible: Lectures on the Mosaic history of Creation in its relation to Natural Science by Franz Heinrich Reusch.
- 1892: Lord Wastwater, a novel published under the pseudonym Sidney Bolton (the name of Lyttelton's great-grandmother).
- 1893: Legends Revived. A Modern Tannhäuser. The Bridge.
- 1896: Common Sense for Housewives. A course of lectures ... Girls' Life after leaving school.
- 1901: Women and their Work.
- 1904: Preface to Modern Poets of Faith Doubt & Paganism, and other essays by her husband Arthur Lyttelton.
- 1907: Editor of, and introduction to, The Spiritual Guide which disentangles the Soul, by Miguel Molinos.

== Bibliography ==
- Kelly, Serena (23 September 2004). "Lyttelton [née Clive], Mary Kathleen (1856–1907)". Oxford Dictionary of National Biography (online ed.). Oxford University Press. doi:10.1093/ref:odnb/50712. (Subscription, Wikipedia Library access or UK public library membership required.)
- Chothia, Jean (2018). "Feature Articles by Fellows: Kathleen Lyttelton (1856-1907)". Selwyn College Calendar, vol 125, 2017-2018. Selwyn College Cambridge. pp. 60–62.
