= Lauder Burghs (Commonwealth Parliament constituency) =

Constituency of the Protectorate, 1654 to 1659

- Former constituency for the Protectorate Parliament
- Region: Scotland

Former constituency
- Created: 1654
- Abolished: 1659
- Created from: Scotland
- Replaced by: Peebles, Selkirk, Jedburgh, Lauder, North Berwick, Dunbar, Haddington

Lauder Burghs was a constituency in the House of Commons which existed during the Commonwealth of England, Scotland and Ireland (also known as the Protectorate) from 1654 until 1659. Elections were held at Lauder.

== List of Members of Parliament ==
- Sir Thomas Clarges (1659 – 1660)
