= Sir John Hamilton-Dalrymple, 5th Baronet =

Scottish politician

Sir John Hamilton-Dalrymple, 5th Baronet (2 December 1780 – 26 May 1835) was a Scottish politician and the MP for Haddington Burghs between 1805 and 1806. He was the second son of Sir Hew Dalrymple, 3rd Baronet, and the younger brother of Sir Hew Dalrymple-Hamilton, 4th Baronet.

An army officer, he served as a cornet in the 28th Light Dragoons in 1795, rising through the ranks of lieutenant in 1797, captain in 1800 and then going on to half-pay in 1802 during the Peace of Amiens. He became captain-commandant of the North Berwick Volunteers in 1803, and then a captain in the 73rd Regiment of Foot on the resumption of the war with France. He changed regiments, joining the 42nd Regiment of Foot as a captain in 1803, and by 1805 was a major in the 64th Regiment of Foot. He became a lieutenant-colonel in the 10th Regiment of Foot later that year, and served with the 22 Regiment of Foot in 1806. He became a brevet colonel in 1813 and a major-general in 1819. He served for a time at Madras and inherited his brother's baronetcy on 23 February 1834. He had married Charlotte Warrender, the daughter of Sir Patrick Warrender, on 30 July 1806. They had two sons and five daughters. He was succeeded in the baronetcy by his son, Hew.

== Citations ==
Parliament of the United Kingdom
Preceded by Thomas Maitland	Member of Parliament for Haddington Burghs; 1805–1806	Succeeded by Henry Erskine
Baronetage of Nova Scotia
Preceded by Hew Dalrymple	Baronet (of Bargeny); 1834–1835	Succeeded by Hew Hamilton-Dalrymple
