= Eleanor Mildred Sidgwick =

British psychic researcher (1845–1936)

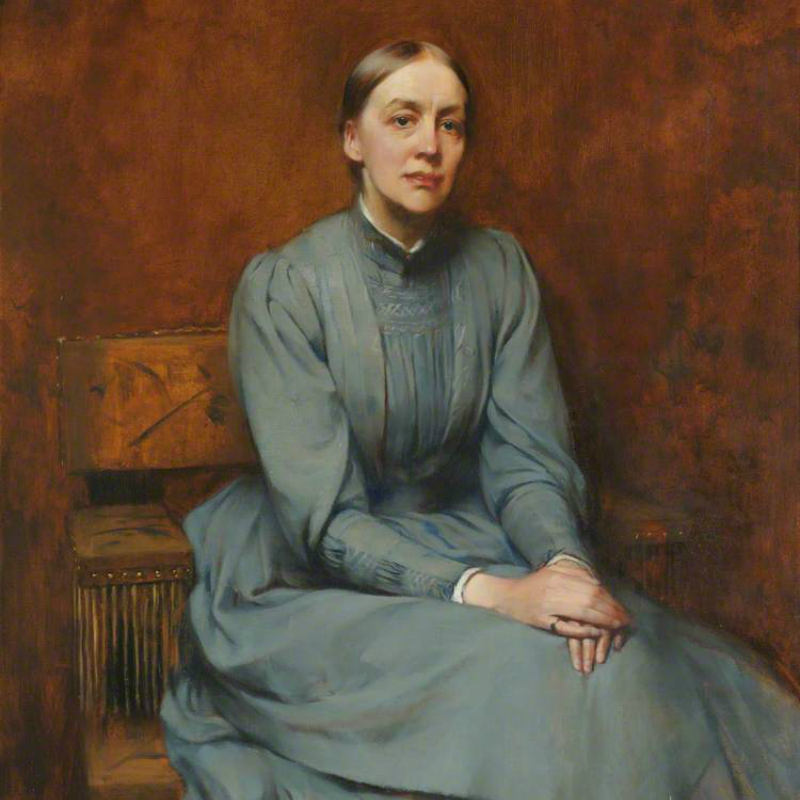
- Portrait of Eleanor Mildred Sidgwick painted by Sir James Jebusa Shannon, 1889
- Born: Eleanor Mildred Balfour; 11 March 1845; East Lothian
- Died: 10 February 1936 (aged 90); Funchal, Madeira
- Spouse: Henry Sidgwick (m. 1876; died 1900)
- Parent(s): James Maitland Balfour; Lady Blanche Gascoyne-Cecil

Eleanor Mildred Sidgwick (née Balfour; 11 March 1845 – 10 February 1936) was a physics researcher assisting Lord Rayleigh, an activist for the higher education of women, Principal of Newnham College of the University of Cambridge, and a leading figure in the Society for Psychical Research.

== Biography ==
Eleanor Mildred Balfour was born in East Lothian, daughter of James Maitland Balfour and Lady Blanche Harriet. She was born into perhaps the most prominent political clan in 19th-century Britain, the 'Hotel Cecil': her brother Arthur would eventually himself become prime minister. Her sister was biologist Alice Blanche Balfour. Another brother, Frank, also a biologist, died young in a climbing accident.

One of the first students at Newnham College in Cambridge, in 1876 she married (and became converted to feminism by) the philosopher Henry Sidgwick. In 1880 she became Vice-Principal of Newnham under the founding Principal Anne Clough, succeeding as principal on Clough's death in 1892. In 1890 Sidgwick was elected to the Ladies Dining Society that had been founded by Louise Creighton and Kathleen Lyttleton. Other members included the economist Mary Paley Marshall, the classicist Margaret Verrall, the Irish-born suffragist Mary Ward, former Newnham lecturer Ellen Wordsworth Darwin, the mental health campaigner Ida Darwin, Baroness Eliza von Hügel and the U.S. socialites Caroline Jebb and Maud Darwin.

Eleanor and her husband resided at Newnham until 1900, the year of Henry Sidgwick's death. In 1894 Sidgwick was one of the first three women to serve on a royal commission, the Bryce Commission on Secondary Education which was established by James Bryce.

As a young woman, Eleanor had helped Rayleigh improve the accuracy of experimental measurement of electrical resistance; she subsequently turned her careful experimental mind to the question of testing the veracity of claims for psychical phenomena. She was elected President of the Society for Psychical Research in 1908 and named President of Honour in 1932.

In 1916 Sidgwick left Cambridge to live with one of her brothers near Woking, where she remained until her death in 1936.

She was awarded honorary degrees by the universities of Manchester, Edinburgh, St Andrews and Birmingham.

=== Psychical research writings ===
Most of her writings related to psychical research, and are contained in the Proceedings of the Society for Psychical Research. However, some related to educational matters, and a couple of essays dealt with the morality of international affairs.

Sidgwick was highly critical of physical mediumship. In 1886 and 1887 a series of publications by S. J. Davey, Richard Hodgson and Sidgwick in the Journal for the Society for Psychical Research exposed the slate writing tricks of the medium William Eglinton. Sidgwick regarded Eglinton to be nothing more than a clever conjurer. Due to the critical papers, Stainton Moses and other prominent spiritualist members resigned from the Society for Psychical Research.

In 1891, Alfred Russel Wallace requested for the Society to properly investigate spirit photography. Wallace had endorsed various spirit photographs as genuine. Sidgwick responded with her paper On Spirit Photographs (1891) which cast doubt on the subject and revealed the fraudulent methods that spirit photographers such as Édouard Isidore Buguet, Frederic Hudson and William H. Mumler had utilized.

== Selected publications ==
- Sidgwick, Eleanor. (1886). Mr. Eglinton. Journal of the Society for Psychical Research 2: 282–334.
- Sidgwick, Eleanor. (1886–87) Results of a Personal Investigation into the 'Physical Phenomena' of Spiritualism. With Some Critical Remarks on the Evidence for the Genuineness of Such Phenomena. Proceedings of the Society for Psychical Research 4: 45–74.
- Sidgwick, Eleanor. (1891). On Spirit Photographs: A Reply to Mr A.R. Wallace. Proceedings of the Society for Psychical Research 7: 268–289.
- Sidgwick, Eleanor. (1915). A Contribution to the Study of the Psychology of Mrs. Piper's Trance Phenomena. Proceedings of the Society for Psychical Research 28: 1–657.
- Sidgwick, Eleanor. (1917–18). Review: The Reality of Psychic Phenomena by W. J. Crawford. Journal of the Society for Psychical Research: 18: 29–31.
- Sidgwick, Eleanor. (1922). Phantasms of the Living: An Examination and Analysis of Cases of Telepathy between Living Persons Printed in the "Journal" of the Society for Psychical Research since the Publication of the Book "Phantasms of the Living," by Gurney, Myers and Podmore in 1886. Proceedings of the Society for Psychical Research 33: 23-429.

Academic offices
Preceded by Anne Clough	Principal of Newnham College, Cambridge; 1892–1910	Succeeded by Katharine Stephen
