= Gerald Balfour =

Gerald Balfour may refer to:

- Gerald Balfour, 2nd Earl of Balfour (1853–1945), British Conservative politician
- Gerald Balfour, 4th Earl of Balfour (1925–2003), Scottish peer
