= Elizabeth Balfour =

Elizabeth Balfour may refer to:

- Elizabeth Balfour, Countess of Balfour (1867–1942), English politician, suffragette, and peeress
- Elizabeth Balfour (midwife) (1832–1918), Scottish midwife

== See also ==
- Betty Balfour (1903–1977), English actress
