= Hew Dalrymple =

Hew Dalrymple may refer to:

- Hew Dalrymple, Lord North Berwick (1652–1737), Scottish judge and politician
- Sir Hew Dalrymple, 2nd Baronet (1712–1790), Scottish politician, grandson of the above
- Hew Dalrymple (advocate) (c. 1740–1774), Scottish advocate, poet and Attorney-General of Grenada
- Sir Hew Dalrymple, 3rd Baronet (1746–1800), Scottish politician, son of the 2nd Baronet
- Hew Whitefoord Dalrymple (1750–1830), British Army general
- Hew Hamilton Dalrymple (1857–1945), Scottish politician
