= Lady Kinvara Balfour =

English creative director and public speaker

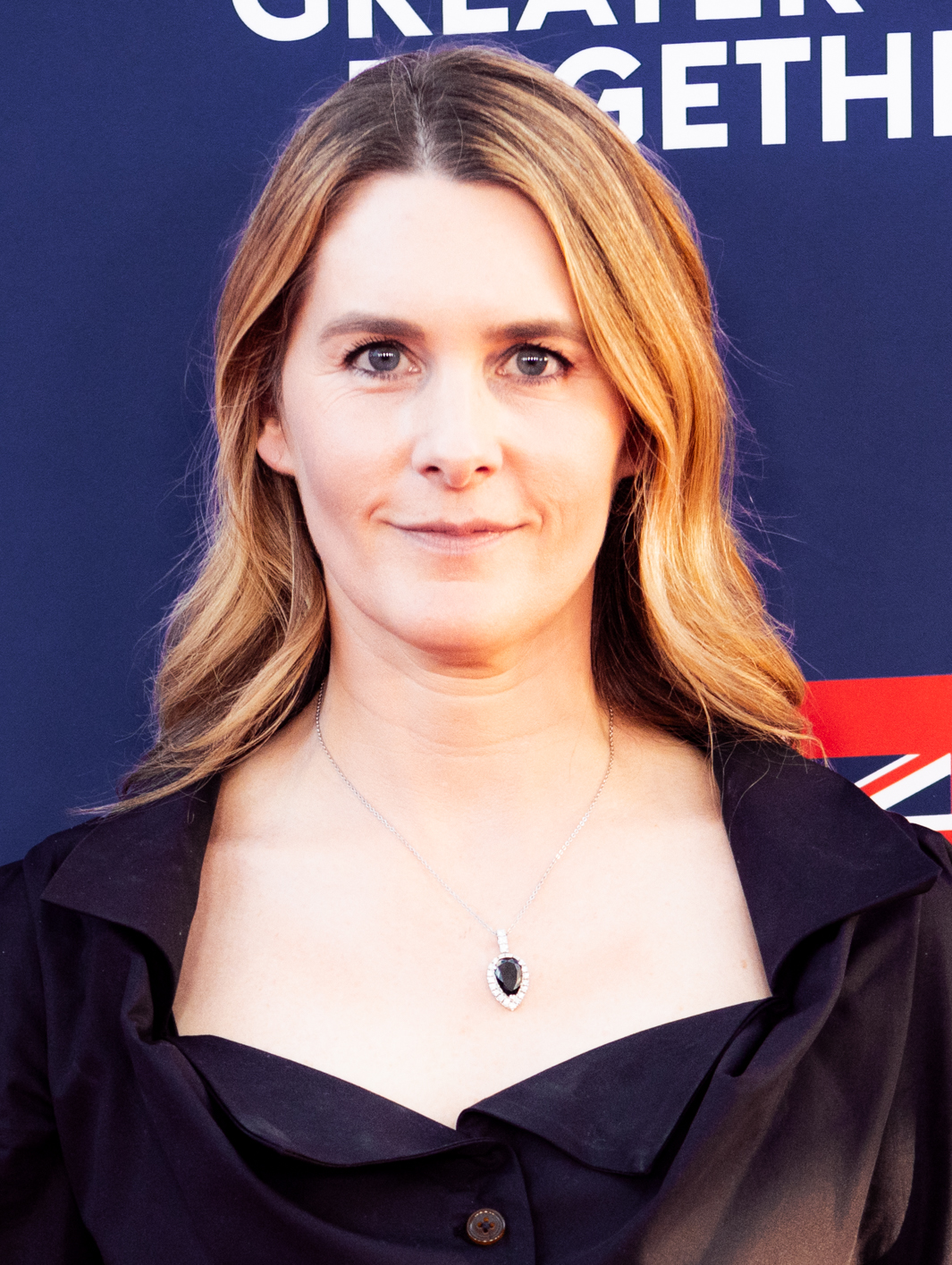
- Balfour in 2026
- Born: 30 June 1975 (age 51); Queen Mary's Hospital, Roehampton, London
- Education: BA in English, French & Film
- Alma mater: St Mary's School, Ascot; Newcastle University; Central School of Speech and Drama
- Occupations: Creative director, producer, writer, host, public speaker
- Spouse: Count Riccardo Lanza (m. 2009; div. 2011)
- Partner: Sudhin Shahani
- Children: 1
- Parents: Roderick Balfour, 5th Earl of Balfour; Lady Tessa Fitzalan-Howard
- Relatives: Sir David Frost (uncle); Lady Marcia Fitzalan-Howard (aunt)
- Website: www.kinvara-balfour.com

Lady Kinvara Clare Rachel Balfour (born 30 June 1975) is an English creative director, producer, writer, and public speaker. She is the second daughter of the 5th Earl of Balfour and Lady Tessa Fitzalan-Howard. Balfour is a niece of the 18th Duke of Norfolk.

== Background ==
=== Ancestry ===
Balfour's father is the 5th Earl of Balfour (descended from Eustace Balfour, brother of the British cabinet minister Gerard, 2nd Earl of Balfour, and brother of the British Prime Minister Arthur Balfour, 1st Earl of Balfour). Her mother, Tessa, Countess of Balfour, is the eldest daughter of the late 17th Duke of Norfolk and his wife, the Dowager Duchess of Norfolk (formerly Anne Constable-Maxwell). The titles of Duke of Norfolk, Earl of Arundel and Earl Marshal of England are the oldest and premier British aristocratic titles after the Royal Family. The Norfolks are direct descendants of King Edward I and they are also the leading Roman Catholic family in Britain. The family seat is Arundel Castle in West Sussex and Carlton Towers in Yorkshire.

Balfour is a niece of British broadcaster and TV presenter Sir David Frost and also a niece of television and stage actress Marsha Fitzalan.

=== Education ===
Balfour attended Lady Eden's School in London, followed by St. Mary's Convent School, Ascot, followed by a degree in English, French and Film at Newcastle University. She completed her post-graduate education at Central School of Speech and Drama.

== Career ==
=== As playwright ===
Balfour's first play Dazed & Abused premiered at the Edinburgh Festival Fringe in 2004. It later transferred to London and New York where Diane von Fürstenberg made her studio theatre available for the production. In 2008, Kinvara attended the Royal Court Theatre's Creative Writers Programme after which she wrote her second play, After Invisible.

Balfour has also acted in the short films Cashback and Away We Stay. In 2013, she performed in an immersive theatre show You Me Bum Bum Train.

Balfour is an ambassador for London's Royal Court Theatre.

=== As editor and writer ===
At 17, Balfour won the Lloyd's Fashion Challenge, a competition in fashion design, out of 30,000 entries nationwide, as judged by Vivienne Westwood. Balfour went on to assist Westwood in her design studio. Balfour then joined British couturier Tomasz Starzewski, whose clients included Diana, Princess of Wales and Sarah, Duchess of York. She has also worked for Norman Hartnell, a British couture house.

In 2004, Balfour was appointed London Editor for US website DailyCandy.com by owner, entrepreneur Robert Pittman. In 2008, DailyCandy.com was acquired by US media giant Comcast for a reported $125million. In 2012, Balfour launched a digital blog platform for Time Out under new ownership by Peter Dubens. In January 2014, Balfour became Founding Partner of new tech start-up StyleCard, a fashion and lifestyle website.

=== As host and public speaker ===
Balfour speaks at events and conferences about fashion and popular culture.

As of February 2014, Balfour hosts Fashion in Conversation for Apple, a series of interviews in the UK and US with people working in fashion, such as Vogue editor-in-chief Anna Wintour, blogger Scott Schuman aka The Sartorialist, fashion designers Zac Posen, Marchesa, Proenza Schouler, Mary Katrantzou, Anya Hindmarch, Manolo Blahnik, "Queen of the Green Carpet" Livia Firth and Academy Award winning costume designer Sandy Powell among others. On 7 April 2014, designer Tom Ford announced his marriage to Richard Buckley during a Fashion in Conversation interview with Balfour.

In September 2014, Balfour acted as guest host for The AOL BUILD Speaker Series in New York, interviewing fashion designer Zac Posen, Dao-Yi Chow and Maxwell Osborne of Public School, and Jens Grede, co-founder of Industrie Magazine, Saturday Group and FRAME Denim.

Balfour has lectured at London's Victoria & Albert Museum.

=== As producer ===
Balfour was executive producer on McQueen (2018), a documentary film about the late British designer Alexander McQueen.

== Personal life ==
In 2009, Balfour married Italian count Riccardo Lanza at Arundel Castle, West Sussex. They divorced in 2011. Balfour and her partner, Surf Air co-founder Sudhin Shahani, have a son born in October 2018.
