= The Victoria League for Commonwealth Friendship =

The Victoria League for Commonwealth Friendship (1901–present) is a voluntary charitable organisation that connects people from Commonwealth countries. There are currently branches in the UK, Australia, and New Zealand with affiliated organisations in Canada and the USA. It is headquartered in Bayswater, London, United Kingdom.

The Victoria League in the UK presently has around 100 members in Britain as of 2020 and around 10 overseas Leagues. Queen Elizabeth II served as the organisation's patron. It is one of more than 80 non-governmental organisations (NGOs) that promote cooperation and peace within the Commonwealth of Nations. Overseas branches are autonomous, operating within their own countries regulations; however, they all share the same history of birth.

== History ==
The organisation was established in 1901 and named after the late Queen Victoria who had died on 22 January the same year. It was envisioned as an independent, non-political organisation to promote "a closer union between the different parts of what is now the Commonwealth of Nations, by the interchange of information and hospitality and by cooperation in any practical scheme tending to foster friendly understanding and good fellowship." The objectives were defined as hospitality, friendship, and education. Membership to the Victoria League was open to both men and women but the first Committee was composed solely of women who framed a Constitution and enrolled the first General Council.

The first executives appointed to the league were Winifred, Countess of Dundonald and Agnes Macdonald, 1st Baroness Macdonald of Earnscliffe. A notable General Secretary of the league was Gertrude Drayton, CBE, who held the position from 1916 until her death by enemy action in April 1941.

Perhaps the League's first act was the establishment of a fund in 1901 to help the displaced Afrikaner families during the Boer War. Other projects including help in tending war graves, fundraising for alleviating distress especially during the World Wars. During World War I, the League focused on hospitality for Commonwealth servicemen. Clubs and hostels were opened in London and Edinburgh and 282,000 beds provided for servicemen on leave. The League became a receiving centre for overseas gifts for distribution to soldiers and relief organisations. In World War II, it provided Commonwealth servicemen in the United Kingdom with 1.25 million beds and 4 million meals. As part of its work in education, it organised cross country essay competitions, set up libraries, and supplied English books and magazines across Commonwealth countries.

The Victoria League has been involved with student hospitality and welfare since 1927 and the present Hostel in Bayswater, London, was opened by Princess Alice, The League's president at the time, on 22 October 1953. Student House, where the Headquarters of The Victoria League is located, has become the focal point of The League's charitable activities.

Margaret Child Villiers, Countess of Jersey, was appointed as the organisation's first President and she retained this position for 26 years. In 1906, the future Queen Mary, then Princess of Wales, became the first Royal Patron of the Victoria League. The organisation has retained Royal Patronage ever since. Queen Elizabeth II had been the Patron of the Victoria League from 1953 until her death in 2022. Elizabeth's son Charles III accepted royal patronage of the Victoria League in May 2024.

== Notable members ==
Alice Blanche Balfour – Scottish entomologist, naturalist, scientific illustrator and a pioneering geneticist	Millicent Fawcett – English politician, writer and leader of the National Union of Women's Suffrage Societies (NUWSS)
Violet Milner, Viscountess Milner – English socialite and editor of the political monthly National Review	Sir Malcolm Sargent – English conductor, organist and composer
Noël Coward – English playwright, composer, director, actor and singer	Ivor Novello – Welsh composer, actor, and leading British entertainer

== Present day ==
The Victoria League maintains a diary of events for its members and occasions such as Trooping The Colour, The Queen's Birthday Parade, Commonwealth Day Observance, ANZAC Day are well supported by its members. In honour of the Queen's Golden Jubilee in 2012, the organisation financed the building of a secondary school in Sierra Leone. It has also funded the construction of two nursery buildings in Borneo. Since 2019, it is supporting an innovative school called the Umabano Academy which is based in Kigali, Rwanda and operated by A Partner in Education (APIE), a UK registered charity.

The focal point of the League's charitable activities is the Victoria League Student House, which provides subsidised accommodation to students from Commonwealth countries continues to be extremely popular. The Student House is located in Bayswater, London, United Kingdom.

== See also ==
- Ladies Empire Club
