= Marsha Fitzalan =

British actress

Lady Marsha Fitzalan
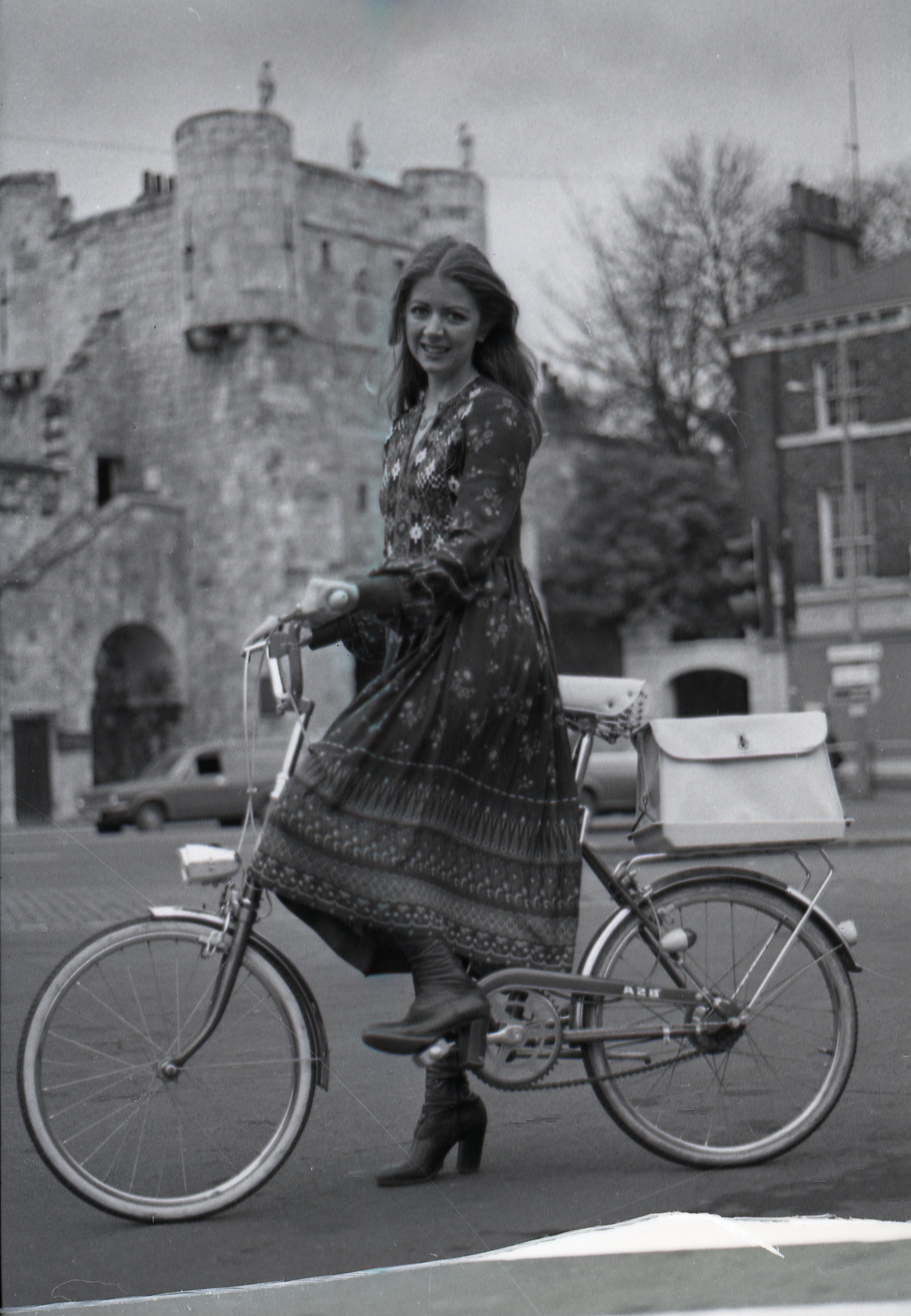
- Born: Marcia Mary Josephine Fitzalan Howard; 10 March 1953 (age 72); Bonn, West Germany
- Occupation: Actress
- Spouses: Patrick Ryecart (m. 1977; div. 1995) Nick George (m. 2007)
- Children: 3
- Parent(s): Miles Fitzalan-Howard, 17th Duke of Norfolk; Anne Constable-Maxwell

Lady Marcia Mary Josephine Fitzalan Howard (born 10 March 1953), known as Marsha Fitzalan, is an English actress.

== Personal life ==
Born in 1953, Marcia Fitzalan-Howard was the third daughter of Major-General Miles Fitzalan-Howard, 17th Duke of Norfolk, and his wife Anne Constable-Maxwell. She was named after her mother's great-grandmother Marcia Vavasour and educated at the Convent of the Sacred Heart, Woldingham, Surrey. In 1975, her father became Duke of Norfolk, due to the death of a second cousin whose children were all daughters, and she became Lady Marcia.

Fitzalan has been married twice. Her first marriage was to English actor Patrick Ryecart on 4 July 1977. The couple met at drama school, The Webber Douglas Academy, and had three children: Mariella Celia (born 1982), Jemima Carrie (born 1984), and Frederick William Hamlet (born 1987). The two elder children are both married. Fitzalan and Ryecart divorced in 1995.

In June 2007, Fitzalan married her second husband, Nicholas George.

She was a sister-in-law of Sir David Frost, his widow being her elder sister, Lady Carina Fitzalan-Howard. Her brother is the current Duke of Norfolk and Premier Peer of England; another sister, Lady Tessa, married the 5th Earl of Balfour and is the mother of Lady Kinvara Balfour, an English playwright.

== Career ==
She trained at the Webber Douglas Academy. Fitzalan had a varied career in television and film, her outstanding performance being Sarah B'Stard in the television comedy satire The New Statesman. Other television roles included appearances in Upstairs, Downstairs, Shelley, Nancy Astor, The Professionals, Brush Strokes, Goldeneye: The Secret Life of Ian Fleming, Spymaker: The Secret Life of Ian Fleming, Murder Most Horrid, Midsomer Murders, Under the Hammer and Poirot: Evil Under the Sun. The Booze Cruise with Martin Clunes, Winter Solstice.

Films include Being Julia with Annette Bening, Importance of Being Earnest and An Ideal Husband with Rupert Everett.

She stood in for Queen Elizabeth II during rehearsals of the State Opening of Parliament during her reign.
