= Haddington Burghs =

Former parliamentary constituency in the United Kingdom

- Former district of Burghs constituency for the House of Commons
- Major settlements: Haddington, Dunbar, North Berwick, Lauder, Jedburgh

1708–1885
- Seats: one
- Created from: Dunbar, Haddington, Jedburgh, Lauder, North Berwick
- Replaced by: Berwickshire, Haddingtonshire, Roxburghshire

Haddington Burghs was a Scottish district of burghs constituency of the House of Commons of Great Britain (at Westminster) from 1708 to 1801 and of the House of Commons of the United Kingdom (also at Westminster) from 1801 until 1885. It elected one Member of Parliament (MP) using the first-past-the-post voting system.

== Creation ==
The British parliamentary constituency was created in 1708 following the Acts of Union, 1707 and replaced the former Parliament of Scotland burgh constituencies of Haddington, Dunbar, Jedburgh, Lauder and North Berwick.

== Boundaries ==
The constituency consisted of the Haddingtonshire burghs of Haddington, Dunbar, and North Berwick, the Berwickshire burgh of Lauder, and the Roxburghshire burgh of Jedburgh.

== History ==
The constituency elected one Member of Parliament (MP) by the first past the post system until the seat was abolished for the 1885 general election.

In 1885, Haddington, Dunbar, and North Berwick were merged into the county constituency of Haddingtonshire, Lauder was merged into the county constituency of Berwickshire, and Jedburgh was merged into the county constituency of Roxburghshire.

== Members of Parliament ==
Year	Member	Party
1708	Sir David Dalrymple, 1st Baronet	
1722	Sir James Dalrymple, 2nd Baronet	
1734	James Fall	
1742	Sir Hew Dalrymple, 2nd Baronet	
1747	Andrew Fletcher	
1761	Sir Hew Dalrymple, 2nd Baronet	
1768	Patrick Warrender	
1774	John Maitland	
1780	Francis Charteris	
1787	William Fullarton	
1790	Thomas Maitland	
1796	Robert Baird	
1802	Thomas Maitland	
1805	Sir John Hamilton-Dalrymple, 5th Baronet	
1806	Henry Erskine	Whig
1806	William Lamb, 2nd Viscount Melbourne	Whig
1807	Sir George Warrender, 4th Baronet	
1812	Thomas Maitland	
1813	Anthony Maitland	
1818	Dudley North	Whig
1820	Sir Hew Dalrymple-Hamilton, 4th Baronet	
1826	Sir Adolphus Dalrymple, 2nd Baronet	Tory
May 1831	Robert Steuart	Whig (Unseated on petition)
August 1831	Sir Adolphus Dalrymple, 2nd Baronet	Tory
1832	Robert Steuart	Whig
1841	James Maitland Balfour	Conservative
1847	Sir Henry Ferguson Davie	Whig
1859	Sir Henry Ferguson Davie	Liberal
1878	Lord William Hay	Liberal
1879	Sir David Wedderburn, 3rd Baronet	Liberal
1882	Alexander Craig Sellar	Liberal

== Election results ==
=== Elections in the 1830s ===
General election 1830: Haddington Burghs
Party	Candidate	Votes	%
Tory	Adolphus Dalrymple	Unopposed	
Registered electors		c. 99	
Tory hold			

General election 1831: Haddington Burghs
Party	Candidate	Votes	%
Whig	Robert Steuart	3	60.0
Tory	Adolphus Dalrymple	2	40.0
Majority		1	20.0
Turnout		5	c. 5.1
Registered electors		c. 99	
Whig gain from Tory			

- On petition, Steuart was unseated in favour of Dalrymple

General election 1832: Haddington Burghs
Party	Candidate	Votes	%
Whig	Robert Steuart	Unopposed	
Registered electors		545	
Whig hold			

General election 1835: Haddington Burghs
Party	Candidate	Votes	%
Whig	Robert Steuart	Unopposed	
Registered electors		601	
Whig hold			

Steuart was appointed as a Lord Commissioner of the Treasury, requiring a by-election.

By-election, 2 May 1835: Haddington Burghs
Party	Candidate	Votes	%
Whig	Robert Steuart	Unopposed	
Whig hold			

General election 1837: Haddington Burghs
Party	Candidate	Votes	%
Whig	Robert Steuart	268	53.1
Conservative	Thomas Buchan-Hepburn	237	46.9
Majority		31	6.2
Turnout		505	79.5
Registered electors		635	
Whig hold			

=== Elections in the 1840s ===
General election 1841: Haddington Burghs
Party	Candidate	Votes	%	±%
Conservative	James Maitland Balfour	273	50.8	+3.9
Whig	Robert Steuart	264	49.2	−3.9
Majority		9	1.6	N/A
Turnout		537	82.6	+3.1
Registered electors		650		
Conservative gain from Whig		Swing	+3.9	

General election 1847: Haddington Burghs
Party	Candidate	Votes	%	±%
Whig	Henry Ferguson Davie	Unopposed		
Registered electors		775		
Whig gain from Conservative				

=== Elections in the 1850s ===
General election 1852: Haddington Burghs
Party	Candidate	Votes	%	±%
Whig	Henry Ferguson Davie	312	62.8	N/A
Conservative	Archibald Campbell Swinton	185	37.2	New
Majority		127	25.6	N/A
Turnout		497	77.4	N/A
Registered electors		642		
Whig hold		Swing	N/A	

General election 1857: Haddington Burghs
Party	Candidate	Votes	%	±%
Whig	Henry Ferguson Davie	Unopposed		
Registered electors		741		
Whig hold				

General election 1859: Haddington Burghs
Party	Candidate	Votes	%	±%
Liberal	Henry Ferguson Davie	Unopposed		
Registered electors		657		
Liberal hold				

=== Elections in the 1860s ===
General election 1865: Haddington Burghs
Party	Candidate	Votes	%	±%
Liberal	Henry Ferguson Davie	Unopposed		
Registered electors		698		
Liberal hold				

General election 1868: Haddington Burghs
Party	Candidate	Votes	%	±%
Liberal	Henry Ferguson Davie	Unopposed		
Registered electors		1,477		
Liberal hold				

=== Elections in the 1870s ===
General election 1874: Haddington Burghs
Party	Candidate	Votes	%	±%
Liberal	Henry Ferguson Davie	Unopposed		
Registered electors		1,753		
Liberal hold				

Davie resigned, causing a by-election.

1878 Haddington Burghs by-election
Party	Candidate	Votes	%	±%
Liberal	William Hay	881	57.5	N/A
Conservative	James Grant-Suttie	651	42.5	New
Majority		230	15.0	N/A
Turnout		1,532	83.3	N/A
Registered electors		1,840		
Liberal hold		Swing	N/A	

Hay succeeded to the peerage, becoming the 10th Marquess of Tweeddale.

1879 Haddington Burghs by-election
Party	Candidate	Votes	%	±%
Liberal	David Wedderburn	921	56.0	N/A
Conservative	John Macdonald	723	44.0	N/A
Majority		198	12.0	N/A
Turnout		1,644	89.1	N/A
Registered electors		1,846		
Liberal hold		Swing	N/A	

=== Elections in the 1880s ===
General election 1880: Haddington Burghs
Party	Candidate	Votes	%	±%
Liberal	David Wedderburn	1,019	62.7	N/A
Conservative	James Flower Houston	607	37.3	N/A
Majority		412	25.4	N/A
Turnout		1,626	85.8	N/A
Registered electors		1,896		
Liberal hold		Swing		

Wedderburn resigned, causing a by-election.

By-election, 24 Aug 1882: Haddington Burghs
Party	Candidate	Votes	%	±%
Liberal	Alexander Craig Sellar	833	60.5	−2.2
Conservative	Walter Scott Seton-Karr	544	39.5	+2.2
Majority		289	21.0	−4.4
Turnout		1,377	74.9	−10.9
Registered electors		1,839		
Liberal hold		Swing	−2.2	
