= 1878 Haddington Burghs by-election =

UK Parliamentary by-election

The 1878 Haddington Burghs by-election was fought on 3 August 1878. The by-election was fought due to the resignation of the incumbent Liberal MP, Sir Henry Ferguson Davie. It was won by the Liberal candidate Lord William Hay.

1878 Haddington Burghs by-election
Party	Candidate	Votes	%	±%
Liberal	William Hay	881	57.5	N/A
Conservative	James Grant-Suttie	651	42.5	New
Majority		230	15.0	N/A
Turnout		1,532	83.3	N/A
Registered electors		1,840		
Liberal hold		Swing	N/A	
