= Sir Hew Dalrymple-Hamilton, 4th Baronet =

Scottish politician

Sir Hew Dalrymple-Hamilton, 4th Baronet (1774 – 23 February 1834) was a Scottish politician.

== Early life ==
He was the eldest son of Sir Hew Dalrymple, 3rd Baronet. He succeeded his father in February 1800 and took the additional surname of Hamilton.

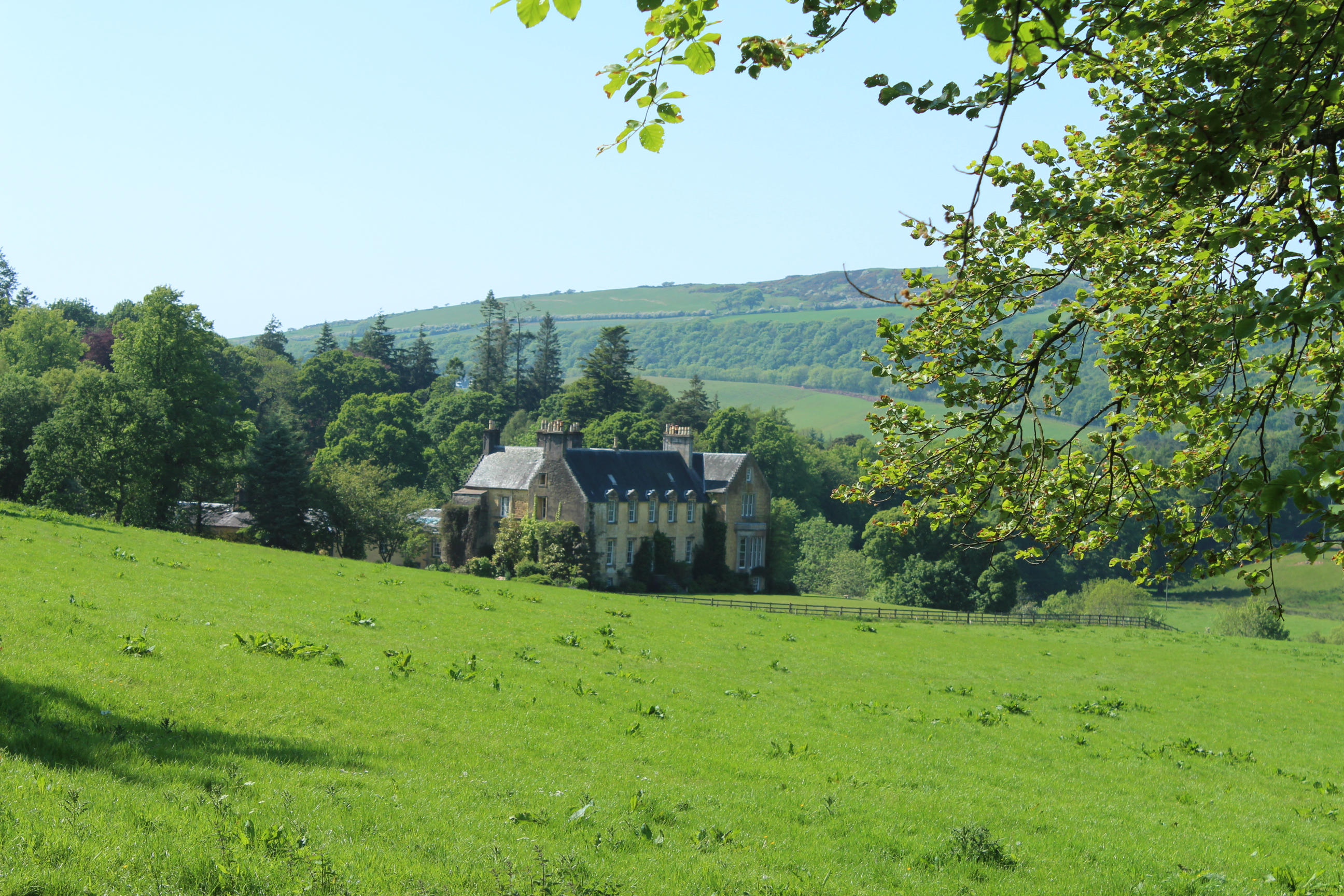
Bargany House, Ayrshire, the Dalrymple family seat

He matriculated at Christ Church, Oxford on 24 October 1791. On 16 June 1814, he was made a DCL.

== Career ==
He served in the British Army as an ensign in the 1st Foot Guards from 1792, as a lieutenant and captain from 1794 and as a major in the 28th Light Dragoons from 1799 to c.1800.

He was the Member of Parliament (MP) for Haddingtonshire 1795–1800, Ayrshire 1803-1807 and 1811–1818 and Haddington Burghs 1820–1826.

== Personal life ==
He had married the Hon. Jane Duncan, daughter of Adam Duncan, 1st Viscount Duncan and had one daughter, who married Augustin-Gustave de Franquetot, 3rd Duke of Coigny.

He died at Bargany in 1834. He was succeeded in the baronetcy by his brother Sir John Hamilton-Dalrymple, 5th Baronet.

Parliament of Great Britain
Preceded by John Hamilton	Member of Parliament for Haddingtonshire; 1795–1800	Succeeded by Charles Hope
Parliament of the United Kingdom
Preceded by William Fullarton	Member of Parliament for Ayrshire; 1803–1807	Succeeded by David Boyle
Preceded by David Boyle	Member of Parliament for Ayrshire; 1811–1818	Succeeded by James Montgomerie
Preceded by Dudley Long North	Member of Parliament for Haddington Burghs; 1820–1826	Succeeded by Sir Adolphus Dalrymple, Bt
Baronetage of Nova Scotia
Preceded by Hew Dalrymple	Baronet (of Bargeny); 1800–1834	Succeeded by John Hamilton-Dalrymple
