= Elizabeth Balfour, Countess of Balfour =

British suffragette and politician

The Right Honourable The Countess of Balfour
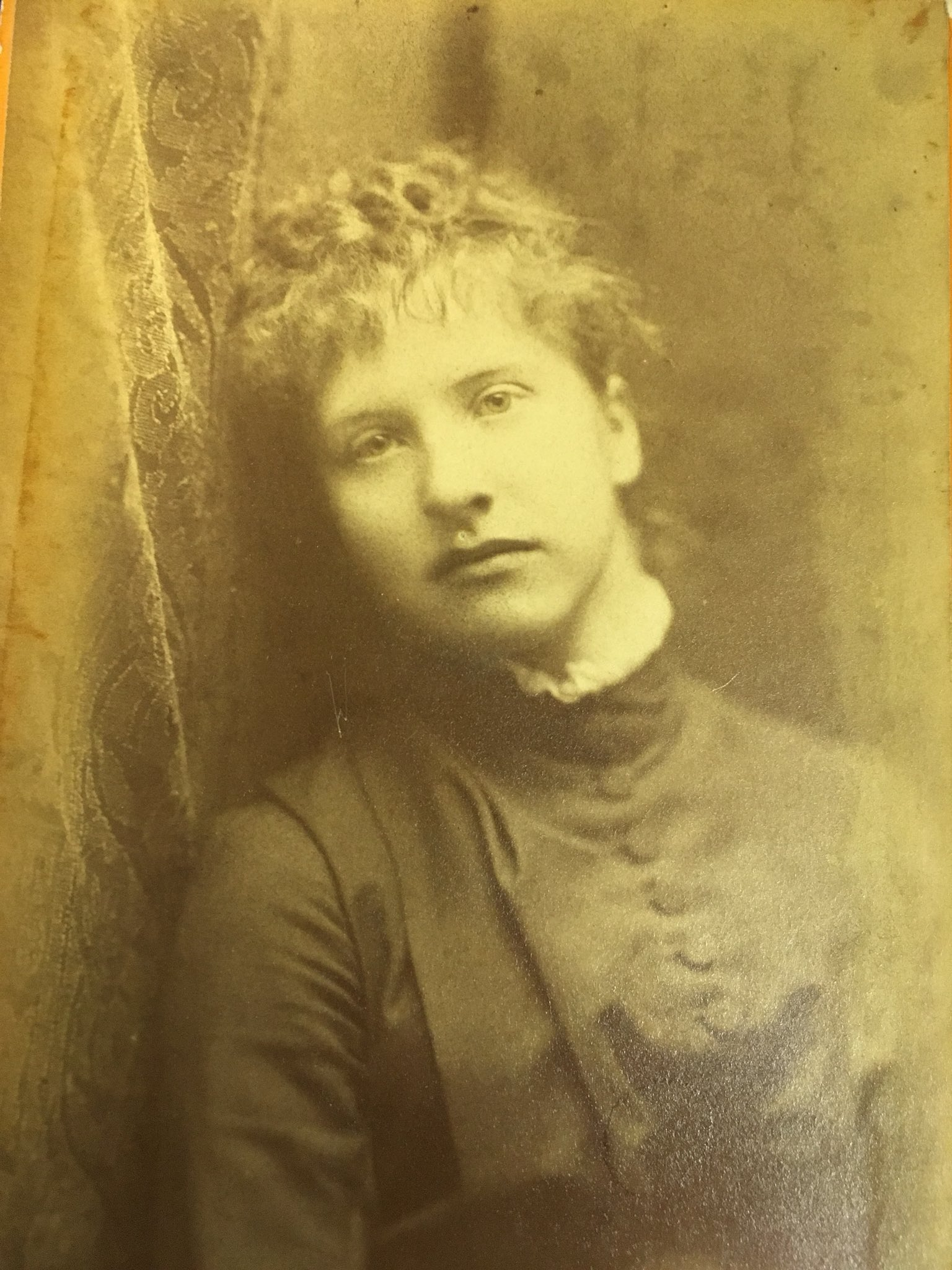

Woking Borough Councilwoman from St John's Ward
- In office 1919–????

President of the Conservative and Unionist Women's Franchise Association Edinburgh Chapter

Dame President of the Primrose League's Woking Habitation

Personal details
- Born: Elizabeth Edith Bulwer-Lytton; 12 June 1867 Hyde Park Gate, London, England
- Died: 28 March 1942 (aged 74) Fisher's Hill, Woking, Surrey, England
- Party: Conservative
- Spouse: Gerald Balfour, 2nd Earl of Balfour (m. 1887)
- Children: 6 (including Eve and Robert, 3rd Earl of Balfour)
- Parent(s): Robert Bulwer-Lytton, 1st Earl of Lytton; Edith Villiers
- Occupation: Politician, writer, and suffragette

Elizabeth Edith Balfour, Countess of Balfour (née Lady Elizabeth Bulwer-Lytton; 12 June 1867 – 28 March 1942) was a British suffragette, politician, and writer. A staunch Conservative, she served as Dame President of the Woking Habitation of the Primrose League and was a founding member of the Conservative and Unionist Women's Franchise Association, serving as president of the association's chapter in Edinburgh. After the 1910 Conciliation Bill failed to pass in the House of Commons, she went on a speaking tour across the United Kingdom to rally support for women's suffrage. In 1919, Lady Balfour became the first woman to sit on the Woking Borough Council.

== Early life and family ==
Lady Balfour was born Elizabeth Edith Bulwer-Lytton at Hyde Park Gate on 12 June 1867 to The Honourable Robert Bulwer-Lytton, a poet and diplomat, and Edith Villiers, a lady-in-waiting to Queen Victoria. Lady Balfour was one of seven children. Her siblings included Lady Constance Bulwer-Lytton, Lady Emily Lutyens, Victor Bulwer-Lytton, 2nd Earl of Lytton, and Neville Bulwer-Lytton, 3rd Earl of Lytton.

On her father's side, she was a granddaughter of Edward Bulwer-Lytton, 1st Baron Lytton and Rosina Bulwer Lytton, Lady Lytton and a great-granddaughter of women's rights advocate Anna Wheeler. On her mother's side, she was a great granddaughter of George Villiers and Theresa Parker, a grand niece of George Villiers, 4th Earl of Clarendon, and niece of Henry Loch, 1st Baron Loch (the husband of her mother's twin sister).

During Lady Balfour's childhood, her father was posted to Lisbon, Madrid, and Vienna. She and her sisters were educated by governesses. In 1876, her parents were appointed as the Viceroy and Vicereine of India and the family moved into the Viceroy's Palace. Her father resigned from the position in 1880 and was created Earl of Lytton, at which time she became entitled to the style Lady Edith Bulwer-Lytton. The family returned from India that same year, and took up residence at Knebworth House in Hertfordshire. Her father later served as the British Ambassador to France. As her father's travel companion, she took on many of her mother's duties as a society hostess.

== Politics ==
Lady Balfour was very politically active, and was a member of the Primrose League, which supported Conservative causes. A supporter for women's rights, she joined the National Union of Women's Suffrage Societies. She believed in women's education, and encouraged all of her daughters to attend institutions of higher education, supporting her eldest daughter to train as a doctor and a younger daughter to study agriculture at Reading University.

In 1908, along with the Countess of Selborne, Alice Blanche Balfour, Lady Rayleigh, Lady Robert Cecil, Lady Edward Spencer-Churchill, Lady Lockyear, the Countess of Meath, Viscountess Midleton, Lady Strachey, Constance Jones, Dame Margaret Tuke, and Louisa Twining, Lady Balfour helped establish the Conservative and Unionist Women's Franchise Association. She later became president of the association's chapter in Edinburgh. She also served as the vice president of the International Women's Franchise Club.

She served as the Dame President of the Woking Habitation of the Primrose League, but resigned in 1910 after Conservative MP Donald Macmaster opposed the Conciliation Bill. After the failure of the 1910 Conciliation Bill, Lady Balfour spoke on the Conservative and Unionist Women's Franchise Association's platform across Britain. She gave speeches in Kendal, Penzance, Gloucester, and Ulster. In 1913, she gave speeches in Worcestershire, Lancashire, Cheshire, Shropshire, Staffordshire, and Gloucestershire. Her sister-in-law, Lady Frances Balfour, said that Balfour's action to challenge Conservative leaders to support women's rights was one of the most difficult tasks of the suffrage campaign.

Lady Balfour was supportive of the Women's Social and Political Union (WSPU) and, in 1911, she chaired a meeting in Nairn where Emmeline Pankhurst was the speaker. She opposed violent actions taken by the WSPU, however, and when a medieval church in East Lothian was burned down by suffragettes, she raised funds for its reconstruction.

In April 1919, Lady Balfour became the first woman elected to the Woking Borough Council, representing St John's Ward.

== Writing ==
Lady Balfour wrote a history of her father's administration in India, titled The History of Lord Lytton's Indian Administration, 1876 to 1880, before his death in 1891. She also published a selection of her father's poems in 1894 and edited The Personal and Literary Letters of Robert, First Earl of Lytton in 1906.

In 1910, the Conservative and Unionist Women's Franchise Association published Lady Balfour's analysis of a debate in the House of Commons on the Women's Franchise Bill. In 1925, she edited Letters of Constance Lytton, written by her sister Lady Constance.

== Personal life ==
In 1887, she married Gerald Balfour of Whittingehame House, a Scottish aristocrat and Conservative Member of Parliament. Her husband was the brother of the future Prime Minister Arthur Balfour, 1st Earl of Balfour and a nephew of Prime Minister Robert Gascoyne-Cecil, 3rd Marquess of Salisbury. Another of her husband's brothers, architect Eustace Balfour, married Lady Frances Campbell, who became her close friend and was also involved in the campaign for women's suffrage. Her husband served as the Chief Secretary of Ireland and as President of the Board of Trade.

They had five daughters and one son:

- Lady Eleanor Balfour (1890 – d. after 1980)
- Lady Ruth Balfour (d. 30 August 1967)
- Lady Mary Edith Balfour (d. 21 January 1894 – 1980)
- Lady Evelyn Barbara "Eve" Balfour (16 July 1898 – 1990)
- Robert Arthur Lytton Balfour, 3rd Earl of Balfour (31 December 1902 – 28 November 1968)
- Lady Kathleen Constance Blanche Balfour (1912 – 20 August 1996).

In 1900, they moved to Woking, Surrey. They commissioned Lady Balfour's brother-in-law, Edwin Lutyens, to design a country house in Hook Heath, Woking. They hired Gertrude Jekyll to design the gardens. The Balfours moved in to the house, Fisher Hill, in 1901. They hosted many social and musical gatherings and parties at the house.

Through her husband's social connections, she became associated with the elite social and intellectual group The Souls. She was a talented musician and became a close friend of the composer and suffragist Dame Ethel Smyth, who was also her neighbour.

Her husband succeeded his brother as Earl of Balfour in 1930, at which time she became the Countess of Balfour.

== Death and legacy ==
Lady Balfour died of a perforated duodenal ulcer on 28 March 1942 at Fisher's Hill's cottage in Woking.

Balfour road in Westfield is named after her.
