= Elphinstone-Dalrymple baronets =

Baronetcy in the Baronetage of the United Kingdom

Escutcheon of the Dalrymple-Horn-Elphinstone baronets

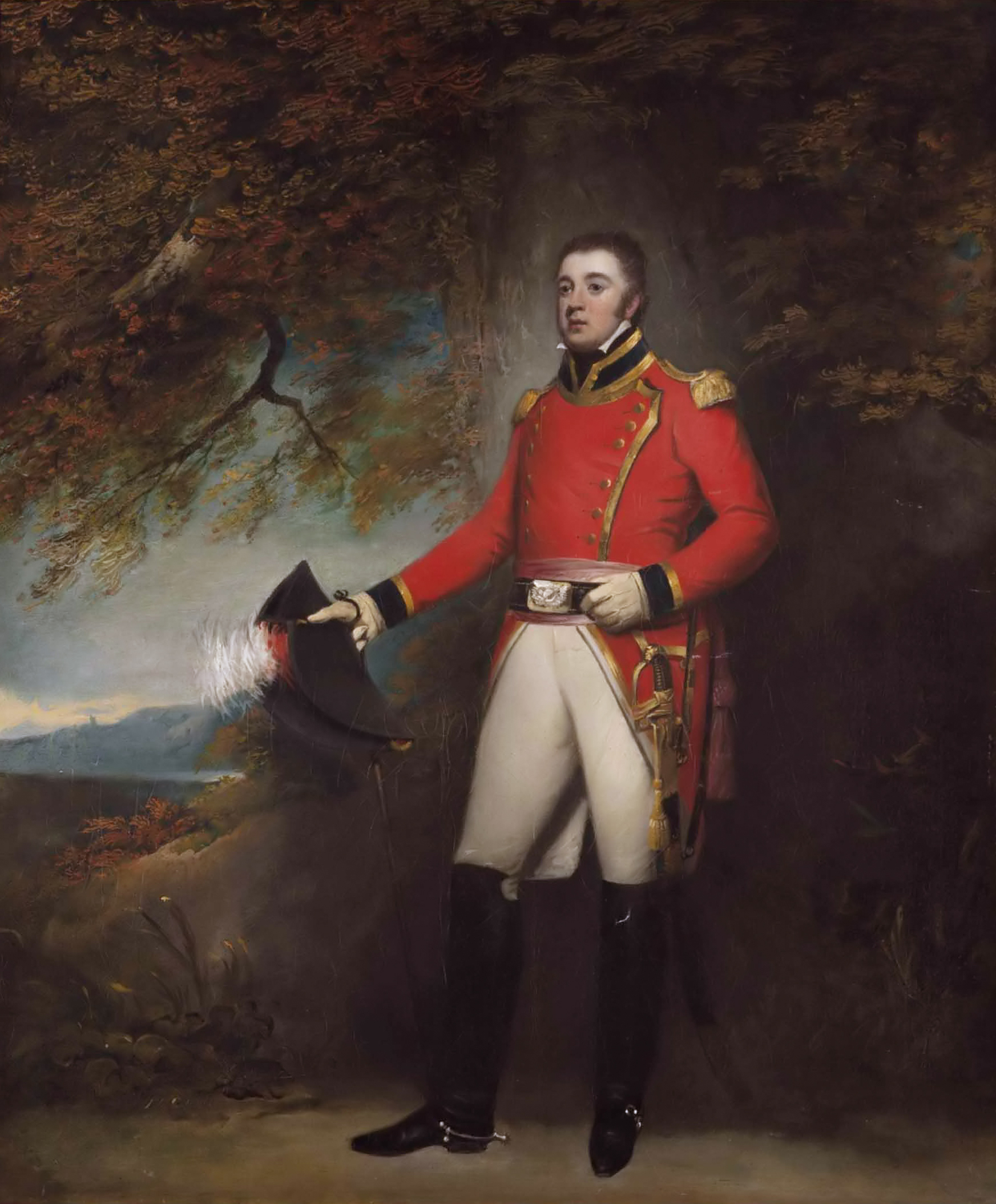
The 1st Baronet, portrait by John Westbrooke Chandler, 1799)

The Dalrymple-Horn-Elphinstone (later Elphinstone-Dalrymple) baronetcy, of Horn and of Logie Elphinstone in the County of Aberdeen, is a dormant title in the Baronetage of the United Kingdom. It was created on 16 January 1828 for Robert Dalrymple-Horn-Elphinstone. He was the grandson of Hew Elphinstone, second son of Hew Dalrymple, Lord North Berwick (see Hamilton-Dalrymple baronets), third son of James Dalrymple, 1st Viscount of Stair (see the Earl of Stair). The second Baronet sat as Member of Parliament for Portsmouth. The fifth Baronet assumed the surname of Elphinstone-Dalrymple. The title became either extinct or dormant on the death of the seventh Baronet in 1956.

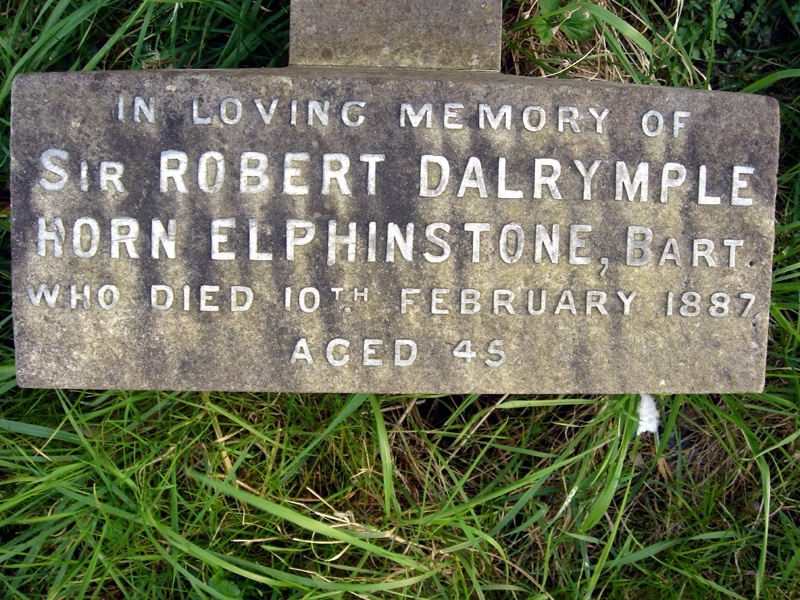
Funerary monument, Brompton Cemetery, London, for Sir Robert, 3rd Baronet

== Dalrymple-Horn-Elphinstone (later Elphinstone-Dalrymple) baronets, of Horn and of Logie Elphinstone (1828) ==
- Sir Robert Dalrymple-Horn-Elphinstone, 1st Baronet (1766–1848)
- Sir James Dalrymple-Horn-Elphinstone, 2nd Baronet (1805–1886)
- Sir Robert Dalrymple-Horn-Elphinstone, 3rd Baronet (1841–1887)
- Sir Graeme Hepburn Dalrymple-Horn-Elphinstone, 4th Baronet (1841–1900)
- Sir Robert Graeme Elphinstone-Dalrymple, 5th Baronet (1844–1908)
- Sir Edward Arthur Elphinstone-Dalrymple, 6th Baronet (1877–1913)
- Sir Francis Napier Elphinstone-Dalrymple, 7th Baronet (1882–1956) (extinct or dormant)

== See also ==
- Earl of Stair
- Hamilton-Dalrymple baronets

Baronetage of the United Kingdom
Preceded by Doyle baronets	Dalrymple-Horn-Elphinstone baronets of Horn and of Logie Elphinstone; 16 January 1828	Succeeded by Vivian baronets
