= Samuel Palmer (surgeon) =

Samuel Palmer FRS (1670–1738) was an early 18th century wealthy British surgeon.

== Life ==
He was born on 5 January 1670 the son of John Palmer and his wife Alice.

He worked in St. Bartholomew's Hospital in London and served as its treasurer.

On 5 December 1728 he was elected a Fellow of the Royal Society of London.

He died in London on 20 April 1738 aged 68. His grave monument in Wandsworth Parish Church is by Peter Scheemakers.

== Family ==
He was married to Sarah Still. They had two daughters, Frances and Elizabeth.

His daughter Frances Palmer (1689-1766) married his colleague at Bartholomew's Hospital, Sir Peter Sainthill FRS of Wandsworth.
