= Ladies Empire Club =

Coordinates: 51°30′42.25″N 0°8′46.4″W

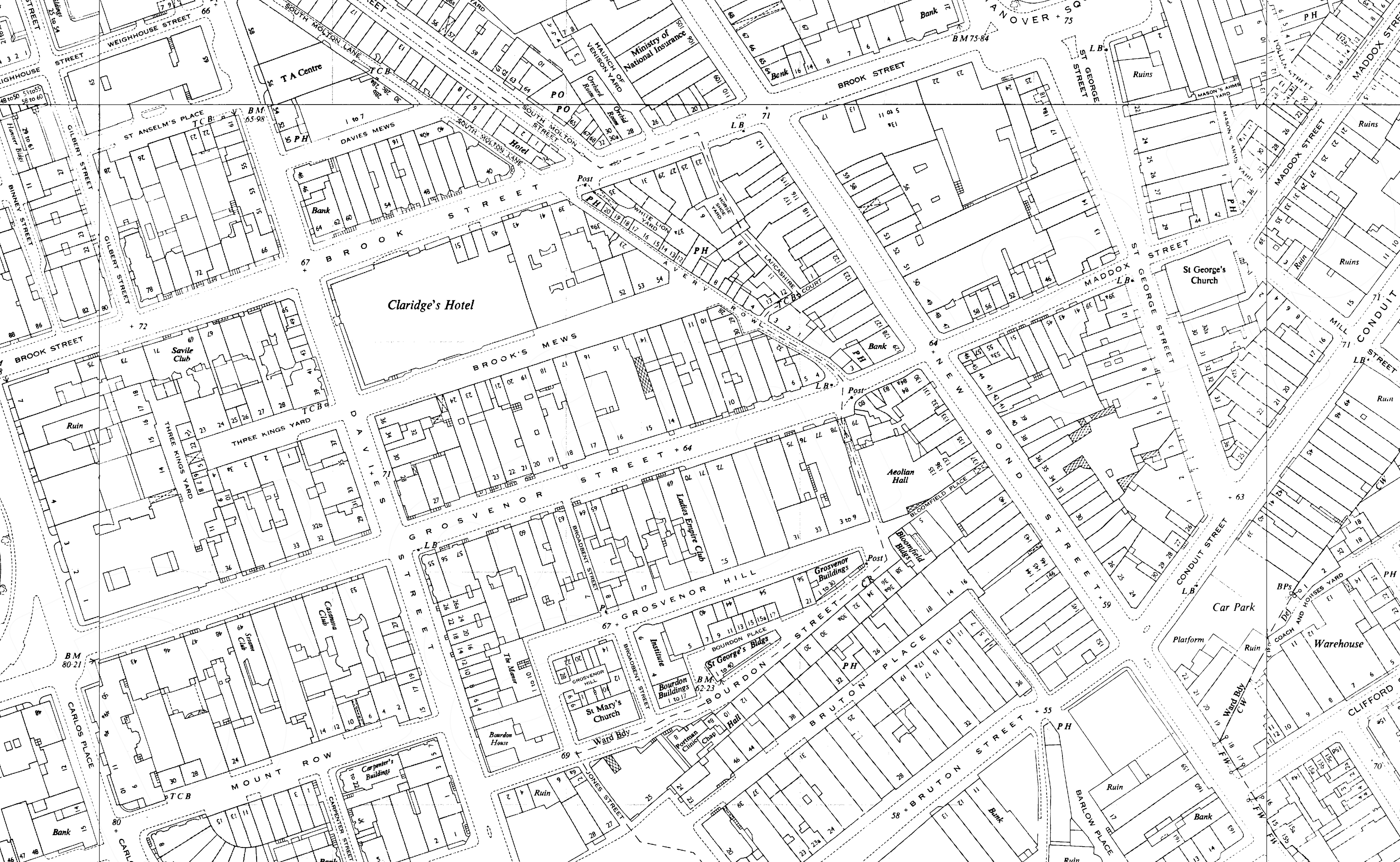
The Ladies Empire Club (centre) on a 1952 Ordnance Survey map.

The Ladies Empire Club was a private members' club for women. It was located at 69 Grosvenor Street, at the east end on the south side, in the Mayfair district of London.

== Foundation ==
The club was founded by members of the Victoria League to strengthen the league's work in providing hospitality to its British and visiting colonial members, as well as the wives and parties of visiting colonial politicians. It was opened in 1902 by the colonial secretary Joseph Chamberlain and by 1906 had 700 members from the United Kingdom and 350 from British colonies. The club was independent but the Victoria League retained the right to nominate one third of the club's central committee.

== Activities and membership ==
To be eligible for membership, two references were required, one to propose and apply to the secretary with an introductory note, the other to second the proposal. A joining fee and annual subscription would be required upon receipt of election Members in 1913 included Mrs Stephen Spring-Rice of the London Society for Women's Suffrage, and fellow suffragist Lady Marie Willoughby de Broke.

The club provided spacious and hospitable facilities for reading and playing cards. It had smoking rooms and the bedrooms were "comfortable and attractive". It was particularly popular with Canadian women who came to support women’s rights.

In December 1957, an announcement appeared in The Times that the club would be accommodated at the Ladies Carlton Club from 1 January 1958.
