= Robert Balfour, 3rd Earl of Balfour =

Scottish peer (1902-1968)

The Right Honourable The Earl of Balfour
- Balfour in 1942

Member of the House of Lords
- Lord Temporal
- In office 14 January 1945 – 28 November 1968
- Preceded by: The 2nd Earl of Balfour
- Succeeded by: The 4th Earl of Balfour

Personal details
- Born: Robert Arthur Lytton Balfour; 31 December 1902 Fishers Hill House, Hook Heath, Woking
- Died: 28 November 1968 (aged 65)
- Spouse: Jean Lily West Roundel Cooke-Yarborough (m. 1925)
- Children: 4, including Gerald Balfour, 4th Earl of Balfour
- Parent(s): Gerald Balfour, 2nd Earl of Balfour; Lady Betty Bulwer-Lytton
- Education: Trinity College, Cambridge

Robert Arthur Lytton Balfour, 3rd Earl of Balfour (31 December 1902 – 28 November 1968), styled Viscount Traprain between 1930 and 1945, was a Scottish peer.

== Biography ==
Balfour was the son of Gerald Balfour, a Member of Parliament, and his wife Lady Elizabeth Balfour (née Bulwer-Lytton), a daughter of the 1st Earl of Lytton. He was the nephew of Prime Minister Arthur Balfour, and his father succeeded as Earl of Balfour in 1930. Robert was born on 31 December 1902 at his parent′s residence Fishers Hill House, Hook Heath, Woking, and was educated at Eton and Trinity College, Cambridge. He rose to the rank of Lieutenant in the service of the Royal Naval Reserve and fought in the Second World War.

On 12 February 1925, he married Jean Lily West Roundel Cooke-Yarborough (1900–1981). They had four children:

- Gerald Arthur James Balfour, 4th Earl of Balfour (1925–2003)
- Lady Evelyn Jean Blanche Balfour (1929–2011)
- Lady Alison Emily Balfour (1934–2015)
- Hon. Andrew Maitland Balfour (1936–1948)

From 1952 to 1954, he chaired the Royal Commission on Scottish Affairs, which as a result is also referred to as the Balfour Commission.

== Arms ==
Coat of arms of Robert Balfour, 3rd Earl of Balfour
Crest A palm tree proper. Escutcheon Argent, on a chevron engrailed between three mullets sable as many otters’ heads erased of the field. Supporters Two otters proper, collared or. Motto Virtus ad æthera tendit (Virtue strives toward heaven).

Masonic offices
Preceded by Norman Orr-Ewing	Grand Master of the Grand Lodge of Scotland; 1939–1942	Succeeded by John Christie Stewart
Peerage of the United Kingdom
Preceded by Gerald Balfour	Earl of Balfour; 1945–1968; Member of the House of Lords (1945–1968)	Succeeded by Gerald Balfour
