= Peter Sainthill (surgeon) =

Sir Peter Sainthill F.R.S. (1698–1775) was a British surgeon and a Fellow of the Royal Society who served as Master of the Company of Surgeons (1749-1750).

== Family ==
Sainthill was born in 1698 and was the son of Dr. Peter and Margret Sainthill (née Upton). He married Frances Palmer, the wealthy heiress of Samuel Palmer FRS. Their children included son Samuel (1727–1767) and daughter Margret. Samuel was the father of Fanny Wilmot (1759–1838), first wife of the MP John Wilmot. Margret married Sir Hew Dalrymple, 2nd Baronet in 1743.

== Career ==
Sainthill spent the majority of his career at St. Bartholomew's Hospital.
