= Hamilton-Dalrymple baronets =

Baronetcy in the Baronetage of Nova Scotia

Arms of Dalrymple-Hamilton: quarterly: 1st and 4th grand quarters or on a saltire azure between two water-bougets in flank sable, nine lozenges or of the first (Dalrymple); 2nd and 3rd grand quarters, quarterly 1st and 4th, Gules three Cinquefoils Ermine; 2nd and 3rd, Argent a Galley sales furled Sable; the whole within a Bordure company Argent and Azure, the first charged with Hearts Gules and the second with Mullets Argent (Hamilton of Bargany).

The Dalrymple, later Dalrymple-Hamilton, later Hamilton-Dalrymple Baronetcy, of North Berwick in the County of Haddington, is a title in the Baronetage of Nova Scotia. It was created on 29 April 1697 for the Hon. Hew Dalrymple, Lord President of the Court of Session under the judicial title of Lord North Berwick from 1698 to 1737. He was the third son of James Dalrymple, 1st Viscount of Stair, and the brother of John Dalrymple, 1st Earl of Stair, Sir James Dalrymple, 1st Baronet, of Cranstoun, and Sir David Dalrymple, 1st Baronet, of Hailes. The second Baronet sat as Member of Parliament for Haddington and Haddingtonshire. The third Baronet represented Haddingtonshire in the House of Commons. The fourth Baronet was Member of Parliament for Haddingtonshire, Ayrshire and Haddington. He assumed the additional surname of Hamilton after that of Dalrymple. The fifth Baronet sat as Member of Parliament for Haddington. The eighth Baronet assumed the surname of Hamilton before that of Dalrymple. The tenth Baronet was Lord-Lieutenant of East Lothian from 1987 to 2001.

Hew Dalrymple, grandson of the first Baronet, was created a baronet in 1815 (see Dalrymple baronets). Hew Elphinstone, second son of the first Baronet, was the grandfather of Robert Dalrymple-Horn-Elphinstone, who was created a baronet in 1828 (see Elphinstone-Dalrymple baronets).

== Dalrymple, later Dalrymple-Hamilton, later Hamilton-Dalrymple baronets, of Bargeny, North Berwick (1697) ==
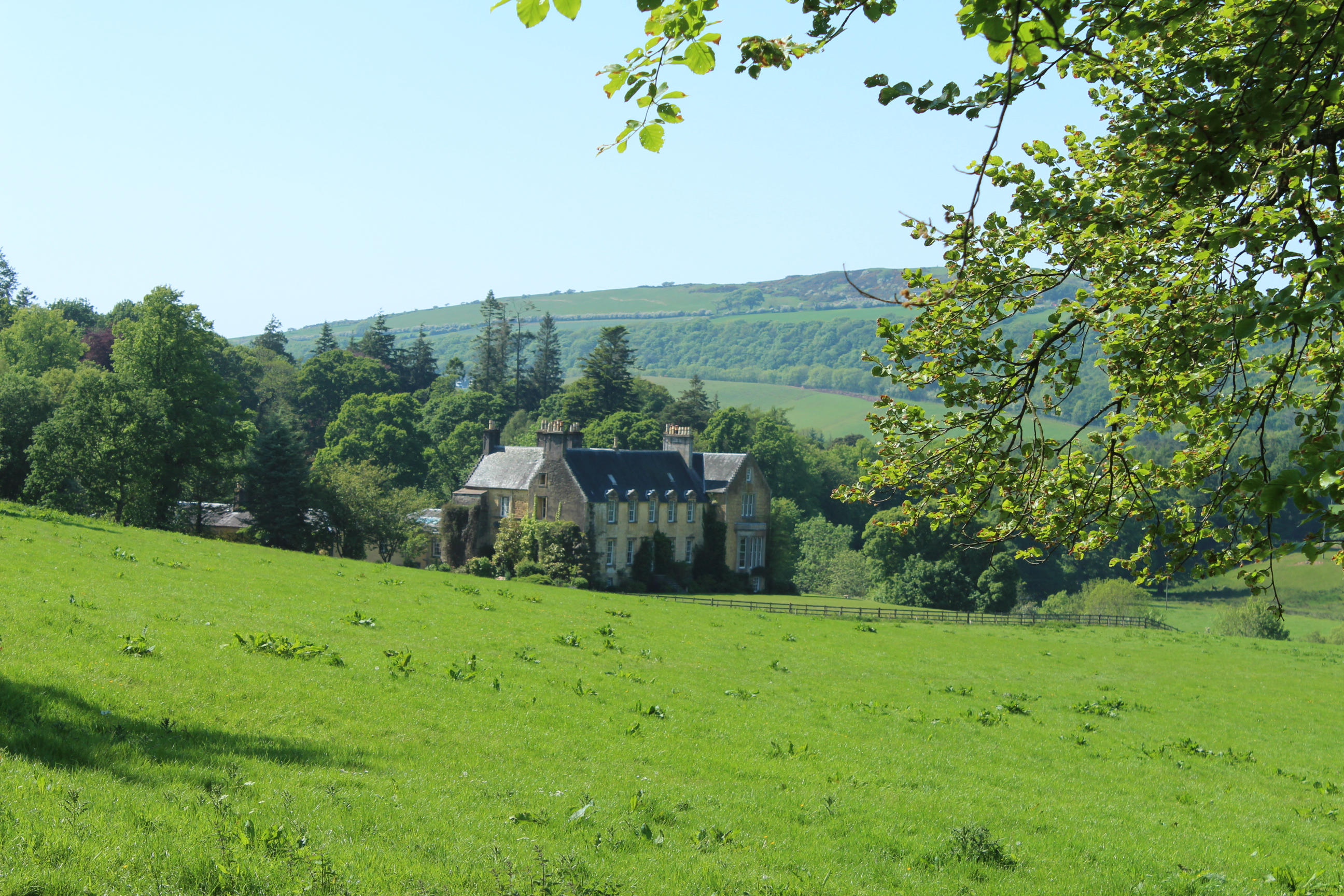
Bargany House, south Ayrshire

- Sir Hew Dalrymple, 1st Baronet (c. 1653–1737)
- Sir Hew Dalrymple, 2nd Baronet (1712–1790)
- Sir Hew Dalrymple, 3rd Baronet (1746–1800)
- Sir Hew Dalrymple-Hamilton, 4th Baronet (1774–1834)
- Sir John Hamilton-Dalrymple, 5th Baronet (1780–1835)
- Sir Hew Dalrymple-Hamilton, 6th Baronet (1814–1887)
- Sir John Warrender Dalrymple-Hamilton, 7th Baronet (1824–1888)
- Sir Walter Hamilton-Dalrymple, 8th Baronet (1854–1920)
- Sir Hew Clifford Hamilton-Dalrymple, 9th Baronet (1888–1959)
- Sir Hew Fleetwood Hamilton-Dalrymple, 10th Baronet (1926–2018)
- Sir Hew Richard Dalrymple, 11th Baronet (born 1955)

The heir apparent is the current holder's son, Hew John Lucien Dalrymple (born 1990).

== See also ==
- Earl of Stair
- Dalrymple baronets
- Elphinstone-Dalrymple baronets
