= Earl of Balfour =

Earldom in the Peerage of the United Kingdom

Earldom of Balfour
- Argent, on a Chevron engrailed between three Mullets Sable as many Otter's heads erased of the first.
- Creation date: 5 May 1922
- Created by: King George V
- Peerage: Peerage of the United Kingdom
- First holder: Arthur Balfour
- Present holder: Roderick Balfour, 5th Earl of Balfour
- Heir presumptive: Hon. Charles Balfour
- Remainder to: Special remainder
- Subsidiary titles: Viscount Traprain
- Status: Extant
- Seat: Burpham Lodge
- Former seat: Whittingehame House
- Motto: VIRTUS AD ÆTHERA TENDIT ("Virtue strives towards heaven")

Earl of Balfour is a title in the Peerage of the United Kingdom. It was created in 1922 for Conservative politician Arthur Balfour, Prime Minister of the United Kingdom from 1902 to 1905 and Foreign Secretary from 1916 to 1919.

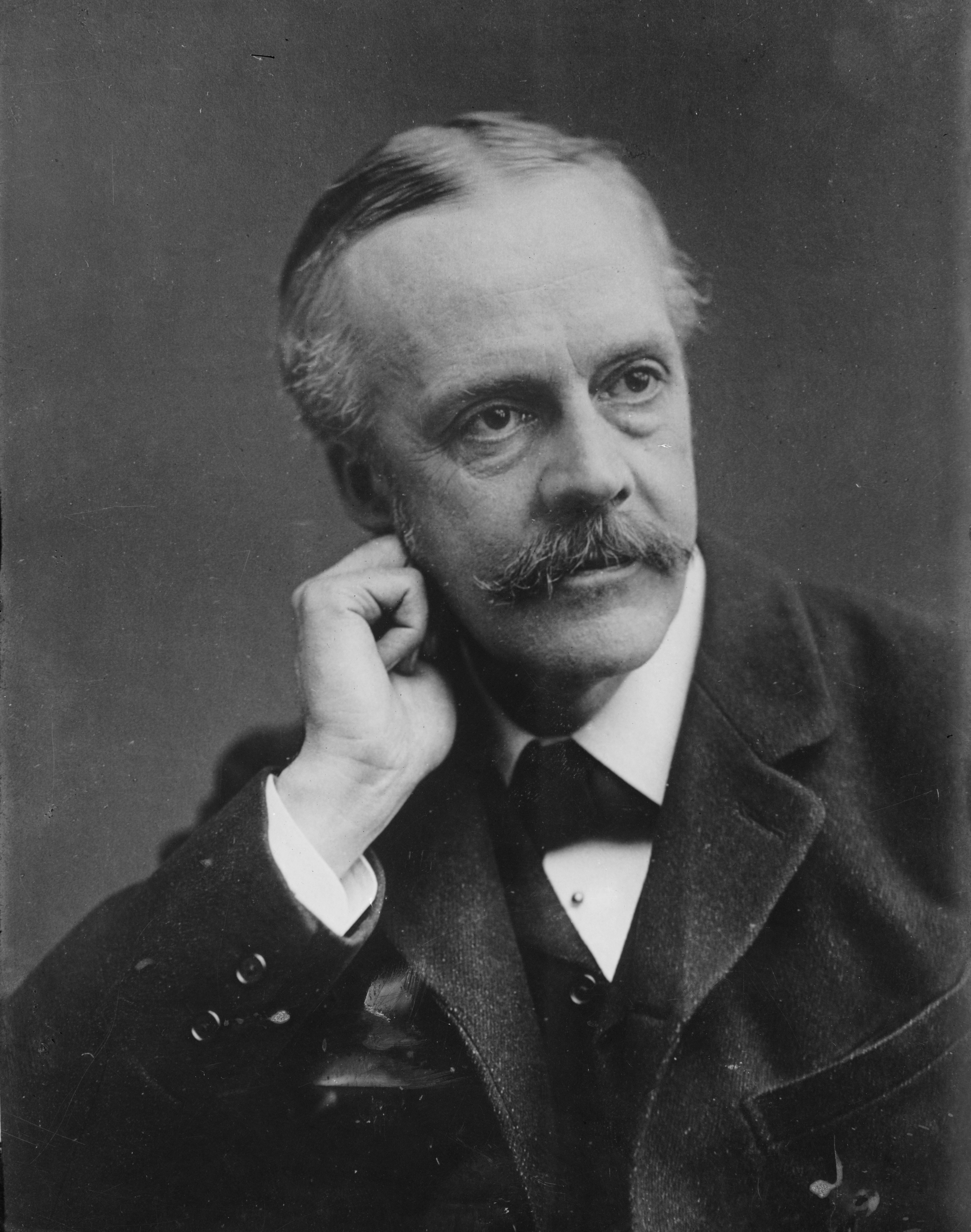
Arthur Balfour, 1st Earl of Balfour

The earldom was created with special remainder, failing male issue of his own, to:

1. his younger brother, the Right Honourable Gerald William Balfour, and the heirs male of his body, failing which to
2. his nephew Francis Cecil Campbell Balfour and the heirs male of his body, and failing which to
3. his nephew Oswald Herbert Campbell Balfour and the heirs male of his body.

The latter two were the sons of his deceased youngest brother Colonel Eustace James Anthony Balfour. Balfour was made Viscount Traprain, of Whittingehame in the County of Haddington, at the same time as he was given the earldom. This title is also in the Peerage of the United Kingdom and was created with similar remainder.

Balfour never married, and was succeeded according to the special remainders by his younger brother Gerald, the second Earl. He was also a Conservative politician and notably served as Chief Secretary for Ireland, as President of the Board of Trade and as President of the Local Government Board. This line of the family failed on the death of his grandson, the fourth Earl, in 2003. As of 2017 the titles are held by his second cousin once removed, the fifth Earl. He is the grandson of the aforementioned Francis Cecil Campbell Balfour, nephew of the first Earl.

The family seat is Burpham Lodge, near Arundel, Sussex.

== Earl of Balfour (1922) ==
- Arthur James Balfour, 1st Earl of Balfour (1848–1930)
- Gerald William Balfour, 2nd Earl of Balfour (1853–1945)
- Robert Arthur Lytton Balfour, 3rd Earl of Balfour (1902–1968)
- Gerald Arthur James Balfour, 4th Earl of Balfour (1925–2003)
- Roderick Francis Arthur Balfour, 5th Earl of Balfour (born 1948)

The heir presumptive is the present holder's brother, the Hon. (Note: The present holder's brother was allowed by a warrant of precedence from Elizabeth II to use the style of Honourable, because their father would have held the peerage but for his predeceasing the previous holder.) Charles George Yule Balfour (born 1951).
The heir presumptive's heir apparent is his son, George Eustace Charles Balfour (born 1991).

=== Title succession chart ===
Title succession chart, Earls of Balfour.

James M. Balfour; 1820–1856
Viscount Traprain; Earl of Balfour
Arthur Balfour; 1st Earl of Balfour; 1848–1930; Prime Minister of the United Kingdom; 1902–1905 | Cecil C. Balfour; 1849–1881 | Francis M. Balfour; 1851–1882 | Gerald Balfour; 2nd Earl of Balfour; 1853–1945 | Col. Eustace Balfour; 1854–1911
Robert Balfour; 3rd Earl of Balfour; 1902–1968 | Lt. Col. Francis Balfour; 1884–1965
Gerald Balfour; 4th Earl of Balfour; 1925–2003 | Hon. Andrew M. Balfour; 1936–1948 | Eustace Balfour; 1921–2000
Roderick Balfour; 5th Earl of Balfour born 1948 | Hon. Charles Balfour born 1951
George Balfour born 1991

=== Line of succession ===
Line of succession
- James Maitland Balfour (1820–1856)
  - Arthur James Balfour, 1st Earl of Balfour (1848–1930)
  - Gerald William Balfour, 2nd Earl of Balfour (1853–1945)
    - Robert Arthur Lytton Balfour, 3rd Earl of Balfour (1902–1968)
      - Gerald Arthur James Balfour, 4th Earl of Balfour (1925–2003)
  - Col. Eustace James Anthony Balfour (1854–1911)
    - Lt. Col. Francis Cecil Campbell Balfour (1884–1965)
      - Eustace Arthur Goschen Balfour (1921–2000)
        - Roderick Francis Arthur Balfour, 5th Earl of Balfour (born 1948)
        - (1) Hon. Charles George Yule Balfour (born 1951)
          - (2) George Eustace Charles Balfour (born 1991)

== Arms ==
Coat of arms of Balfour, Earls of Balfour
| Crest A palm tree proper. Escutcheon Argent, on a chevron engrailed between three mullets sable as many otters’ heads erased of the field. Supporters Two otters proper, collared or. Motto Virtus ad æthera tendit (Virtue strives toward heaven). |

== See also ==
- Francis Maitland Balfour
- James Maitland Balfour
