= Jedburgh (Parliament of Scotland constituency) =

Jedburgh in Roxburghshire was a royal burgh that returned one commissioner to the Parliament of Scotland and to the Convention of Estates.

After the Acts of Union 1707, Jedburgh, North Berwick, Dunbar, Haddington and Lauder formed the Haddington district of burghs, returning one member between them to the House of Commons of Great Britain.

== List of burgh commissioners ==
- 1661–63, 1665 convention, 1667 convention, 1669–74: John Rutherford, provost
- 1678 convention: James McCubie, provost
- 1681–82, 1685–86: Andro Ainslie, provost
- 1689 convention, 1689–1700: Adam Ainslie, baillie (died 1700)
- 1700–02, 1702–07: Walter Scott, provost

== See also ==
- List of constituencies in the Parliament of Scotland at the time of the Union
