= Dunbar (Parliament of Scotland constituency) =

Dunbar in Haddingtonshire was a royal burgh that returned one commissioner to the Parliament of Scotland and to the Convention of Estates.

After the Acts of Union 1707, Dunbar, North Berwick, Haddington, Jedburgh and Lauder formed the Haddington district of burghs, returning one member between them to the House of Commons of Great Britain.

== List of burgh commissioners ==
- 1661–63, 1665 convention, 1667 convention, 1669–74: James Lauder, merchant-burgess
- 1678 convention: James Kellie, merchant, bailie
- 1681–82: James Hamilton, merchant, bailie
- 1685–96, 1689 convention, 1689–90: James Smith, merchant (expelled)
- 1693–1701: Robert Fall, bailie
- 1702–07: Robert Kellie, bailie

== See also ==
- List of constituencies in the Parliament of Scotland at the time of the Union
