= Elizabeth Balfour (midwife) =

Elizabeth 'Betty' Balfour
- Born: Elizabeth Anderson; 1832; Papa Little, Shetland
- Died: 18 March 1918 (aged 85–86)
- Occupation: howdie (uncertified midwife)
- Spouse: James (Jeemie) Balfour

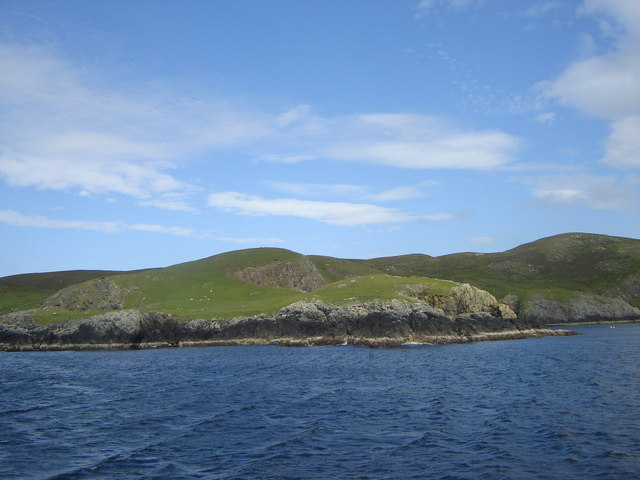
Western edge of Rit Ness, Papa Little

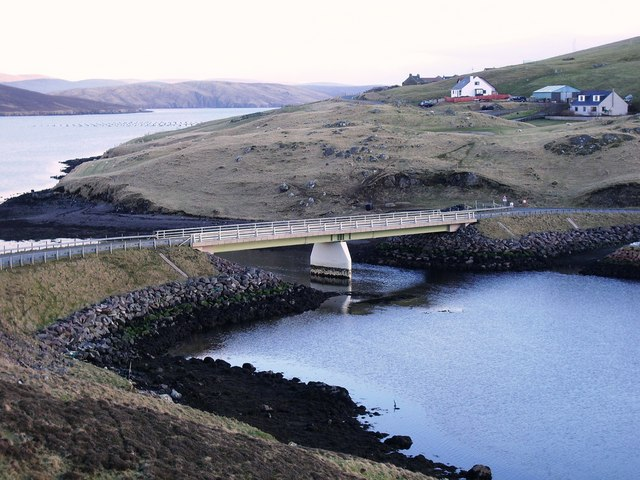
Bridge to Muckle Roe, Shetland

Elizabeth Balfour (Betty) née Anderson (1832 – 18 March 1918) was a howdie (uncertified midwife) from Papa Little, Shetland.

== Biography ==
Elizabeth 'Betty' Anderson was born in 1832 to crofters, Barbara Jamieson and Thomas (Tammy) Anderson. When she turned seventeen, she married James (Jeemie) Balfour, a fisherman and blacksmith. Balfour gave birth to seven sons and four daughters.

Her work as a howdie meant people travelled to see her from afar. And vice versa. On one notable occasion, her husband rowed her to Muckle Röe. The mother's labour was putting her life and that of her baby in jeopardy so Jeemie Balfour used his smithing skills to fashion a pair of forceps which Elizabeth Balfour used to save both mother and child. The first ever delivery of its kind in the area.

Balfour experienced her own loss however. She lost a daughter to whooping cough, age 4, while a son, grandson and daughter-in-law died of consumption. She also had a dream of her son Walter and correctly identified where his body was found after he drowned trying to retrieve an oar. Then in 1886, her husband and two sons were lost at sea.

== Later life and death ==
Balfour suffered a stroke which left her bed-bound for the last five years of her life. She died on 18 March 1918.
