= Haddington (Parliament of Scotland constituency) =

Haddington was a royal burgh that returned one commissioner to the Parliament of Scotland and to the Convention of Estates.

After the Acts of Union 1707, Haddington, North Berwick, Dunbar, Jedburgh and Lauder formed the Haddington district of burghs, returning one member between them to the House of Commons of Great Britain.

== List of burgh commissioners ==
- 1661–63, 1665 convention, 1667 convention: William Seton, provost
- 1669–74: John Hay, sheriff-depute of East Lothian
- 1678 (convention): William Lamb, merchant, bailie
- 1681–82: Harie Cockburn, merchant, provost
- 1685–86, 1689 (convention), 1689: John Sleich, provost (died c.1689)
- 1690–95: James Lauder, baillie (died c.1695)
- 1696–1701, 1702–07: Alexander Edgar, former provost

== See also ==
- List of constituencies in the Parliament of Scotland at the time of the Union
