= Roderick Balfour, 5th Earl of Balfour =

British peer (born 1948)

The Right Honourable The Earl of Balfour
- Predecessor: Gerald Balfour, 4th Earl of Balfour
- Born: Roderick Arthur Francis Balfour; 9 December 1948 (age 77); London, England
- Spouse: Lady Tessa Fitzalan-Howard (m. 1971)
- Issue: Lady Willa Franks; Lady Kinvara Balfour; Lady Maria Wigan; Lady Candida Balfour
- Parents: Eustace Balfour; Anne Yule

Roderick Arthur Francis Balfour, 5th Earl of Balfour (born 9 December 1948), is a British peer and businessman. He is the great-grandnephew of Arthur Balfour, who was prime minister and later foreign secretary who drafted the Balfour Declaration of 1917.

== Biography ==
Balfour was born on 9 December 1948 in London to Eustace Balfour and Anne (née Yule). Eustace Balfour was the son of Francis Balfour, nephew of Prime Minister Arthur Balfour, the first Earl of Balfour. He was educated at Eton College.

In 1971, Balfour married Lady Tessa Fitzalan-Howard, eldest daughter of Miles Fitzalan-Howard, 17th Duke of Norfolk. They have four children:

- Lady Willa Anne Balfour (b. 1973)
- Lady Kinvara Clare Rachel Balfour (b. June 1975)
- Lady Maria Alice Jubilee Balfour (b. 1977)
- Lady Candida Rose Balfour (b. 1984)

On 27 June 2003, Balfour succeeded his second cousin once removed Gerald as the Earl of Balfour. As he has no sons, his brother, Charles, is the heir presumptive.

== Arms ==
Coat of arms of Roderick Balfour, 5th Earl of Balfour
Crest A palm tree proper. Escutcheon Argent, on a chevron engrailed between three mullets sable as many otters’ heads erased of the field. Supporters Two otters proper, collared or. Motto Virtus ad æthera tendit (Virtue strives toward heaven).

Peerage of the United Kingdom
Preceded by Gerald Balfour	Earl of Balfour; 2003–present	Incumbent; Heir presumptive: Hon. Charles Balfour
