= North Berwick (Parliament of Scotland constituency) =

North Berwick in Haddingtonshire was a royal burgh that returned one commissioner to the Parliament of Scotland and to the Convention of Estates.

After the Acts of Union 1707, North Berwick, Dunbar, Haddington, Jedburgh and Lauder formed the Haddington district of burghs, returning one member between them to the House of Commons of Great Britain.

== List of burgh commissioners ==
- 1639–41, 1643–44, 1644–45: George Home of Wedderburn
- 1649–51: John Levington
- 1661-63: Adam Maxwell, merchant-burgess
- 1665 convention: George Trotter
- 1667 convention: not represented
- 1669–74: Sir Andrew Ramsay of Abbotshall
- 1678 convention, 1681–82, 1685–86: Charles Maitland, merchant-burgess, bailie
- 1689 convention, 1689–98: Sir Thomas Steuart of Coltness (died 1698)
- 1698–1702: Sir Robert Stewart of Allanbank
- 1702–07: Sir Hew Dalrymple of North Berwick

== See also ==
- List of constituencies in the Parliament of Scotland at the time of the Union
