= Sir Hew Dalrymple, 2nd Baronet =

Scottish politician (1712-1790)

Sir Hew (or Hugh) Dalrymple, 2nd Baronet, Lord Drummore (12 March 1712 – 24 November 1790) was a Scottish politician and MP.

He was the eldest son of Sir Robert Dalrymple, who died on 21 August 1734, predeceasing his father. Sir Hew thus inherited the baronetcy of his grandfather, Hew Dalrymple, Lord North Berwick, on the latter's death in 1737. His brother, John Dalrymple, later Hamilton, was also an MP.

He served on two occasions as MP for Haddington Burghs, between 1742 and 1747 and again between 1761 and 1768, and was also MP for Haddingtonshire between 1747 and 1761.

He was appointed King's Remembrancer in the Scottish Exchequer in 1768, holding the post to 1770.

He married twice; firstly Margaret, the daughter of London surgeon Peter Sainthill, with whom he had two sons and secondly Martha, the daughter of Charles Edwin of Lincoln's Inn. He was succeeded by his eldest son Hew, who later changed his name to Hamilton-Dalrymple.

== Citations ==
Parliament of Great Britain
| Preceded by James Fall | Member of Parliament for Haddington Burghs; 1742–1747 | Succeeded by Andrew Fletcher |
| Preceded by Lord Charles Hay | Member of Parliament for Haddingtonshire; 1747–1761 | Succeeded by Andrew Fletcher |
| Preceded by Andrew Fletcher | Member of Parliament for Haddington Burghs; 1761–1768 | Succeeded by Patrick Warrender |
Baronetage of Nova Scotia
| Preceded by Hew Dalrymple | Baronet (of Bargeny); 1737–1790 | Succeeded by Hew Dalrymple |
