= Gerald Balfour, 4th Earl of Balfour =

The Right Honourable The Earl of Balfour

Member of the House of Lords
- Lord Temporal
- In office 28 November 1968 – 11 November 1999 as a hereditary peer
- Preceded by: The 3rd Earl of Balfour
- Succeeded by: Seat abolished (Note: Pursuant to the House of Lords Act 1999.)

Personal details
- Born: Gerald Arthur James Balfour; 23 December 1925 Whittingehame, East Lothian, Scotland
- Died: 27 June 2003 (aged 77) Dunbar, Scotland
- Spouse: Natasha Georgina Anton (m. 1956; died 1994)
- Parent(s): Robert Balfour, 3rd Earl of Balfour; Jean Lily West Roundel Cooke-Yarborough

Gerald Arthur James Balfour, 4th Earl of Balfour (23 December 1925 – 27 June 2003), styled Viscount Traprain between 1945 and 1968, was a British peer.

Balfour was the son of the 3rd Earl of Balfour and Jean Lily West Roundel Cooke-Yarborough. He married Natasha Georgina Anton (d. 1994), daughter of Captain George Anton, on 14 December 1956.

Balfour was educated at Eton. He took part in the Second World War, in the Merchant Navy. A master mariner, he first served on HMS Conway. From 1960 to 1974, he was a County Councillor for East Lothian. In November 1968 he succeeded his father in the earldom.

As Balfour and his wife had no children, Balfour was succeeded in the earldom by his second cousin once removed, Roderick Balfour.

== Arms ==
Coat of arms of Gerald Balfour, 4th Earl of Balfour
Crest A palm tree proper. Escutcheon Argent, on a chevron engrailed between three mullets sable as many otters’ heads erased of the field. Supporters Two otters proper, collared or. Motto Virtus ad æthera tendit (Virtue strives toward heaven).

== Notes ==
Peerage of the United Kingdom
Preceded by Robert Balfour	Earl of Balfour; 1968–2003; Member of the House of Lords (1968–1999)	Succeeded by Roderick Balfour
