= Lauder (Parliament of Scotland constituency) =

Lauder in Berwickshire was a royal burgh that returned one commissioner to the Parliament of Scotland and to the Convention of Estates.

After the Acts of Union 1707, Lauder, North Berwick, Dunbar, Haddington and Jedburgh formed the Haddington district of burghs, returning one member between them to the House of Commons of Great Britain.

== List of burgh commissioners ==
- 1661: Thomas Wood, bailie
- 1665 convention: Robert Wood, bailie
- 1667 convention, 1669: John Maitland, bailie
- 1670–74: Thomas Wood, bailie
- 1678 convention, 1685–86: Alexander Home
- 1681–82: Charles Lauder of Park, merchant
- 1689 convention, 1689–1702: David Maitland of Soutra
- 1702–07: Sir David Cunynghame of Milncraig

== See also ==
- List of constituencies in the Parliament of Scotland at the time of the Union
