= James Maitland Balfour =

British politician

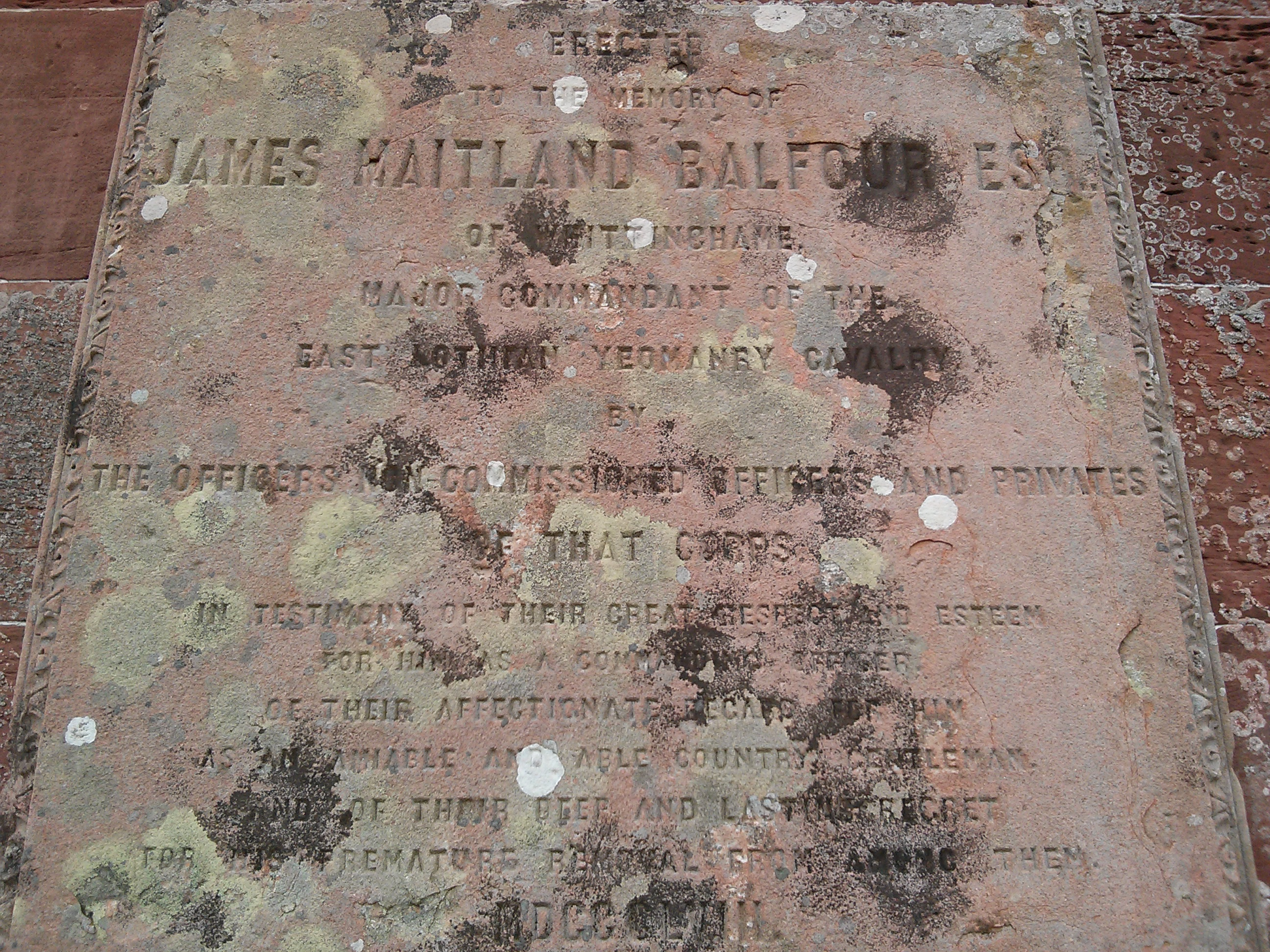
- from his memorial
- Born: 5 January 1820; United Kingdom
- Died: 23 February 1856 (aged 36); Funchal, Madeira
- Spouse: Lady Blanche Gascoyne-Cecil
- Children: 8, including Eleanor, Arthur, Alice, Francis, Gerald, and Eustace
- Parent(s): James Balfour; Lady Eleanor Maitland

James Maitland Balfour (5 January 1820 – 23 February 1856) was a Scottish land-owner and businessman. He made a fortune in the 19th-century railway boom, and inherited a significant portion of his father's great wealth.

He was a Conservative Member of Parliament in the 1840s, and was the father of Prime Minister Arthur Balfour, 1st Earl of Balfour.

== Life ==
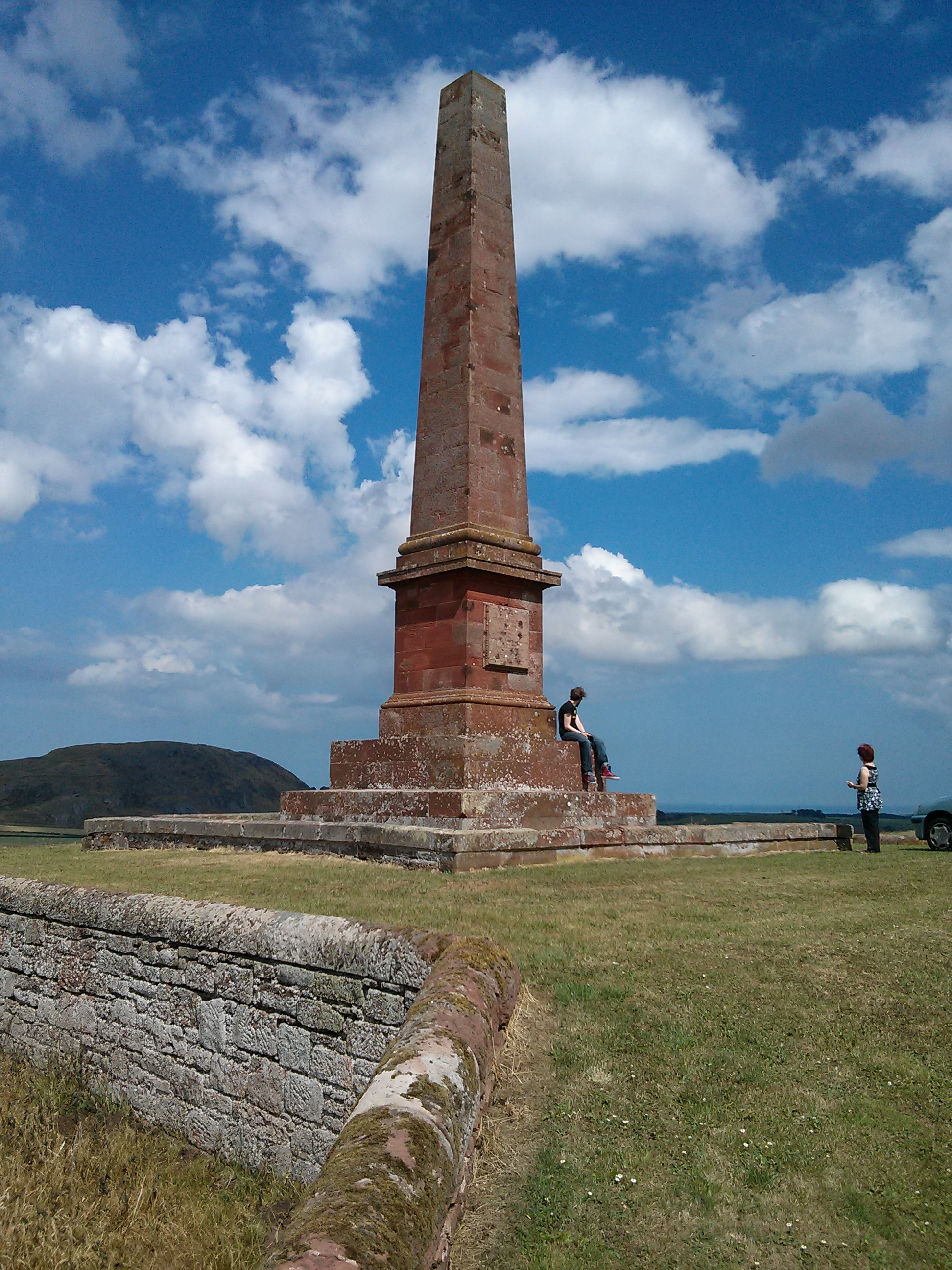
The Balfour monument

Balfour was the son of James Balfour and his wife Lady Eleanor, daughter of James Maitland, 8th Earl of Lauderdale. He was educated at Eton College and Trinity College, Cambridge.

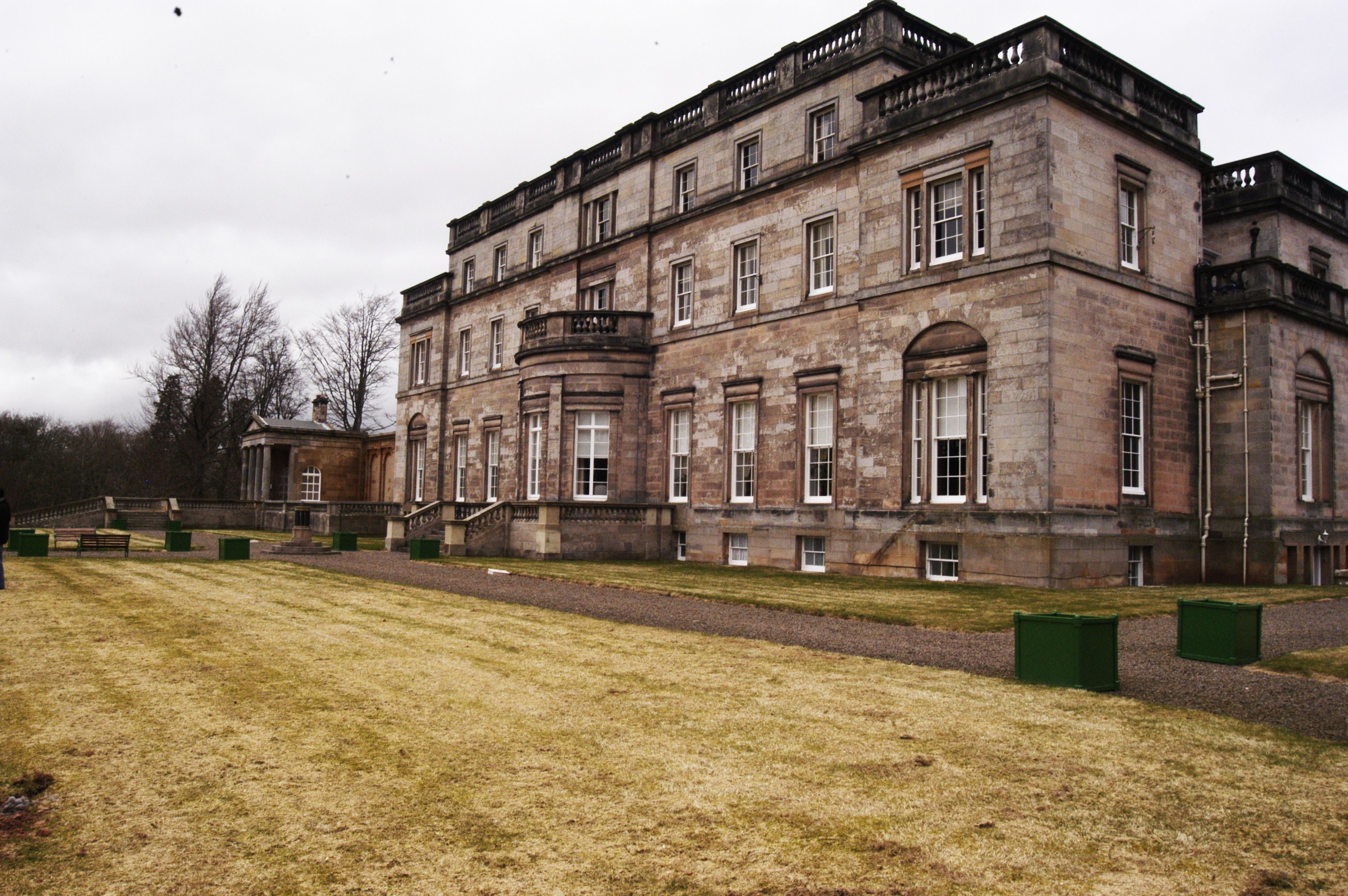
Whittingehame House

Balfour inherited his father's neo-classical mansion Whittingehame House and his Highland estate in Ross-shire, as well as a house in Grosvenor Square, London. He also inherited his father's business skills, and became a director of the North British Railway at the height of the railway mania, which earned him a fortune.

He served as Member of Parliament for Haddington from 1841 until 1847 and was also Major Commandant of the East Lothian Yeomanry Cavalry, who erected the Balfour Monument in his honour overlooking Traprain Law, 2 1/2 miles (4.0 km) south west of East Linton in Scotland.

Balfour married Lady Blanche Mary Harriet Gascoyne-Cecil, daughter of James Gascoyne-Cecil, 2nd Marquess of Salisbury, on 15 August 1843 (her brother Robert later became Prime Minister of the United Kingdom). They had eight children, five sons and three daughters:

- Eleanor Mildred Balfour (1845–1936), who married Henry Sidgwick and was Principal of Newnham College, Cambridge
- Evelyn Georgiana Mary Balfour (1846/7–1934), married John William Strutt, 3rd Baron Rayleigh
- Arthur James Balfour, 1st Earl of Balfour (1848–1930), Conservative politician and Prime Minister of the United Kingdom from 1902 to 1905
- Cecil Charles Balfour (1849–1881)
- Alice Blanche Balfour (1850–1936), an entomologist, geneticist, naturalist and scientific illustrator.
- Francis Maitland Balfour (1851–1882), Professor of Animal Morphology at the University of Cambridge
- Gerald William Balfour, 2nd Earl of Balfour (1853–1945), Conservative politician who served as Chief Secretary for Ireland and President of the Board of Trade
- Colonel Eustace James Anthony Balfour (1854–1911), an architect who served as ADC to King Edward VII. His wife Lady Frances Balfour was a leading suffragist.

Balfour died of tuberculosis on 23 February 1856 in Funchal, Madeira, aged 36. Lady Blanche Balfour died in 1872.

Parliament of the United Kingdom
Preceded by Robert Steuart	Member of Parliament for Haddington Burghs; 1841—1847	Succeeded by Sir Henry Ferguson Davie
