= Patrick Warrender =

Scottish soldier and politician

Sir Patrick Warrender of Lochend, 3rd Baronet (7 March 1731 – 14 June 1799) was a Scottish soldier and politician.

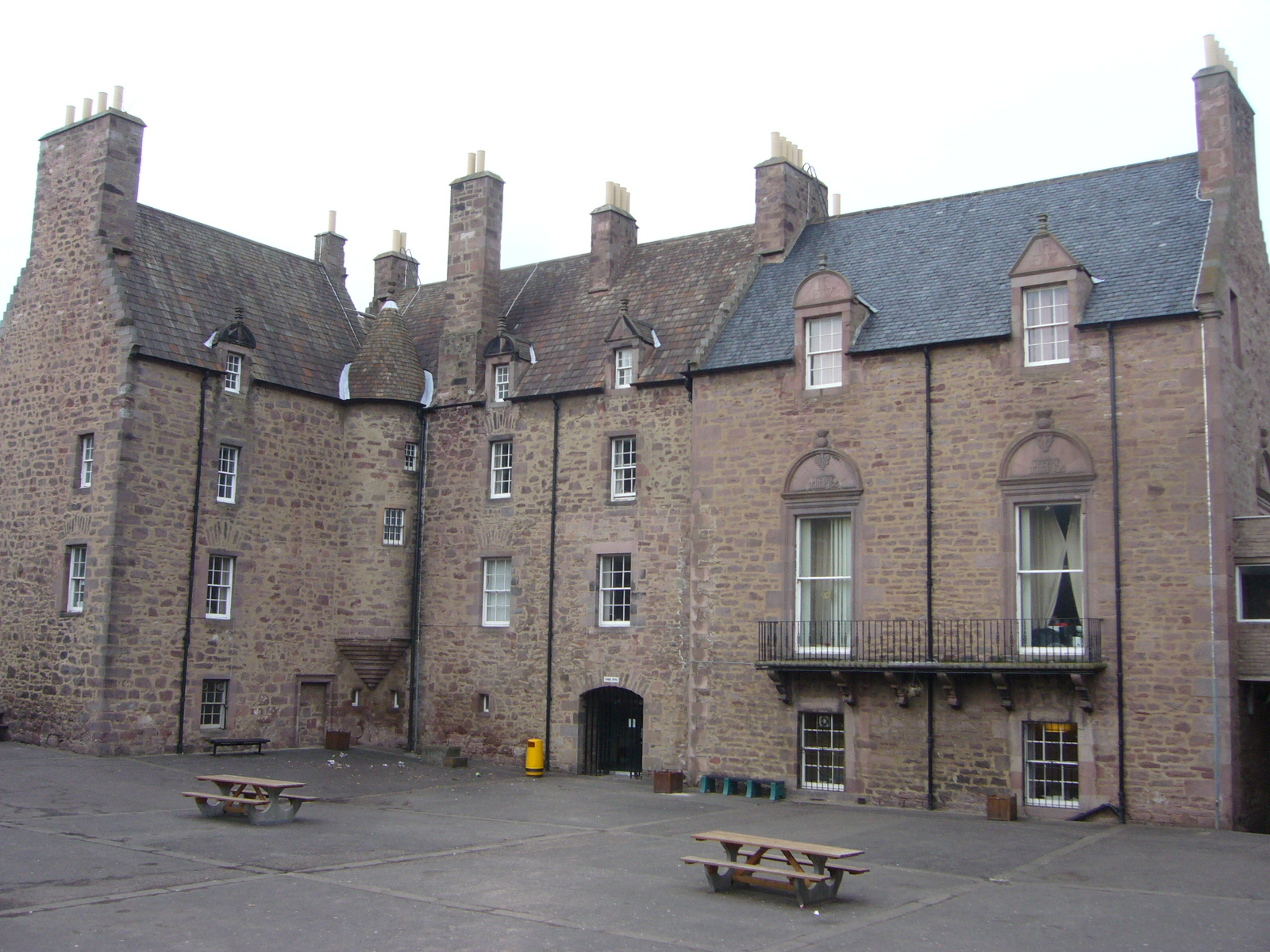
Bruntsfield House, Edinburgh – the Warrenders' Edinburgh house

He was a younger, but oldest surviving, son of Sir John Warrender, 2nd Baronet and his wife Henrietta Johnston, daughter of Sir Patrick Johnston MP, Lord Provost of Edinburgh. In 1772, he succeeded his father as baronet. Warrender served with the Royal Horse Guards and fought in the Battle of Minden in 1759. Eventually he became a Lieutenant-Colonel of the 11th Regiment of Dragoons.

Warrender was Member of Parliament (MP) for Haddington Burghs from 1768 until 1774. Between 1771 and 1791, he was King's Remembrancer of the Court of Exchequer.

In 1780, Warrender married Helen Blair. They had a daughter and two sons, George and John, who succeeded to the baronetcy successively.

Parliament of Great Britain
Preceded by Sir Hew Dalrymple	Member of Parliament for Haddington Burghs; 1768–1774	Succeeded by John Maitland
Baronetage of Great Britain
Preceded by John Warrender	Baronet (of Lochend); 1772–1799	Succeeded by George Warrender
