= Alice Blanche Balfour =

British entomologist, geneticist, (1850–1936)

Alice Blanche Balfour FRES
- Born: 20 October 1850; Whittingehame House, East Lothian, Scotland
- Died: 12 June 1936 (aged 85); Whittingehame House, East Lothian, Scotland
- Parent(s): James Maitland Balfour; Lady Blanche Gascoyne-Cecil
- Scientific career
- Fields: Entomology, genetics

Alice Blanche Balfour FRES (20 October 1850 – 12 June 1936) was a Scottish entomologist, naturalist, scientific illustrator and one of the earliest pioneers in the science of genetics. Her extensive collection of Scottish moths is now in the care of National Museums Scotland.

== Life ==
Balfour was born on 20 October 1850 at Whittingehame House in East Lothian, the daughter of Lady Blanche Gascoyne-Cecil (1825–1872) and James Maitland Balfour. She lived much of her adult life in London with her brother Arthur Balfour, 1st Earl of Balfour who was Prime Minister of the United Kingdom from 1902 to 1905. Her brother Francis Maitland Balfour was elected a Fellow of the Royal Society at the age of 27 for his work on embryology.

She developed a lifelong interest in entomology and later developed an interest in genetics and in particular the way that the patterns in zebra skins were inherited. She had a lengthy correspondence with James Cossar Ewart Professor of Zoology at University of Edinburgh who himself had a professional interest in the development of the horse. The correspondence relates to the possibility of cross-breeding zebra with horses to reduce the impact of tsetse fly on horses in Africa.

In 1895 she published the book Twelve Hundred miles in a Waggon which describes a trip taken by herself, H. W. Fitzwilliam, Albert Grey and his wife, and Albert Grey's cousin George Grey.

She was elected a Fellow of the Royal Entomological Society of London on 7 June 1916.

Balfour died on 12 June 1936 at Wittingehame House.

In 1936, her collection of over 10,000 moths, along with her catalogues and notebooks, was donated to National Museums Scotland. It is being used today, to study how the distribution of moths in Scotland have changed over time.

Alice's contributions to entomology were celebrated during Women's History month 2023, in an article in The Scotsman magazine.
