= 28th Light Dragoons =

British regiment from 1799 to 1802

The 28th Light Dragoons or the 28th (Duke of York's Own) Regiment of Light Dragoons was a cavalry regiment of the British Army. It was raised in March 1795 March, by Sir Robert Laurie. However, from September 1799 the colonel of the regiment was Miles Staveley. The regiment had a short life being disbanded in 1802 while serving in Ireland.
