= Francis Maitland Balfour =

British biologist (1851–1882)

Frank Balfour
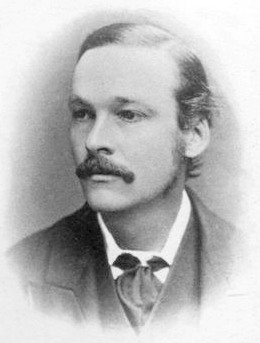
- Born: Francis Maitland Balfour; 10 November 1851; Edinburgh, Scotland
- Died: 19 July 1882 (aged 30); Aiguille Blanche de Peuterey, Italy
- Parent(s): James Maitland Balfour; Lady Blanche Gascoyne-Cecil
- Relatives: Arthur, Gerald, brothers
- Awards: Royal Medal (1881)
- Scientific career
- Fields: embryology
- Workplaces: Trinity College, Cambridge

Francis Maitland Balfour, known as F. M. Balfour, FRS (10 November 1851 – 19 July 1882) was a British biologist. He lost his life while attempting the ascent of Mont Blanc. He was regarded by his colleagues as one of the greatest biologists of his day and Charles Darwin's successor.

== Life ==
He was the son of James Maitland Balfour and Lady Blanche Gascoyne-Cecil. His father was a Scottish MP, as was his grandfather James; his mother, a member of the Cecil family descended from Robert Cecil, 1st Earl of Salisbury, was the daughter of the 2nd Marquess of Salisbury and a sister of the 3rd Marquess, the future prime minister.

The younger brother of politician Arthur Balfour (Prime Minister of the United Kingdom, 1902-1905), he was born at Edinburgh in Scotland. He attended Harrow School, where he tied with Arthur Evans, the future archaeologist of Knossos, for the Natural History Prize. George Griffith, a teacher at Harrow, encouraged and aided him in the pursuit of natural science, a taste for which, especially geology, he had acquired from his mother. Entering Trinity College, Cambridge, in 1870, he was elected a natural science scholar of his college in the following year, and obtained second place in the Natural Science Tripos of December 1873.

In 1873 and 185 he tramped over Lapland, Finland, and Sweden with Arthur Evans, who was a close friend from Harrow School. He was a member of the Alpine club and had climbed in the Alps with his brother Gerald.

== Career ==
A course of lectures on embryology, delivered by Sir Michael Foster in 1871, turned Balfour's attention to animal morphology. After the tripos, he was selected to occupy one of the two seats allocated to the University of Cambridge at the Naples zoological station. The research work which he began there contributed in an important degree to his election as a Fellow of Trinity in 1874; and also gave him the material for a series of papers (published as a monograph in 1878) on the Elasmobranch fish, which threw new light on the development of several organs in the Vertebrates, in particular of the uro-genital and nervous systems.

His next work was a large treatise, Comparative Embryology, in two volumes; the first, published in 1880, dealing with the Invertebrates, and the second (1881) with the Vertebrates. This book displayed a vigorous scientific imagination, controlled by a logical sense that rigidly distinguished between fact and hypothesis, and it quickly won wide recognition, both as an admirable digest of the numberless observations made with regard to the development of animals during the quarter of a century preceding its publication, and as a work of original research.

Balfour's reputation was now such that other universities became anxious to secure his services, and he was invited to succeed Professor George Rolleston at Oxford and Sir Wyville Thomson at Edinburgh. Although he was only a college lecturer, holding no official post in his university, he declined to leave Cambridge, and in the spring of 1882 the university instituted a special Chair of Animal Morphology for his benefit.

He was a committed Darwinian, though he disagreed with Darwin on the origins of larvae. Darwin assumed that larvae arose from the same stock as adults, but Balfour believed that virtually all larvae are 'secondary', i.e., they "have become introduced into the ontogeny of species, the young of which were originally hatched with all the characters of the adult". In the case of echinoderms, he argued that the bilateral larvae must have been introduced after the establishment of the existing classes, and he challenged Ernst Haeckel's view that these larvae are evidence that echinoderms evolved from bilateral ancestors.

In June 1878 Balfour was elected a Fellow of the Royal Society, and in 1881 was awarded their Royal Medal "For his numerous and important contributions to animal morphology; and more especially for his investigations respecting the origin of the urogenital organs and the cerebrospinal nerves of the Vertebrata; and for his work on the development of the Elasmobranch fishes."

At the time of his death, he was a professor of animal morphology at the University of Cambridge.

== Death ==
Balfour never delivered a lecture in his new position. In the first term after his appointment he was prevented from working by an attack of typhoid fever, and went to the Alps for his health. Balfour and the guide Johann Petrus were killed, probably on 19 July 1882, attempting the ascent of the Aiguille Blanche, Mont Blanc, at that time unscaled.

Besides being a brilliant morphologist, Balfour was an accomplished naturalist. Charles Darwin referred to him as the "English Cuvier". Huxley thought he was "the only man who can carry out my work", and that the deaths of Balfour and W. K. Clifford were "the greatest loss to science in our time". He was buried at Whittingehame, East Lothian.

== Selected publications ==
- The Elements of Embryology (1874) [with Michael Foster]
- A Treatise on Comparative Embryology (Volume 1, Volume 2, 1880–1881)
