= Henry Ferguson Davie =

British Army general

Ferguson's Naturalization Act 1823
- Act of Parliament
- Parliament of the United Kingdom
- Long title: An Act for naturalizing Henry Robert Ferguson.
- Citation: 4 Geo. 4 c. 39 Pr.

Dates
- Royal assent: 27 June 1823

An armorial hatchment for Henry Robert Ferguson Davie, 1st Bt., displaying his arms (Arms of Davie of Creedy in the parish of Sandford, Devon: Argent, a chevron sable between three mullets pierced gules. Quartered with arms of Davie of Creedy, near Crediton, Devon: Azure, three cinquefoils or on a chief of the last a lion passant gules) impaling his wife's arms as a version of Davie of Creedy

General Sir Henry Robert Ferguson Davie, 1st Baronet, DL (1797 – 30 November 1885), known as Henry Ferguson until 1846, of Creedy Park, Sandford, Devon, was Liberal Member of Parliament for Haddington in East Lothian, Scotland, 1847 to 1878 and an army officer.

He was born in Rome, the son of Robert Ferguson of Fife. He joined the British Army in 1818. He rose through the ranks as follows: Lieutenant (1819), Captain (1822), Major (1826), Lieutenant Colonel (1828), Colonel (1841), Major General (1854), Lieutenant General (1860) and General (1866).

He was appointed Colonel of the 73rd (Perthshire) Regiment of Foot on 17 February 1865. The regiment became the Second Battalion, The Black Watch in 1881, and the general served as Colonel of the Battalion until his death.

Ferguson's Naturalization Act 1846
- Act of Parliament
- Parliament of the United Kingdom
- Long title: An Act to repeal so much of an Act passed in Ferguson's the fourth year of the reign of his late Majesty King George the Fourth, intituled, "An Act for naturalizing Henry Robert Ferguson," as enacts that the said Henry Robert Ferguson should not thereby be enabled to be of the Privy Council, or a Member of either House of Parliament, or to take any Office or Place of Trust either Civil or Military, or to have any Grant of Lands, Tenements or Hereditaments from the Crown to Himself, or any other Person or Persons in Trust for him.
- Citation: 9 & 10 Vict. c. 44 Pr.

Dates
- Royal assent: 30 March 1846

In 1823, he married Frances Juliana Davie, daughter of Sir John Davie, 9th Baronet, of Creedy, and niece and heiress of Sir Humphrey Davie, 10th and last Baronet, of Creedy. In 1846 he assumed by royal licence the additional surname of Davie and on 9 January 1847 the baronetcy held by his wife's family was revived when he was created a Baronet, of Creedy in the County of Devon. Having been born abroad, he was naturalized as a British subject by a private act of Parliament, Ferguson's Naturalization Act 1823 (4 Geo. 4 c. 39 Pr.); the act was amended by Ferguson's Naturalization Act 1846 (9 & 10 Vict. c. 44 Pr.) to allow him to sit in Parliament.

He had six children, amongst whom John (born 1830), a Grenadier Guards officer, succeeded to the Baronetcy in 1885 and Charles Robert (born 1836) was Rector of Yelverton, Norfolk.

He was a Deputy Lieutenant of Devonshire and Somerset and lived at Creedy Park in Crediton, Devon.

Parliament of the United Kingdom
| Preceded by James Maitland Balfour | Member of Parliament for Haddington; 1847–1878 | Succeeded by Lord William Hay |
Baronetage of the United Kingdom
| New creation | Baronet (of Creedy); 1847–1885 | Succeeded by John Davie Ferguson Davie |
