= Sir Hew Dalrymple, 3rd Baronet =

British army officer & politician (1746-1800)

Sir Hew Dalrymple, 3rd Baronet (26 October 1746 – 13 February 1800) was the Member of Parliament (MP) for Haddingtonshire 1780–1786.

== Early life ==
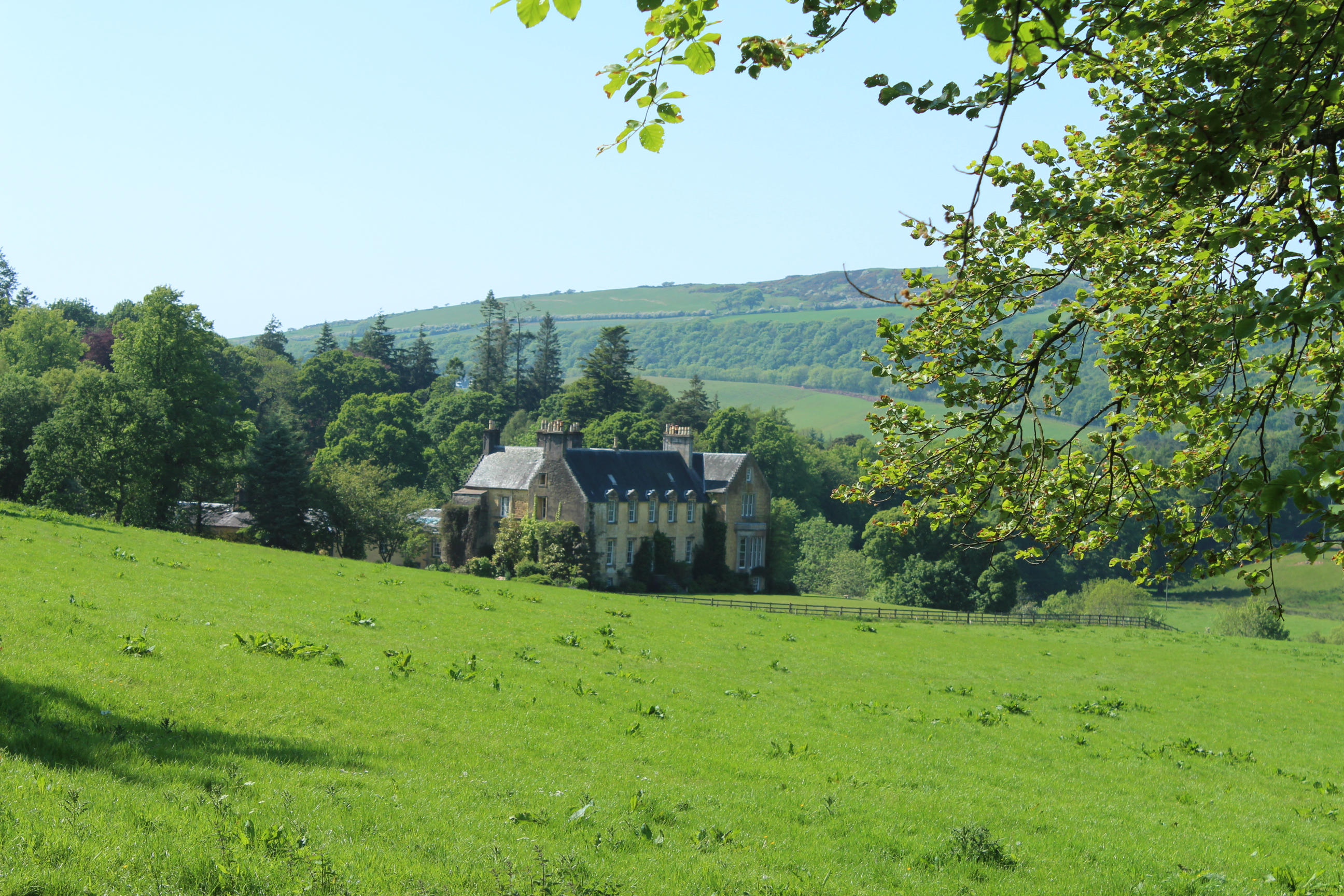
Bargany House

He was the son of Sir Hew Dalrymple, 2nd Baronet. He succeeded his father to the baronetcy in 1790.

== Career ==
He was an army officer, serving as an ensign in the 31st Foot from 1763, a captain in the 1st Foot from 1768, and the 92nd Foot from 1779.

He stepped down as MP in 1786, when he was appointed Auditor of the Excise in Scotland 1786, holding this post until his death. He changed his name to Hamilton-Dalrymple in 1796 when he inherited the estate of Bargany from his uncle, John Hamilton (formerly Dalrymple).

== Personal life ==
He married in 1770 his cousin Janet, the daughter of William Duff of Crombie, sheriff depute of Ayrshire, and had eight sons and four daughters, including Janet Dalrymple (wife of Robert Haldane-Duncan, 1st Earl of Camperdown). He was succeeded by his eldest surviving son, Sir Hew Dalrymple-Hamilton, 4th Baronet.

Parliament of Great Britain
Preceded by William Hamilton Nisbet	Member of Parliament for Haddingtonshire; 1780–1786	Succeeded by John Hamilton
Baronetage of Nova Scotia
Preceded by Hew Dalrymple	Baronet (of Bargeny); 1790–1800	Succeeded by Hew Dalrymple-Hamilton
