= Gerald Balfour, 2nd Earl of Balfour =

British politician (1853–1945)

The Right Honourable The Earl of Balfour PC
- Balfour, c. 1893-1903

President of the Board of Trade
- In office 12 November 1900 – 14 March 1905
- Monarchs: Victoria; Edward VII
- Prime Minister: The Marquess of Salisbury; Arthur Balfour
- Preceded by: Charles Ritchie
- Succeeded by: The Marquess of Salisbury

President of the Local Government Board
- In office 14 March 1905 – 4 December 1905
- Monarch: Edward VII
- Prime Minister: Arthur Balfour
- Preceded by: Walter Long
- Succeeded by: John Burns

Chief Secretary for Ireland
- In office 21 June 1895 – 9 November 1900
- Monarch: Victoria
- Prime Minister: The Marquess of Salisbury
- Preceded by: John Morley
- Succeeded by: George Wyndham

Member of the House of Lords Lord Temporal
- In office 19 March 1930 – 14 January 1945 as a hereditary peer
- Preceded by: The 1st Earl of Balfour
- Succeeded by: The 3rd Earl of Balfour

Member of Parliament for Leeds Central
- In office 18 December 1885 – 8 February 1906
- Preceded by: Constituency created
- Succeeded by: Robert Armitage

Personal details
- Born: Gerald William Balfour; 9 April 1853 Edinburgh, Scotland
- Died: 14 January 1945 (aged 91) Whittingehame, Scotland
- Party: Conservative
- Spouse: Lady Betty Bulwer-Lytton (m. 1887; died 1942)
- Children: 7 (including Eve and Robert, 3rd Earl of Balfour)
- Parent(s): James Maitland Balfour; Lady Blanche Gascoyne-Cecil
- Education: Trinity College, Cambridge

Gerald William Balfour, 2nd Earl of Balfour, PC (9 April 1853 – 14 January 1945), known as Gerald Balfour or The Rt Hon. G. W. Balfour until 1930, was a senior British Conservative politician who became a peer on the death of his brother, former prime minister Arthur Balfour, in 1930.

== Background and education ==
Balfour was born in Edinburgh on 9 April 1853, the fourth son of James Maitland Balfour, of Whittingehame, Haddingtonshire, and Lady Blanche Cecil, daughter of James Gascoyne-Cecil, 2nd Marquess of Salisbury. Two Prime Ministers were immediate relations: Arthur Balfour, 1st Earl of Balfour, his elder brother, and Lord Salisbury, his uncle. He was educated at Eton and at Trinity College, Cambridge, where he gained 1st Class Honours in the Classical Tripos.

== Political career ==
Balfour sat as Conservative Member of Parliament for Leeds Central from 1885 to 1906. During this time he was a member of Commission on Labour, and private secretary to his brother, Arthur Balfour, when he was president of the Local Government Board from 1885 to 1886. He served as Chief Secretary for Ireland from 1895 to 1900, as president of the Board of Trade from 1900 to 1905 and as president of the Local Government Board in 1905. He was admitted to the Privy Council of Ireland in 1895, and to the Privy Council of the United Kingdom in 1905.

After losing his seat in the House of Commons in the Liberal landslide of 1906, he was chairman of the Commission on Lighthouse Administration in 1908, and chairman of the Cambridge Committee of the Commission on Oxford and Cambridge Universities. He succeeded his brother Arthur as second Earl of Balfour in 1930, according to a special remainder in the letters patent and took a seat in the House of Lords.

== Personal life and academic honours ==
During his first spell at the Houses of Parliament, Balfour received an honorary LLD from Cambridge University, and was a fellow of Trinity.

From 1901 Balfour lived at Fisher's Hill House, a large home which he had built by Lutyens in Hook Heath, Woking, Surrey, also living in the rural hamlet by 1911 was Alfred Lyttelton (Lib. U.), Secretary of State for the Colonies (1903–1905) who married into his wider family and the Duke of Sutherland.

Balfour was interested in parapsychology. He was President of the Society for Psychical Research (1906–1907).

== Marriage and children ==
Lord Balfour married Lady Elizabeth Edith "Betty" Bulwer-Lytton, daughter of the 1st Earl of Lytton, former Viceroy of India, in 1887. They had six children:

- Lady Eleanor Balfour (1890 – d. after 1980)
- Lady Ruth Balfour (d. 30 August 1967)
- Mary Edith Balfour (21 January 1894 – 1980)
- Lady Evelyn Barbara "Eve" Balfour (16 July 1898 – 1990)
- Robert Arthur Lytton Balfour, 3rd Earl of Balfour (31 December 1902 – 28 November 1968)
- Lady Kathleen Constance Blanche Balfour (1912 – 20 August 1996).

An affair with Welsh Liberal politician Winifred Coombe Tennant resulted in a further child, Augustus Henry.

The Countess of Balfour died in 1942, aged 74. Lord Balfour survived her by three years and died at Whittingehame on 14 January 1945, aged 91, by which time he was the last surviving member of any of long-serving prime minister Salisbury's cabinets. He was succeeded in the earldom by his only son Robert.

== Arms ==
Coat of arms of Gerald Balfour, 2nd Earl of Balfour
Crest A palm tree proper. Escutcheon Argent, on a chevron engrailed between three mullets sable as many otters’ heads erased of the field. Supporters Two otters proper, collared or. Motto Virtus ad æthera tendit (Virtue strives toward heaven).

Parliament of the United Kingdom
New constituency	Member of Parliament for Leeds Central; 1885–1906	Succeeded by Robert Armitage
Political offices
Preceded by John Morley	Chief Secretary for Ireland; 1895–1900	Succeeded by George Wyndham
Preceded by Charles Ritchie	President of the Board of Trade; 1900–1905	Succeeded by The Marquess of Salisbury
Preceded by Walter Long	President of the Local Government Board; 1905	Succeeded by John Burns
Peerage of the United Kingdom
Preceded by Arthur Balfour	Earl of Balfour; 1930–1945; Member of the House of Lords (1930–1945)	Succeeded by Robert Balfour
