= Agnes McDouall =

Scottish botanist (1838–1926)

- Born: Agnes Buchan-Hepburn; 27 September 1838
- Died: 15 March 1926 (aged 87)
- Known for: Scottish gardener and plant collector
- Father: Sir Thomas Buchan-Hepburn

Agnes McDouall (n. Buchan-Hepburn) (27 September 1838 – 15 March 1926) was a Scottish gardener and plant collector.

== Biography ==
Agnes was the daughter of Helen Little and Sir Thomas Buchan-Hepburn as the second of five children. After the birth into a family of keen gardeners and plant collectors at Smeaton Hepburn, East Linton, her father extended the forests by introducing new conifers that were found by Scottish plant hunters like Robert Fortune and David Douglas.

In 1869, she married a landowner James McDouall and relocated to his historic family estate at Logan, close to Stranraer. She brought her own collection of roses, lilies, and shrubs, along with the connections with plant hunters. The plant collection at Logan was later to become famous under her sons, Kenneth and Douglas's management.

== Achievements ==
She was the first one who grew delicate exotic plants in the garden, and she is also credited with starting the collection of Southern Hemisphere species by planting Logan's first eucalyptus tree, Eucalyptus urnigera, beneath the ruin of Castle Balzieland in the walled garden (now is called the Logan Botanic Garden) which became a part of the Royal Botanic Garden Edinburgh. In 1969, Agnes's tree was cut down in 1994 due to safety concerns.
