= Tirpitz Plan =

Imperial German Navy expansion Plan

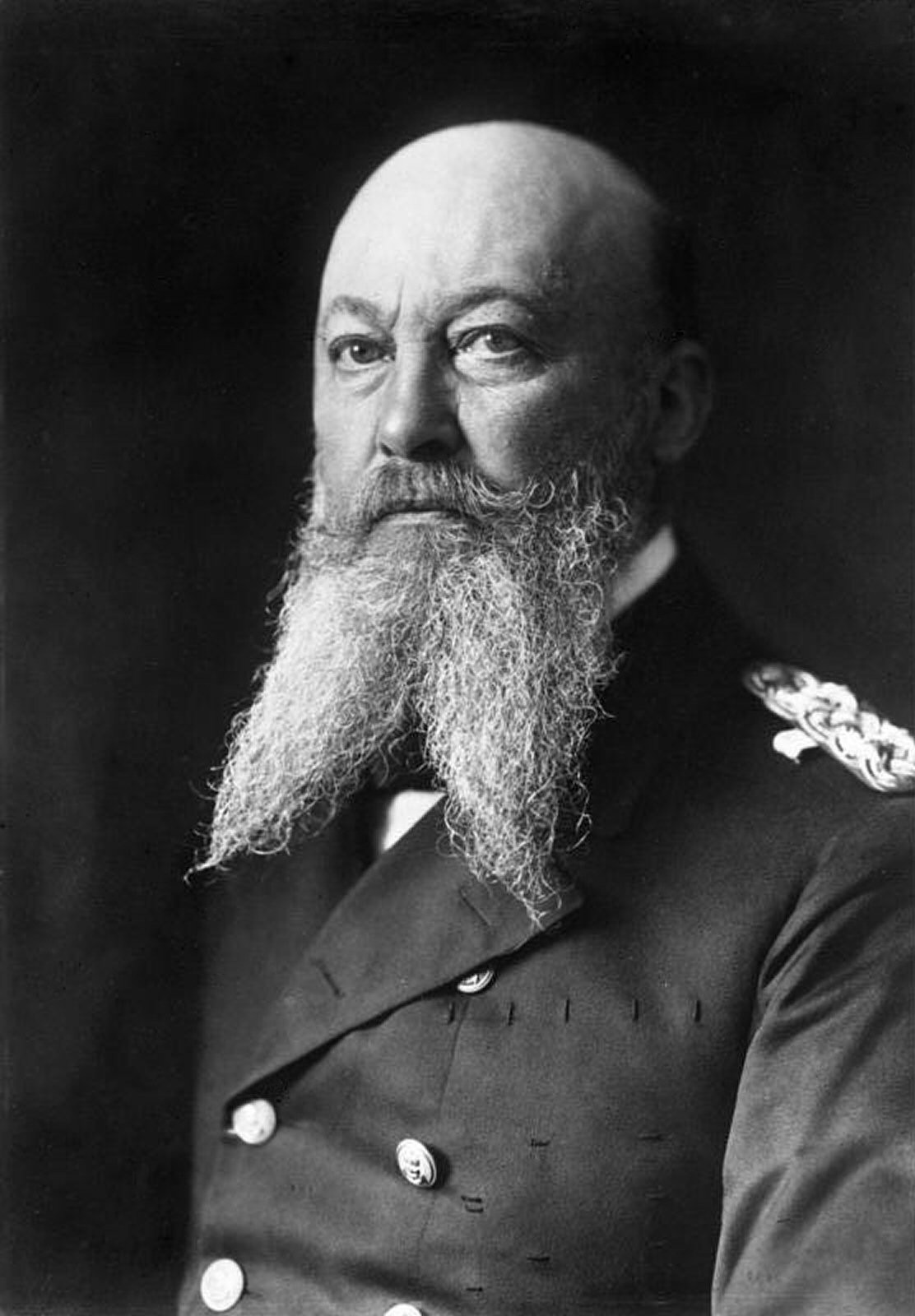
Admiral Alfred von Tirpitz

Admiral Alfred von Tirpitz's design for Germany to achieve world power status through naval power, while at the same time addressing domestic issues, is referred to as the Tirpitz Plan. Politically, the Tirpitz Plan was marked by the Fleet Acts of 1898, 1900, 1908 and 1912. By 1914, they had given Germany the second-largest naval force in the world (roughly 40% smaller than the Royal Navy). It included seventeen modern dreadnoughts, five battlecruisers, twenty-five cruisers and twenty pre-dreadnought battleships as well as over forty submarines. Although including fairly unrealistic targets, the expansion programme was sufficient to alarm the British, starting a costly naval arms race and pushing the British into closer ties with the French.

Tirpitz developed a "Risk Theory" whereby, if the German Imperial Navy reached a certain level of strength relative to the British Royal Navy, the British would try to avoid confrontation with Germany (that is, maintain a fleet in being). If the two navies fought, the German Navy would inflict enough damage on the British that the latter ran a risk of losing their naval dominance. Because the British relied on their navy to maintain control over the British Empire, Tirpitz felt they would opt to maintain naval supremacy in order to safeguard their empire, and let Germany become a world power, rather than lose the empire as the price of keeping Germany less powerful. This theory sparked a naval arms race between Germany and Great Britain in the first decade of the 20th century.

This theory was based on the assumption that Great Britain would have to send its fleet into the German Bight for a close blockade of the ports (blockading Germany was the only way that the Royal Navy could seriously harm Germany), where the German Navy could force a battle. However, due to Germany's geographic location, Great Britain could employ a distant blockade by closing the entrance to the North Sea in the English Channel and the area between Bergen and the Shetland Islands. Faced with this option a German Admiral commented, "If the British do that, the role of our navy will be a sad one," correctly predicting the role the surface fleet would have during the First World War.

Additionally the plan had domestic political concerns in mind, mainly the preservation of the political status quo and combatting the rise of the Social Democrats. Tirpitz believed that the development of maritime power would advance Germany's economic interests and so serve as a "palliative against educated and uneducated Social Democrats". While Chancellor Bernhard von Bülow, wrote that the plan would "mobilize the best patriotic forces" and "appeal to the highest national emotions" which would in turn "keep the non-Socialist workers away from Social Democracy" and pull the worker away from "the ensnarements of the socialists and accustom him to the monarchical order".

Politically and strategically, Tirpitz's Risk Theory ensured its own failure. By its very nature it forced Britain into measures that would have been previously unacceptable to the British establishment. The necessity to concentrate the fleet against the German threat involved Britain making arrangements with other powers that enabled her to return the bulk of her naval forces to Home Waters. The first evidence of this is seen in the Anglo-Japanese treaty of 1902 that enabled the battleships of the China squadron to be re-allocated back to Europe. The Japanese fleet, largely constructed in British shipyards, then proceeded to utterly destroy the Russian navy in the war of 1904–06, removing Russia as a credible maritime opponent. The necessity to reduce the Mediterranean Fleet in order to reinforce the navy in home waters was also a powerful influence in its détente and Entente Cordiale with the French. By forcing the British to come to terms with its most traditional opponent, Tirpitz scuttled his own policy. Britain was no longer at 'risk' from France, and the Japanese destruction of the Russian fleet removed that nation as a naval threat. In the space of a few years, Germany was faced with virtually the whole strength of the Royal Navy deployed against its own fleet, and Britain committed to her list of potential enemies. The Tirpitz 'risk theory' made it more probable that, in any future conflict between the European powers, Britain would be on the side of Germany's foes, and that the full force of the most powerful navy in the world would be concentrated against her fleet.

== See also ==
- Anglo-German naval arms race
- Battle of Jutland
- Haldane Mission
