= Lennard's Carrying Co Ltd v Asiatic Petroleum Co Ltd =

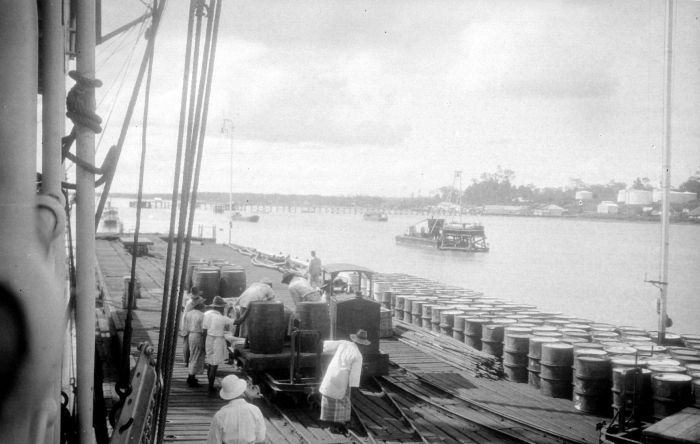
- Court: House of Lords
- Decided: 8 March 1915
- Citation: [1915] AC 705
- Transcript: UniSet

Court membership
- Judges sitting: Viscount Haldane LC; Lord Dunedin; Lord Atkinson; Lord Parker of Waddington; Lord Parmoor

Case opinions
- Viscount Haldane LC

Keywords
- Corporate liability

Lennard's Carrying Co Ltd v Asiatic Petroleum Co Ltd [1915] AC 705 is an important legal decision of the House of Lords on the ability to impose a liability upon a corporation. The decision expands upon the earlier decision in Salomon v Salomon & Co. [1897] AC 22 and first introduced the "alter ego" theory of corporate liability.

== Facts ==
A ship owned by Lennard's Carrying Company was transporting some goods on a voyage from Novorossiysk to the Asiatic Petroleum Company, a joint venture of the Shell and Royal Dutch oil companies. The ship sank and the cargo was lost. The judge found that the director, Mr Lennard, did know or should have known about defects in the ship, which led its boiler to catch fire, and ultimately caused the ship to sink. There was an exemption from liability in section 502 of the Merchant Shipping Act 1894 (57 & 58 Vict. c. 60), stating that a ship owner would not be liable for losses if an event happened without "actual fault or privity". Asiatic Petroleum sued Mr Lennard's company for negligence under the Act. At issue was whether the guilty acts of a director would be imposed upon the corporation. Lennard's Carrying Company argued that it was not liable and could be exempt under section 502.

== Judgment ==
The House of Lords held that liability could be imposed on a corporation for the acts of the directors because there is a rebuttable presumption that the directors are the controlling minds of the company. Here Mr Lennard did not rebut the presumption. Viscount Haldane explained the "directing mind" principle of corporate liability:

...a corporation is an abstraction. It has no mind of its own any more than it has a body of its own; its active and directing will must consequently be sought in the person of somebody who for some purposes may be called an agent, but who is really the directing mind and will of the corporation, the very ego and centre of the personality of the corporation. .... It must be upon the true construction of that section in such a case as the present one that the fault or privity is the fault or privity of somebody who is not merely a servant or agent for whom the company is liable upon the footing respondeat superior, but somebody for whom the company is liable because his action is the very action of the company itself. It is not enough that the fault should be the fault of a servant in order to exonerate the owner, the fault must also be one which is not the fault of the owner, or a fault to which the owner is privy; and I take the view that when anybody sets up that section to excuse himself from the normal consequences of the maxim respondeat superior the burden lies upon him to do so.

In considering the case of Mr Lennard himself, he stated:

...whatever is not known about Mr. Lennard's position, this is known for certain, Mr. Lennard took the active part in the management of this ship on behalf of the owners, and Mr. Lennard, as I have said, was registered as the person designated for this purpose in the ship's register. Mr. Lennard therefore was the natural person to come on behalf of the owners and give full evidence not only about the events of which I have spoken, and which related to the seaworthiness of the ship, but about his own position and as to whether or not he was the life and soul of the company. For if Mr. Lennard was the directing mind of the company, then his action must, unless a corporation is not to be liable at all, have been an action which was the action of the company itself...

== Significance ==
Prior to this case the primary means of imposing liability on a corporation was through vicarious liability, but that applied only to employees of the company and excluded the directors. Since the Lennard case, the alter ego theory has become the most powerful method of imposing liability on a corporation. It has proved to be particularly effective for imposing criminal liability.
