= Haldane Mission =

1912 British diplomatic mission to Germany

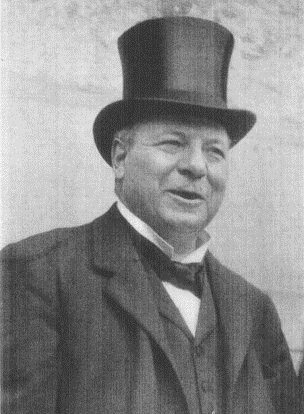
Richard Haldane

The Haldane Mission of February 1912 was an unsuccessful effort by the British to seek détente with Germany and reduce dangerous friction between Britain and Germany arising because of their escalating naval arms race.

British politician Richard Haldane, 1st Viscount Haldane wanted a slowdown in the naval race and Germany wanted British neutrality in a future war. The negotiations were initiated by worried businessmen on either side, and continued by the British cabinet on the one side and the Kaiser and his top aides on the other. The collapse came when Germany insisted on a promise that Britain would be neutral and not join a country that started a war on Germany.

According to British historian John C. G. Röhl:

February 1912 is rightly regarded as a decisive event in the years leading up to the First World War. Seldom was the incompatibility between Great Britain’s balance-of-power policy of maintaining the status quo and the German Reich’s claim to the leadership of continental Europe so strikingly displayed.

== Political lineups ==
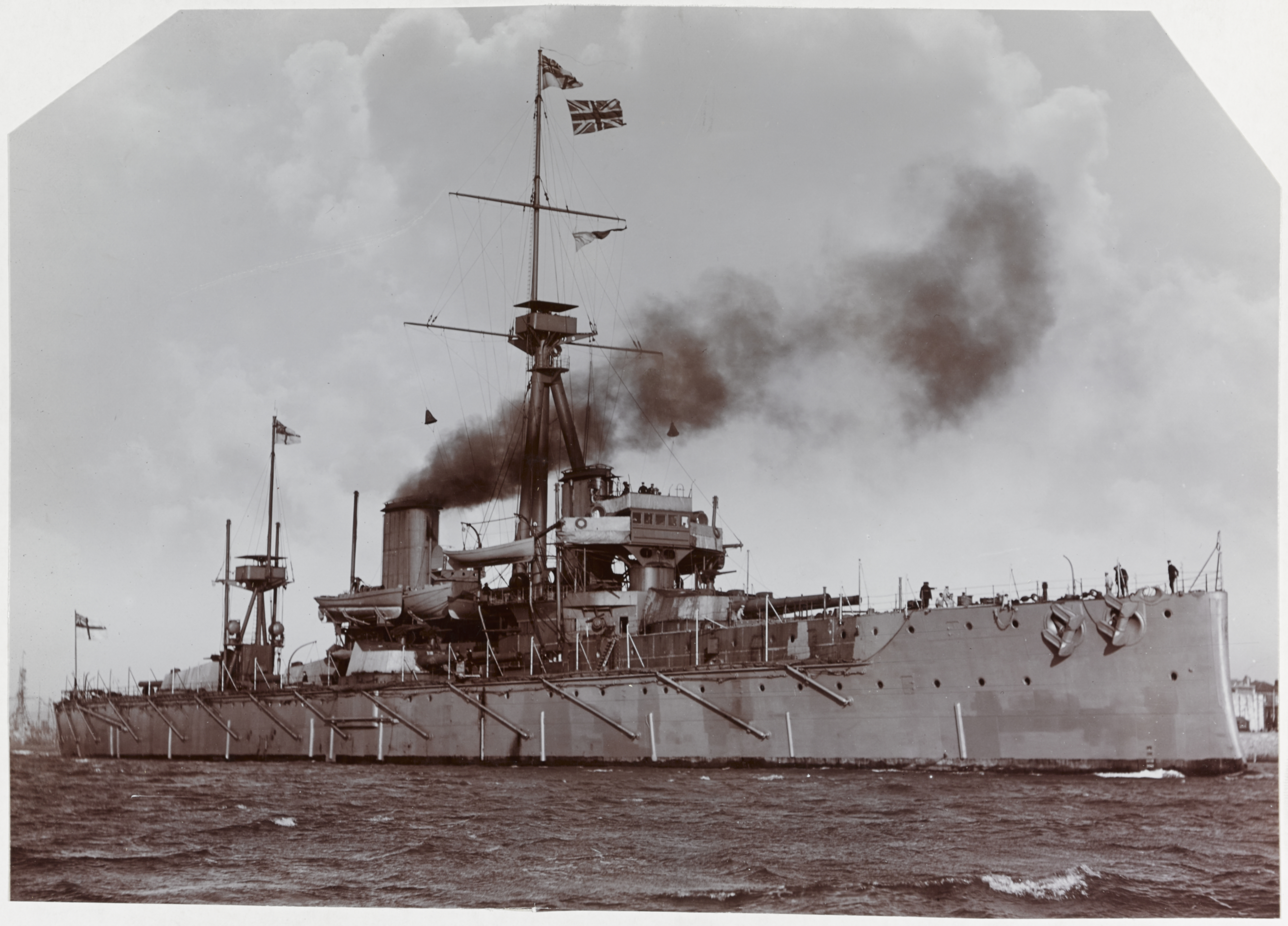
HMS Dreadnought

By 1912 the most critical issue threatening British-German relations was the rapid build-up of the German Navy. Both sides emphasized national honor, especially as related to military power. Britain depended heavily on the superiority of the Royal Navy to defend the home islands and the entire British Empire. London decided that the rapid German naval expansion of the Tirpitz Plan had to be matched. Britain had to build at least three major warships for every two that Germany built. Furthermore, Berlin's reckless diplomacy, as exemplified in the 1911 Agadir Crisis, made Germany an increasingly worrying potential enemy, as London moved closer to Germany's two great rivals Russia and France. However the Liberal government prioritised social spending, and had a strong pacifist element, typified by David Lloyd George, that deeply distrusted heavy spending on the Army or Navy. In the Cabinet, he confronted the civilian head of the Navy, First Lord of the Admiralty from 1911-15 Winston Churchill, a Liberal at this time. Churchill agreed with Prime Minister H. H. Asquith and Foreign Minister Edward Grey that the only solution was to have Germany slow down its naval construction. The deal that Haldane's mission proposed was a slow-down or pause in the German build-up. In return, Britain would support Germany's colonial ambitions, and promise not to engage in aggressive warfare against Germany.

The 1911 Agadir Crisis had been a diplomatic disaster for Berlin, leading to accurate fears among the German government that the British would side with France in any war against Germany. France moved its main North Sea fleet to the Mediterranean. Britain moved ships from the Mediterranean, where it confronted Austria and Italy, to the North Sea where it confronted Germany and protected France from the German navy. Berlin did not know what secret alliances London and Paris had reached, but feared for the worst. (Actually there was no formal alliance, but the British government now felt responsible for the defence of France.) The Tirpitz Plan was taking half the defence budget, and even so Britain maintained a dominance in naval power. The Germany army was the basis of its wartime strength, and pro-army advocates finally began to mobilize and demand a bigger budget. However, Germany had a smaller revenue-generating potential than Britain, in terms of tax-base and borrowing ability. Furthermore the anti-war Social Democratic Party was now the largest party in the Reichstag, and a major increase in defence spending was politically impossible. Germany too needed a way to stop the ruinous naval race in order to spend more on its army; it hoped also to keep Britain neutral in a war between Germany and France.

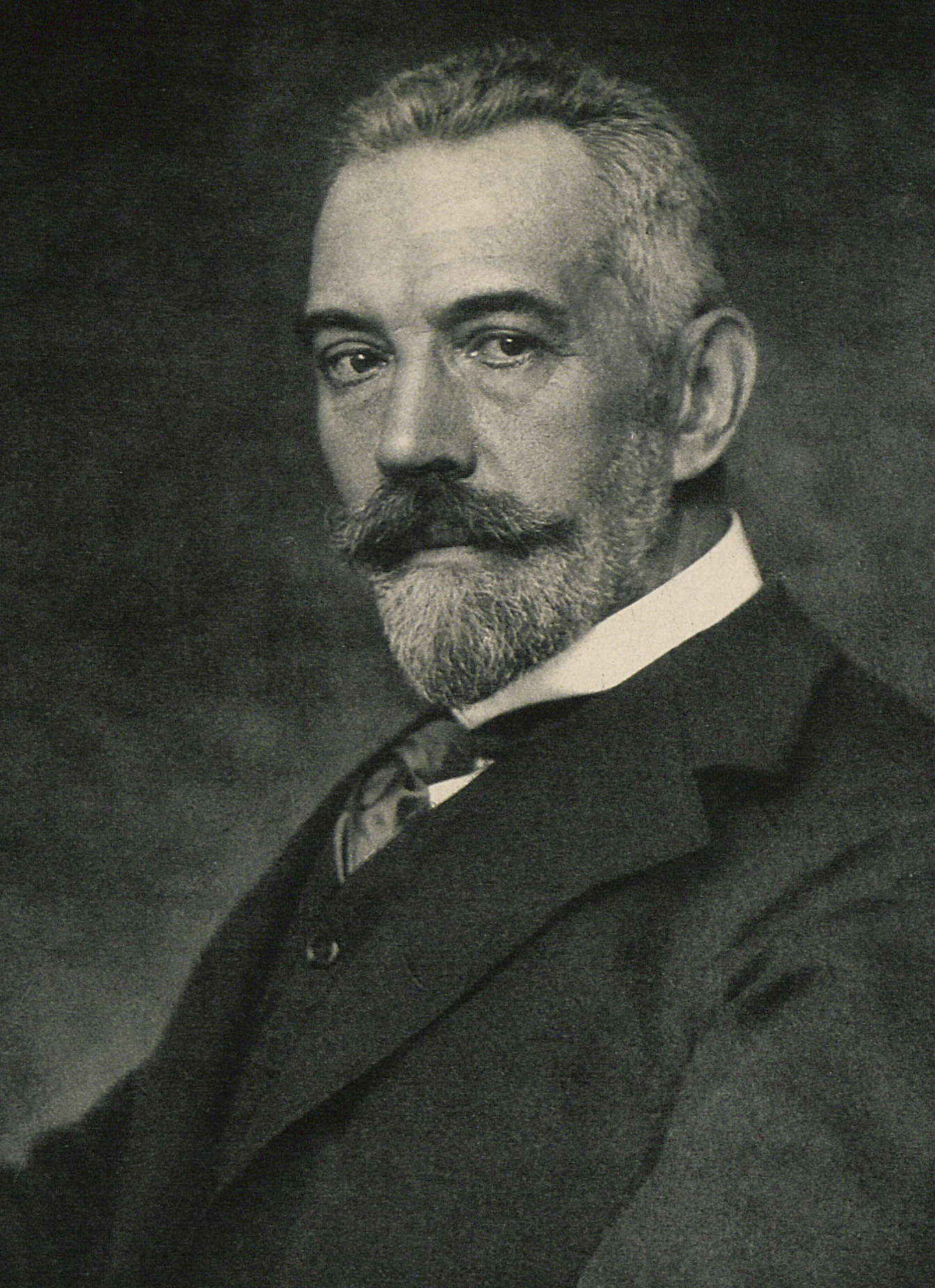
Theobald von Bethmann Hollweg

== On the German side ==
After the debacle of the Second Moroccan Crisis, Chancellor Theobald von Bethmann Hollweg sought a more realistic foreign policy, one that would focus on specific objectives in line with Great Britain. Instead of a policy based on strength and confrontation, Hollweg wanted to pursue closer ties with Great Britain. Hollweg viewed reconciliation with Great Britain as his key foreign policy project. He believed that only through an agreement with Great Britain the German Empire could secure its position against the threat of the Franco-Russian Alliance. The long-term goal of his policy was a neutrality agreement with London. Independently of this, the German embassy counselor in London, Richard von Kühlmann, promoted a foreign policy program that saw Germany as a junior partner to the British Empire. He believed that the German Empire should pursue its goals in close coordination with London. Specifically, he considered the acquisition of further colonies in Central Africa to be particularly desirable, which should be carried out with the acquiescence of Great Britain. Bethmann Hollweg had identified the naval armament program pursued by Tirpitz as the main obstacle to an understanding between Great Britain and Germany.

== On the British side ==
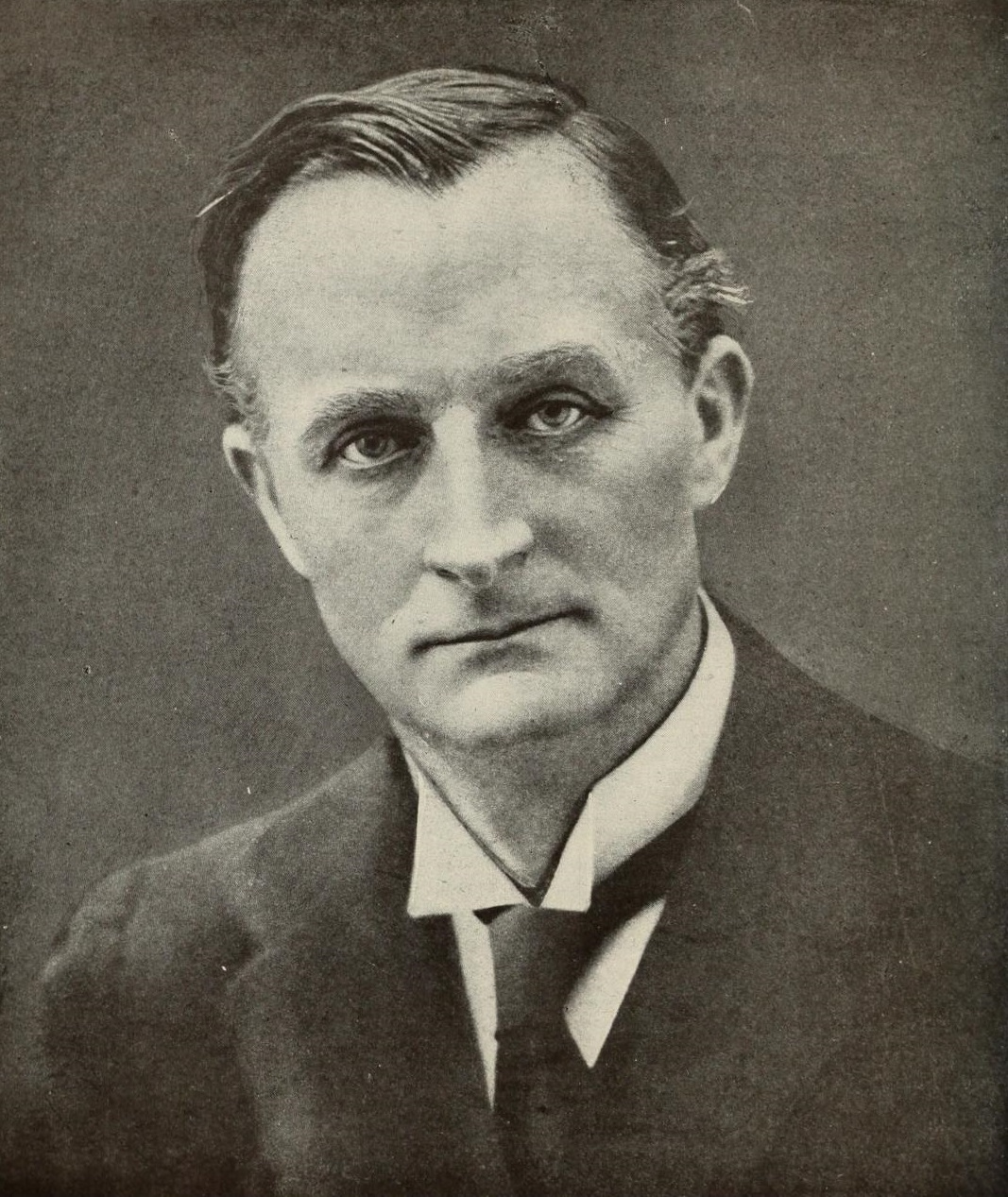
British Foreign Secretary Sir Edward Grey

After the Liberals replaced the Conservative government in December 1905, the newly formed Liberal government aimed to reduce the "gigantic military expenditures" of its predecessors. Domestically, the Liberal governments under Henry Campbell-Bannerman and his successor H. H. Asquith (beginning in 1908) launched an extensive welfare program. Due to their financial implications these reforms were contentious. Alongside the increased spending on the welfare program, the naval arms race necessitated ever-larger sums for the maintenance and expansion of the Royal Navy. Already when the Liberals took office in 1905, allocations to the Royal Navy had amounted to £30 million, one-fifth of the total annual budget. The general naval arms race further increased these expenditures. In order to maintain the two-power standard, the British government was forced to continually increase spending. However, the increased financial burden was not offset by any increase in revenue. The liberal government was therefore keen to reach an agreement to end the general arms race. Asquith's government had inherited from its two predecessors the policy of reconciliation with the Third French Republic, which Foreign Minister Edward Grey continued and expanded. At the same time, a settlement was reached with the Russian Empire (Treaty of Saint Petersburg, 1907).

== Initial contacts and preliminary planning ==
At this point in January 1912 two well-connected civilians entered the picture, and brokered negotiations between their respective governments. German-born London financier Ernest Cassel was a close friend of both Britain's King Edward VII and Albert Ballin, head of the Hamburg-America Line, the world's largest steamship company. Ballin was a personal friend of the Kaiser.

A memorandum was prepared by Sir Edward Grey, Winston Churchill, and Lloyd George for the British Cabinet. Cassel brought the document to Berlin on January 29, 1912, where it immediately came to the attention of the Kaiser and his top officials. These proposals were:

1. Fundamental. Naval superiority recognised as essential to Great Britain. Present German naval program and expenditure not to be increased, but if possible retarded and reduced.
2. England sincerely desires not to interfere with German Colonial expansion. To give effect to this she is prepared forthwith to discuss whatever the German aspirations in that direction may be. England will be glad to know that there is a field or special points where she can help Germany.
3. Proposals for reciprocal assurances debarring either power from joining in aggressive designs or combinations against the other would be welcome.

The main goal of the British Cabinet was the first item; the other two were concessions. The first item referred to the current German naval budget. London did not know that a new, much more aggressive naval budget (called a "Novelle") had been drafted in Berlin but not yet approved. The Germans gave Haldane a copy which he took to the Cabinet without reading. The second item was a concession; London was prepared to turn over parts of the old decaying Portuguese Empire. Berlin focused its attention on the third item—it very seriously wanted British neutrality in a possible war. The German Navy under Admiral Alfred von Tirpitz had mobilized elite and popular opinion behind a new expansion of the Navy, and had just won the Kaiser's approval for its Novelle, despite the argument by the civilian government under Chancellor Theobald von Bethmann Hollweg that considered it too expensive. Germany's civilian government, however, did not control military affairs. Upon reading the British proposals, Bethmann Hollweg and the Kaiser were willing to cut the naval expansion to achieve it, despite the strong protests by Admiral Tirpitz. The Germans therefore invited a senior British diplomat and Haldane was sent, arriving on February 7 just as the Kaiser was announcing in vague terms the new naval budget that Tirpitz wanted.

== Haldane in Berlin ==
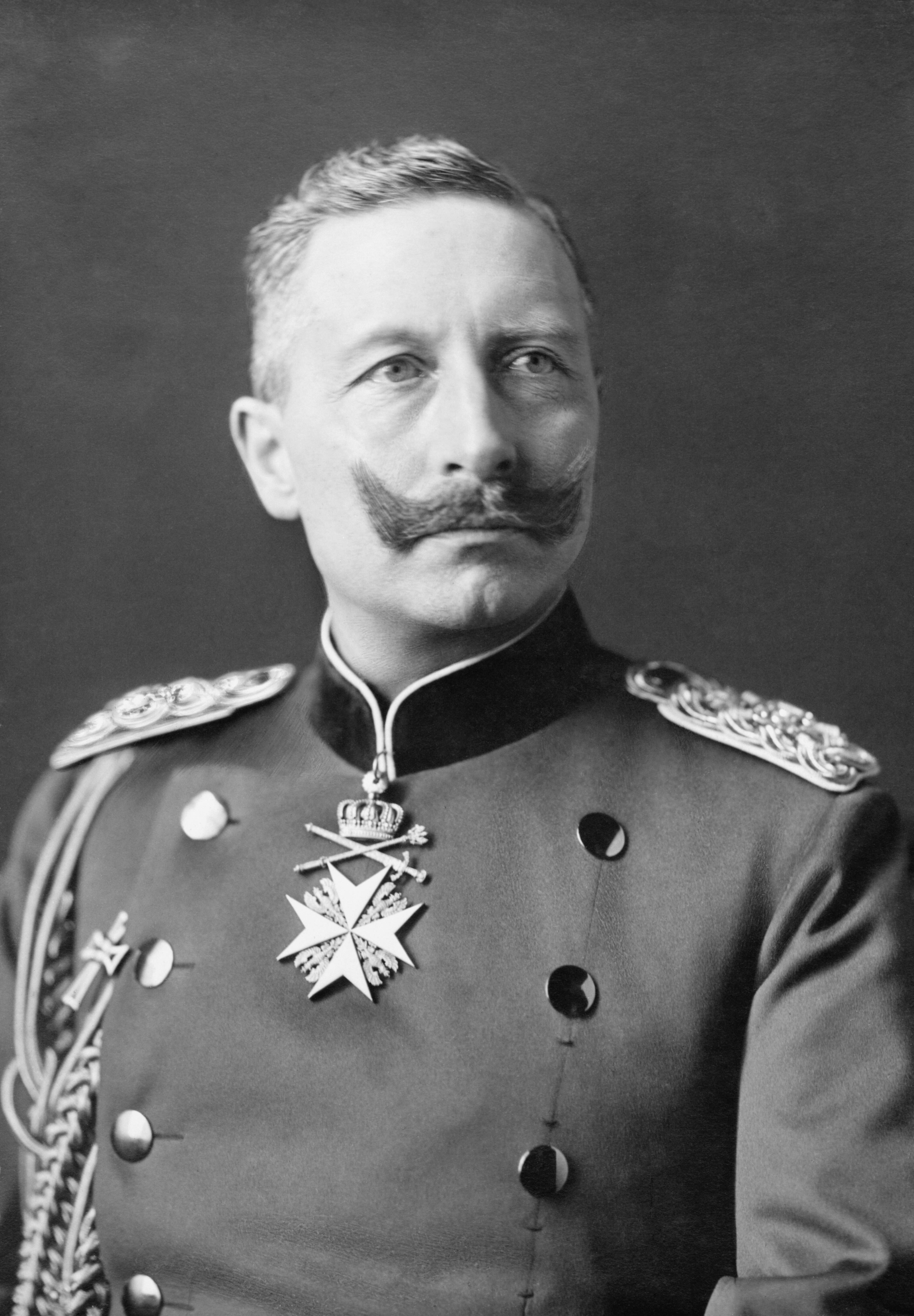
Wilhelm II.

Accompanied by his brother J. S. Haldane and von Cassel, Haldane traveled to Germany under the guise of a university matter. He arrived on February 8, 1912 in Berlin. There he first had a friendly initial meeting with Chancellor Bethmann Hollweg.

The following day, Haldane met with Kaiser Wilhelm II for lunch, followed by a discussion between him, Kaiser Wilhelm II, and Admiral Tirpitz. Tirpitz remained inflexible and refused to abandon the naval expansion under any circumstances; he was at most willing to temporarily suspend and extend the construction program. He offered to postpone the start of construction of the first additional ship until 1913, rather than 1912. Tirpitz presented Haldane with a number of reasons that (in his view) made it impossible for Germany to abandon the naval expansion. Haldane, who, according to Wolfgang Mommsen's interpretation, saw himself as an emissary tasked with exploratory talks and initially only supposed to ascertain the German side's offers, made no comment on this. From Mommsen's perspective, this was a mistake, as Wilhelm and Tirpitz gained the (erroneous) impression that their meager concessions were already sufficient. According to the German historian Rainer F. Schmidt, however, Haldane was concerned with the specific demand for "a waiver of the planned three additional battleships or at least a slowdown of the German construction program to twelve instead of six". During the negotiations, the British side (including Haldane himself) assured France that the ongoing negotiations were about détente, not about an alliance with Germany against France.

That evening, Haldane met again with Bethmann Hollweg on Wilhelmstrasse. Exploratory talks on colonial agreements and the Baghdad Railway went well. The key issue, a mutual neutrality agreement in the event of a European war, again failed to reach a definitive agreement. Haldane proposed a political formula in which both powers would commit themselves not to launch an unprovoked attack against each other and not to join any alliances that were aggressive towards the other. Germany, however, insisted on a guarantee of neutrality. Haldane returned to London on February 10. Bethmann Hollweg gave him a confidential copy of the planned new naval amendment.

== Research ==
In 1928, Sydney Bradshaw Fay published his account of Haldane's mission: In the end, the mission failed for two reasons: On the other hand, On the other hand, there was Britain's reluctance to conclude a political agreement that would have restricted its freedom to come to France's aid.

In 1935, E. L. Woodward published the book Great Britain and the German Navy. He dedicated a whole chapter to the Haldane mission. Woodward saw both Haldane and Bethmann Hollweg as firmly determined to broker an agreement. On the German side, Woodward primarily saw the ambitious plan to break up the Anglo-French Entente in exchange for concessions on naval armament. Furthermore, Woodward accused the German side of a fateful misunderstanding, interpreting Haldane's non-committal statements as firm guarantees and promises, even though the unofficial nature of Haldane's visit had been clear.

The German historian Wolfgang J. Mommsen, who dedicated a chapter to the Haldane Mission in his book on the foreign policy of the German Reich, saw the foreign policy of the German Reich at a crossroads with the Haldane Mission in 1993. In his view, the Kaiser was not up to the task of fulfilling his constitutional duties. However, Bethmann Hollweg and Kiderlen Waechter had also failed to recognise that an unconditional offer of neutrality from London was not a realistic outcome. Only a policy of small steps and confidence-building measures could have paved the way.

Bethmann Hollweg and Kiderlen Wächter had lost a decisive battle in the internal conflict with Tirpitz and Kaiser Wilhelm II in the struggle for détente or an arms race, Klaus Hildebrand argued in 2008. This meant that the "hawks" in the Reich's leadership had achieved a disastrous victory, mistakenly believing that they could best rely on the argument of arms and would be able to defeat Great Britain in the naval arms race.

John C. G. Röhl drew a similar conclusion in his 2008 biography of Wilhelm II, viewing the events of February 1912 surrounding Haldane's mission in Berlin as a decisive event in the years leading up to the First World War. Rarely, according to Röhl, was the incompatibility between Great Britain's policy of maintaining the balance of power and the German Reich's claim to the leadership of continental Europe been so clearly evident.

In contrast, Niall Ferguson, in 1998, assessed the failure of the negotiations as a consequence of Britain's inflexible stance, which was based on a position of (maritime) strength. While Bethmann Hollweg demanded something in return for the recognition of British naval superiority, Britain was unwilling to commit to neutrality.

In 2012, Christopher Clark viewed the Haldane Mission's chances of success as slim from the outset. The very fact that Haldane was sent to Berlin under the cover of an educational enquiry and lacked the authority to make binding commitments demonstrated the mission's limitations, suggesting that its current relevance would only have been recognised in retrospect. Furthermore, powerful interest groups on the British side opposed the initiative from the beginning. Conversely, both sides also had their share of influential politicians seeking compromise. Ultimately, structural and political constraints prevented a lasting détente between the two sides.

For Grey biographer T. G. Otte, issuing a neutrality guarantee did not fit Grey's concept of acting ambiguously and with ambivalence; he had previously avoided committing Britain to give France unlimited guarantees in the event of a continental war. Now, it was only consistent for him to refuse Germany a firm neutrality guarantee in the event of a European war.

== See also ==
- Causes of World War I
