= Thomas Buchan-Hepburn =

British politician

Sir Thomas Buchan-Hepburn
- Born: 30 September 1804
- Died: 17 December 1893 (aged 89)
- Known for: Scottish baronet and Conservative Party politician
- Children: Agnes McDouall

Sir Thomas Buchan-Hepburn, 3rd Baronet (30 September 1804 – 17 December 1893) was a Scottish baronet and Conservative Party politician.

At the 1837 general election he unsuccessfully contested the Haddington Burghs.

The following year a vacancy arose in the county seat of Haddingtonshire, where he was elected unopposed. He was re-elected without a contest in 1841, and stepped down at the 1847 general election.

Parliament of the United Kingdom
Preceded by Lord Ramsay	Member of Parliament for Haddingtonshire; 1838–1847	Succeeded by Francis Charteris
Baronetage of the United Kingdom
Preceded by John Buchan-Hepburn	Baronet (of Smeaton-Hepburn); 1833–1893	Succeeded by Archibald Buchan-Hepburn
