= John Hope (Liberal politician) =

British politician

Member of Parliament for Berwick and Haddington Haddingtonshire (1911–1918)
- In office 19 April 1911 – 15 November 1922
- Preceded by: Richard Haldane
- Succeeded by: Walter Waring

Member of Parliament for West Fife
- In office 24 October 1900 – 19 December 1910
- Preceded by: Augustine Birrell
- Succeeded by: William Adamson

Personal details
- Born: John Deans Hope; 8 May 1860 Duddingston, Midlothian, UK
- Died: 13 December 1949 (aged 89)
- Party: Independent Liberal (1922–1949)
- Other political affiliations: Liberal (Before 1916); Coalition Liberal (1916–1922); National Liberal (1922)
- Spouse: Elizabeth Holmes-Kerr
- Children: 1
- Parent: James Hope (father)
- Relatives: Harry Hope (brother)
- Education: Fettes College
- Alma mater: Edinburgh University
- Profession: Chartered accountant and stockbroker

John Deans Hope (8 May 1860 – 13 December 1949) was a Scottish Liberal Party politician.

== Early life and career ==
Hope was born in Duddington, Midlothian, the son of the late James Hope of Eastbarns, Dunbar, a famous agriculturalist. His brother, Sir Harry Hope, 1st Baronet, was the Unionist MP for Buteshire. Hope was educated at Fettes College and Edinburgh University.

By profession Hope was a chartered accountant and later became a stockbroker. Hope was also a Justice of the Peace in Haddingtonshire.

== Political career ==
Hope first stood for Parliament at West Perthshire at the 1895 general election but could not remove the sitting Liberal Unionist MP Sir Donald Currie.

However he was successful in being returned as Liberal MP for West Fife in succession to Augustine Birrell in the Khaki election of 1900

Shortly after his election, Hope was described in Dod's Parliamentary Companion as a Radical who was opposed to Imperialism. This was shorthand for being opposed to the Boer War.

He held the seat until the general election of December 1910 when he lost to the Labour candidate William Adamson the Secretary of the Fife Miners’ Association.

=== Return to Parliament ===
Hope did not have long to wait before getting the chance to return to Parliament as in 1911 the MP for Haddingtonshire, Richard Haldane, was made a Viscount and went to the House of Lords and Hope was chosen by the local Liberals to succeed him. In the by-election that followed Hope emerged the winner with 3,652 votes to the 3,184 of the Unionist candidate B Hall Blyth – a respectable majority of 468 (albeit a decrease on the last election of over 200).

In his victory speech at Haddington Assembly Rooms, Hope said that East Lothian had been true to the cause of freedom, liberty and justice and had given a decisive verdict against the veto of the House of Lords (a reference to the ongoing struggle originating with the People's Budget of 1909 and the Parliament Act 1911. The result, claimed Hope, would strengthen the government against the forces of privilege and obstruction. It was a victory for self-government for Ireland, Home Rule for Scotland and reform of land law.

Haddingtonshire constituency was abolished in 1918 and Hope was adopted for its main successor constituency Berwick and Haddington. Hope was a supporter of the coalition government of Lloyd George Liberals and the Conservatives and he received the infamous government ‘Coupon’ at the 1918 general election, standing as a Coalition Liberal against Labour and Independent Liberal opposition.

=== Out of Parliament ===
At the 1922 general election both the local Conservative and Lloyd George Liberal Associations repudiated Hope as their candidate on the grounds that he had not made a single speech during his 24 years in Parliament. He had not been completely anonymous however having served on ten Parliamentary Commissions and having seconded a number of resolutions, apparently without ever being called upon to speak. Arthur Balfour wrote Hope a letter of support under the impression he was still Lloyd George's nominee but he later retracted it. In the election Hope supported Bonar Law as an Independent Lloyd Georgian but there was also an official Lloyd George candidate, Major Walter Waring and an Asquithian, Mr H Pringle as well as R Spence for Labour.

It was the end of Hope's Parliamentary career as Waring won the contest.

=== Elections contested ===
==== UK Parliament elections ====
Date of election	Constituency	Party	Votes	%	Result
1895	West Perthshire	Liberal	3,087	47.7	Not elected (2nd)
1900	West Fife	Liberal	4,352	64.7	Elected
1906	West Fife	Liberal	6,692	79.0	Elected
1910 (Jan)	West Fife	Liberal	6,159	47.8	Elected
1910 (Dec)	West Fife	Liberal	5,425	47.0	Not elected (2nd)
1911 by-election	Haddingtonshire	Liberal	3,652	53.4	Elected
1918	Berwick and Haddington	Coalition Liberal	8,584	53.9	Elected
1922	Berwick and Haddington	Independent Liberal	3,300	16.6	Not elected (4th)

== Personal life ==
In 1899 he married Elizabeth Holmes-Kerr whose father had homes in Glasgow and Underbank in Ayrshire. They had one daughter.

Parliament of the United Kingdom
Preceded by Augustine Birrell	Member of Parliament for West Fife; 1900–1910	Succeeded by William Adamson
Preceded by Richard Haldane	Member of Parliament for Haddingtonshire; 1911–1918	Constituency abolished
New constituency	Member of Parliament for Berwick and Haddington; 1918–1922	Succeeded by Walter Waring
