= Alter ego =

Alternative self distinct from the actual identity

An alter ego (Latin for "other I") means an alternate self, which is believed to be distinct from a person's normal or true original personality. Finding one's alter ego will require finding one's other self, one with a different personality. Additionally, the altered states of the ego may themselves be referred to as alterations.

A distinct meaning of alter ego is found in the literary analysis used when referring to fictional literature and other narrative forms, describing a key character in a story who is perceived to be intentionally representative of the work's author (or creator), by oblique similarities, in terms of psychology, behaviour, speech, or thoughts, often used to convey the author's thoughts. The term is also sometimes, but less frequently, used to designate a hypothetical "twin" or "best friend" to a character in a story. Similarly, the term alter ego may be applied to the role or persona taken on by an actor or by other types of performers.

== Origin ==
Cicero coined the term as part of his philosophical construct in 1st-century Rome, but he described it as "a second self, a trusted friend".

The existence of "another self" was first fully recognized in the 18th century, when Anton Mesmer and his followers used hypnosis to separate the alter ego. These experiments showed a behavior pattern that was distinct from the personality of the individual when he was in the waking state compared with when he was under hypnosis. Another character had developed in the altered state of consciousness but in the same body.

Sigmund Freud, throughout his career, would appeal to such instances of dual consciousness to support his thesis of the unconscious. He considered that "We may most aptly describe them as cases of a splitting of the mental activities into two groups, and say that the same consciousness turns to one or the other of these groups alternately". Freud considered the roots of the phenomenon of the alter ego to be in the narcissistic stage of early childhood. Heinz Kohut would identify a specific need in that early phase for mirroring, by another which resulted later in what he called the "twinship or alter ego transference".

== In law ==
In the law of England and Wales, the 1915 case of Lennard's Carrying Co Ltd v Asiatic Petroleum Co Ltd. established the alter ego theory of corporate liability.

== In popular culture and fiction ==
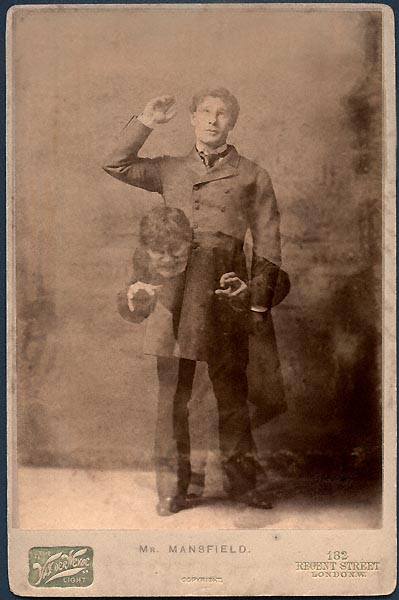
Dr. Jekyll and Mr. Hyde

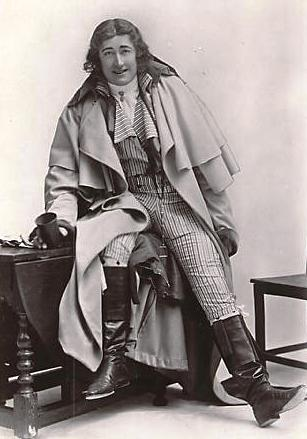
Fred Terry as the Scarlet Pimpernel (alter ego of Sir Percy Blakeney) in the 1905 West End production of The Scarlet Pimpernel

- The title characters in Robert Louis Stevenson's thriller Strange Case of Dr Jekyll and Mr Hyde represent an exploration of the concept that good and evil exist within one person, constantly at war. Edward Hyde represents the doctor's other self, a psychopath who is unrestrained by the conventions of civilized society, and who shares a body with the doctor. The names (Jekyll and Hyde) have since become synonymous with a split personality or an alter ego that can overpower the original self.
- In the novel The Count of Monte Cristo by Alexandre Dumas, the main character Edmond Dantes, after escaping from the Chateau d'If, assumes three alter egos: the count of Monte Cristo, the Italian abbe called Giacomo Busoni, and the Englishman Lord Wilmore. In the novel, the Count of Monte Cristo rewards those who had been good to him while punishing those who contributed in one way or the other to his imprisonment. He leads M. Danglars to lose all his fortune, M. de Villefort to his madness, Fernand Mandego to commit suicide and others more to their fate.
- Norman Douglas in the late 1890s wrote a short story, "The Familiar Spirit", about a man who became aware while drowning of a conformist second self – "the presence within him of this Spirit, his alter ego, which is bent on crushing his ambition".
- Published in 1905, the Scarlet Pimpernel's titular protagonist is the prototype hero with a secret identity. Sir Percy Blakeney leads a double life: He appears to be just a wealthy fop, but in reality he is the Scarlet Pimpernel, a formidable swordsman and a quick-thinking master of disguise and escape artist who establishes a network of supporters, The League of the Scarlet Pimpernel, that aids his endeavors. By drawing attention to his alter ego, Blakeney hides behind his public face of a thinking foppish playboy (similar to Batman, who hides himself as Bruce Wayne).
- In comic books, superheroes and their secret identities are often considered the alter egos. The archetypal comic book hero, Superman, assumes the identity of the "mild-mannered" newspaper reporter Clark Kent to live among the citizens of Metropolis without arousing suspicion. The Incredible Hulk comic book series further complicates this theme, as Bruce Banner loses control to the Hyde-like Hulk whenever he becomes angry, yet also depends upon the Hulk's superpowers to combat villains.
- In the film and novel Fight Club, the narrator has an alter ego he loses control of, Tyler Durden.
- Several famous musicians have adopted alter egos over the years, usually to indicate a new creative direction or a deep dive into their emotions removed from their popular stage persona—notable examples including the Beatles (Sgt. Pepper's Lonely Hearts Club Band), David Bowie (Ziggy Stardust and Aladdin Sane) and Prince (Camille). Rolling Stone wrote Bowie's invention of Ziggy Stardust was "the alter ego that changed music forever and sent his career into orbit". Particularly during the 2000s, several big-name singers dedicated album eras to reveal their alter egos, including Janet Jackson with Damita Jo, Mariah Carey with The Emancipation of Mimi, and Beyoncé with I Am ... Sasha Fierce. Many rappers have also employed alter egos, notably Eminem (Slim Shady), Shock G (Humpty Hump), Nicki Minaj (Roman Zolanski), Tyler, the Creator (Wolf Haley, Igor et al.), and MF Doom (Viktor Vaughn and King Geedorah et al.).

== See also ==
- Author surrogate
- Demonic Possession
- Ego-state therapy
- Gothic double
- Heteronym
- Moniker (nickname)
- Mononymous person
- Pen name
- Persona
  - Fursona
- Pseudonym
- Ring name
- Rebirth (Buddhism)
- Reincarnation
- Schizophrenia
- Stage name
- Subpersonality
- True self and false self
- Tulpa
