= Haddingtonshire (UK Parliament constituency) =

Parliamentary constituency in the United Kingdom, 1801–1918

- Former county constituency for the House of Commons

1708–1918
- Seats: One
- Created from: Haddingtonshire
- Replaced by: Berwick and Haddington

Haddingtonshire was a Scottish county constituency represented in the House of Commons of Great Britain from 1708 to 1801 and the House of Commons of the United Kingdom from 1801 to 1918.

== Creation ==
The British parliamentary constituency was created in 1708 following the Acts of Union, 1707 and replaced the former Parliament of Scotland shire constituency of Haddingtonshire.

== Boundaries ==
The constituency encompassed the county of Haddingtonshire, with the exception, until 1885, of three towns (Haddington, Dunbar and North Berwick) which formed part of the separate constituency of Haddington Burghs.

== History ==
The constituency elected one Member of Parliament (MP) by the first past the post system until the seat was abolished for the 1918 general election. In 1918, it was merged with the neighbouring Berwickshire constituency to form a new Berwick and Haddington constituency.

== Members of Parliament ==
Election	Member	Party
1708	John Cockburn	
1741	Lord Charles Hay	
1747	Sir Hew Dalrymple	
1761	Andrew Fletcher	
1768	Sir George Suttie	
1777	William Hamilton Nisbet	
1780	Hew Dalrymple	
1786	John Hamilton	
1795	Hew Dalrymple-Hamilton	
1800	Charles Hope	
1816	Sir James Suttie	
1826	Lord John Hay	Tory
1831	James Balfour	Tory
1834	James Balfour	Conservative
1835	Robert Ferguson	Whig
1837	James Broun-Ramsay	Conservative
1838 by-election	Sir Thomas Buchan-Hepburn	Conservative
1847	Francis Charteris (styled Lord Elcho from 1853)	Conservative
1883 by-election	Hugo Charteris	Conservative
1885	Richard Haldane	Liberal
1911 by-election	John Hope	Liberal
1916	John Hope	Coalition Liberal
1918	constituency abolished	

== Elections ==
=== Elections in the 1830s ===
General election 1830: Haddingtonshire
Party	Candidate	Votes	%
Tory	John Hay	42	56.8
Whig	Sir George Grant-Suttie, 5th Baronet	32	43.2
Majority		10	13.6
Turnout		74	67.9
Registered electors		109	
Tory hold			

General election 1831: Haddingtonshire
Party	Candidate	Votes	%	±%
Tory	James Balfour	40	78.4	+21.6
Whig	David Baird	11	21.6	−21.6
Majority		29	56.8	+43.2
Turnout		51	46.8	−21.1
Registered electors		109		
Tory hold		Swing	+21.6	

General election 1832: Haddingtonshire
Party	Candidate	Votes	%	±%
Tory	James Balfour	271	53.9	−24.5
Whig	David Baird	232	46.1	+24.5
Majority		39	7.8	−49.0
Turnout		503	81.5	+34.7
Registered electors		617		
Tory hold		Swing	−24.5	

General election 1835: Haddingtonshire
Party	Candidate	Votes	%	±%
Whig	Robert Ferguson	268	53.7	+7.6
Conservative	John Thomas Hope	231	46.3	−7.6
Majority		37	7.4	N/A
Turnout		499	76.9	−4.6
Registered electors		649		
Whig gain from Conservative		Swing	+7.6	

General election 1837: Haddingtonshire
Party	Candidate	Votes	%	±%
Conservative	James Broun-Ramsay	299	59.0	+12.7
Whig	Robert Ferguson	208	41.0	−12.7
Majority		91	18.0	+10.6
Turnout		507	70.6	−6.3
Registered electors		718		
Conservative gain from Whig		Swing	+12.7	

Broun-Ramsay succeeded to the peerage, becoming 10th Earl of Dalhousie and causing a by-election.

By-election, 14 April 1838: Haddingtonshire
Party	Candidate	Votes	%
Conservative	Thomas Buchan-Hepburn	Unopposed	
Conservative hold			

=== Elections in the 1840s ===
General election 1841: Haddingtonshire
Party	Candidate	Votes	%	±%
Conservative	Thomas Buchan-Hepburn	Unopposed		
Registered electors		740		
Conservative hold				

General election 1847: Haddingtonshire
Party	Candidate	Votes	%	±%
Conservative	Francis Charteris	271	66.6	N/A
Whig	David Baird	136	33.4	New
Majority		135	33.2	N/A
Turnout		407	58.6	N/A
Registered electors		694		
Conservative hold		Swing	N/A	

=== Elections in the 1850s ===
General election 1852: Haddingtonshire
Party	Candidate	Votes	%	±%
Conservative	Francis Charteris	Unopposed		
Registered electors		716		
Conservative hold				

Charteris was appointed a Lord Commissioner of the Treasury, requiring a by-election.

By-election, 11 January 1853: Haddingtonshire
Party	Candidate	Votes	%	±%
Conservative	Francis Charteris	Unopposed		
Conservative hold				

General election 1857: Haddingtonshire
Party	Candidate	Votes	%	±%
Conservative	Francis Charteris	Unopposed		
Registered electors		715		
Conservative hold				

General election 1859: Haddingtonshire
Party	Candidate	Votes	%	±%
Conservative	Francis Charteris	Unopposed		
Registered electors		680		
Conservative hold				

=== Elections in the 1860s ===
General election 1865: Haddingtonshire
Party	Candidate	Votes	%	±%
Conservative	Francis Charteris	285	64.2	N/A
Liberal	George Hope	159	35.8	New
Majority		126	28.4	N/A
Turnout		444	66.7	N/A
Registered electors		666		
Conservative hold				

General election 1868: Haddingtonshire
Party	Candidate	Votes	%	±%
Conservative	Francis Charteris	405	54.4	−9.8
Liberal	William Hay	340	45.6	+9.8
Majority		65	8.8	−19.6
Turnout		745	83.2	+16.5
Registered electors		895		
Conservative hold		Swing	−9.8	

=== Elections in the 1870s ===
General election 1874: Haddingtonshire
Party	Candidate	Votes	%	±%
Conservative	Francis Charteris	Unopposed		
Registered electors		924		
Conservative hold				

=== Elections in the 1880s ===
General election 1880: Haddingtonshire
Party	Candidate	Votes	%	±%
Conservative	Francis Charteris	469	52.5	N/A
Liberal	Thomas Buchanan	425	47.5	New
Majority		44	5.0	N/A
Turnout		894	86.0	N/A
Registered electors		1,040		
Conservative hold		Swing	N/A	

Charteris is elevated to the peerage, becoming Earl of Wemyss and March, causing a by-election.

By-election, 7 Feb 1883: Haddingtonshire
Party	Candidate	Votes	%	±%
Conservative	Hugo Charteris	492	55.2	+2.7
Liberal	Robert Finlay	400	44.8	−2.7
Majority		92	10.4	+5.4
Turnout		892	83.3	−2.7
Registered electors		1,071		
Conservative hold		Swing	+2.7	

General election 1885: Haddingtonshire
Party	Candidate	Votes	%	±%
Liberal	Richard Haldane	3,473	64.1	+16.6
Conservative	Hugo Charteris	1,945	35.9	−16.6
Majority		1,528	28.2	N/A
Turnout		5,418	83.5	−2.5
Registered electors		6,487		
Liberal gain from Conservative		Swing	+16.6	

General election 1886: Haddingtonshire
Party	Candidate	Votes	%	±%
Liberal	Richard Haldane	2,677	61.0	−3.1
Liberal Unionist	Philip Albert Myburgh	1,714	39.0	+3.1
Majority		963	22.0	−6.2
Turnout		4,391	67.7	−15.8
Registered electors		6,487		
Liberal hold		Swing	-3.1	

=== Elections in the 1890s ===
General election 1892: Haddingtonshire
Party	Candidate	Votes	%	±%
Liberal	Richard Haldane	2,551	53.1	−7.9
Conservative	Walter Hepburne-Scott, 8th Lord Polwarth	2,255	46.9	+7.9
Majority		296	6.2	−15.8
Turnout		4,806	75.7	+8.0
Registered electors		6,350		
Liberal hold		Swing	-7.9	

General election 1895: Haddingtonshire
Party	Candidate	Votes	%	±%
Liberal	Richard Haldane	2,774	55.8	+2.7
Conservative	Walter Hepburne-Scott, 9th Lord Polwarth	2,194	44.2	−2.7
Majority		580	11.6	+5.4
Turnout		4,968	78.6	+2.9
Registered electors		6,320		
Liberal hold		Swing	+2.7	

=== Elections in the 1900s ===
General election 1900: Haddingtonshire
Party	Candidate	Votes	%	±%
Liberal	Richard Haldane	2,668	53.8	−2.0
Conservative	John Kerr	2,290	46.2	+2.0
Majority		378	7.6	−4.0
Turnout		4,958	76.5	−2.1
Registered electors		6,484		
Liberal hold		Swing	−2.0	

General election 1906: Haddingtonshire
Party	Candidate	Votes	%	±%
Liberal	Richard Haldane	3,469	60.2	+6.4
Liberal Unionist	Gerard Craig-Sellar	2,289	39.8	−6.4
Majority		1,180	20.4	+12.8
Turnout		5,758	79.7	+3.2
Registered electors		7,224		
Liberal hold		Swing	+6.4	

=== Elections in the 1910s ===
Blyth

General election January 1910: Haddingtonshire
Party	Candidate	Votes	%	±%
Liberal	Richard Haldane	3,771	55.5	−4.7
Conservative	Benjamin Blyth	3,026	44.5	+4.7
Majority		745	11.0	−9.4
Turnout		6,797	85.4	+5.7
Registered electors		7,961		
Liberal hold		Swing	−4.7	

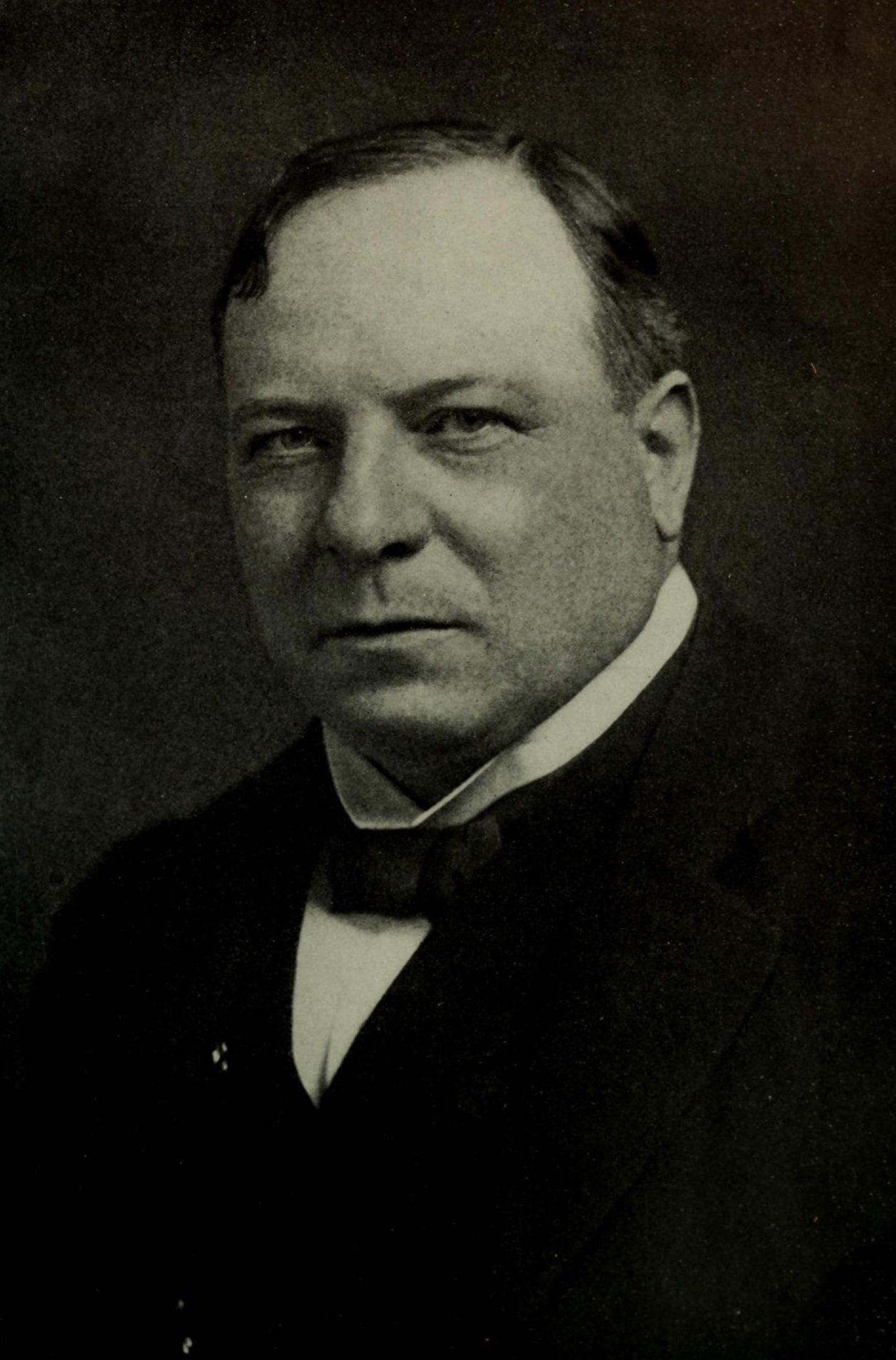
Haldane

General election December 1910: Haddingtonshire
Party	Candidate	Votes	%	±%
Liberal	Richard Haldane	3,845	54.9	−0.6
Conservative	Benjamin Blyth	3,158	45.1	+0.6
Majority		687	9.8	−1.2
Turnout		7,003	85.6	+0.2
Registered electors		8,184		
Liberal hold		Swing	−0.6	

Hope

1911 Haddingtonshire by-election
Party	Candidate	Votes	%	±%
Liberal	John Hope	3,652	53.4	−1.5
Conservative	Benjamin Blyth	3,184	46.6	+1.5
Majority		468	6.8	−3.0
Turnout		6,836	83.5	−2.1
Registered electors		8,184		
Liberal hold		Swing	-1.5	

General Election 1914–15:

Another General Election was required to take place before the end of 1915. The political parties had been making preparations for an election to take place and by July 1914, the following candidates had been selected;

- Liberal: John Hope
- Unionist: Hugh Macmillan
