= Richard Haldane, 1st Viscount Haldane =

British politician & judge (1856–1928)

The Right Honourable The Viscount Haldane KT OM PC FRS FSA FBA
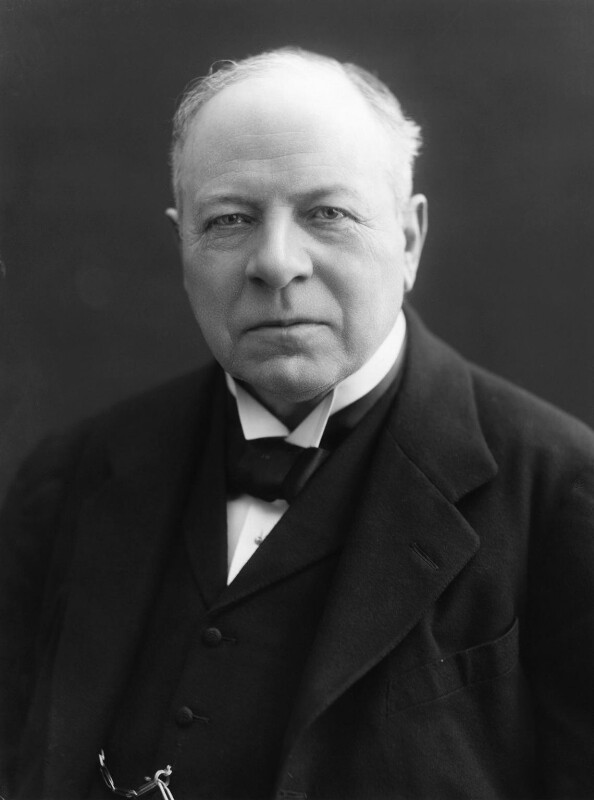
- Haldane in 1919

Lord Chancellor
- In office 10 June 1912 – 25 May 1915
- Monarch: George V
- Prime Minister: H. H. Asquith
- Preceded by: The Earl Loreburn
- Succeeded by: The Lord Buckmaster
- In office 22 January 1924 – 6 November 1924
- Monarch: George V
- Prime Minister: Ramsay MacDonald
- Preceded by: The Viscount Cave
- Succeeded by: The Viscount Cave

Leader of the House of Lords
- In office 22 January 1924 – 3 November 1924
- Prime Minister: Ramsay MacDonald
- Preceded by: The Marquess Curzon of Kedleston
- Succeeded by: The Marquess Curzon of Kedleston

Secretary of State for War
- In office 10 December 1905 – 12 June 1912
- Prime Minister: Sir Henry Campbell-Bannerman; H. H. Asquith
- Preceded by: H. O. Arnold-Forster
- Succeeded by: Colonel J.E.B. Seely

Member of the House of Lords
- Lord Temporal
- Hereditary peerage 27 March 1911 – 19 August 1928

Member of Parliament for Haddingtonshire
- In office 18 December 1885 – 27 March 1911
- Preceded by: Hugo Charteris
- Succeeded by: John Hope

Personal details
- Born: 30 July 1856 Edinburgh, Scotland
- Died: 19 August 1928 (aged 72) Auchterarder, Scotland
- Party: Liberal (1879–1923); Labour (1923–1928)
- Education: University of Göttingen; University of Edinburgh
- Profession: Barrister

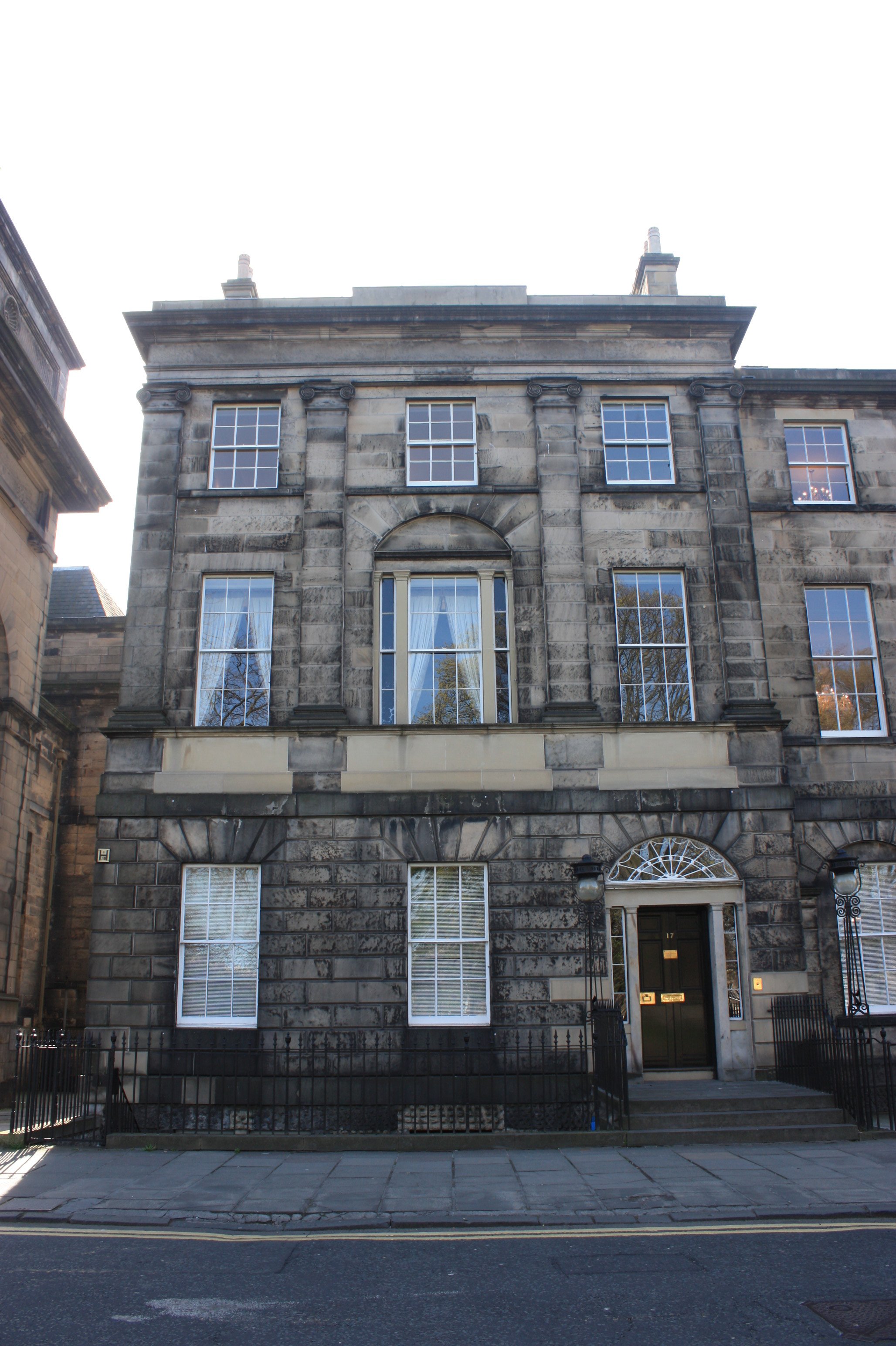
17 Charlotte Square, Edinburgh, birthplace of Richard Haldane

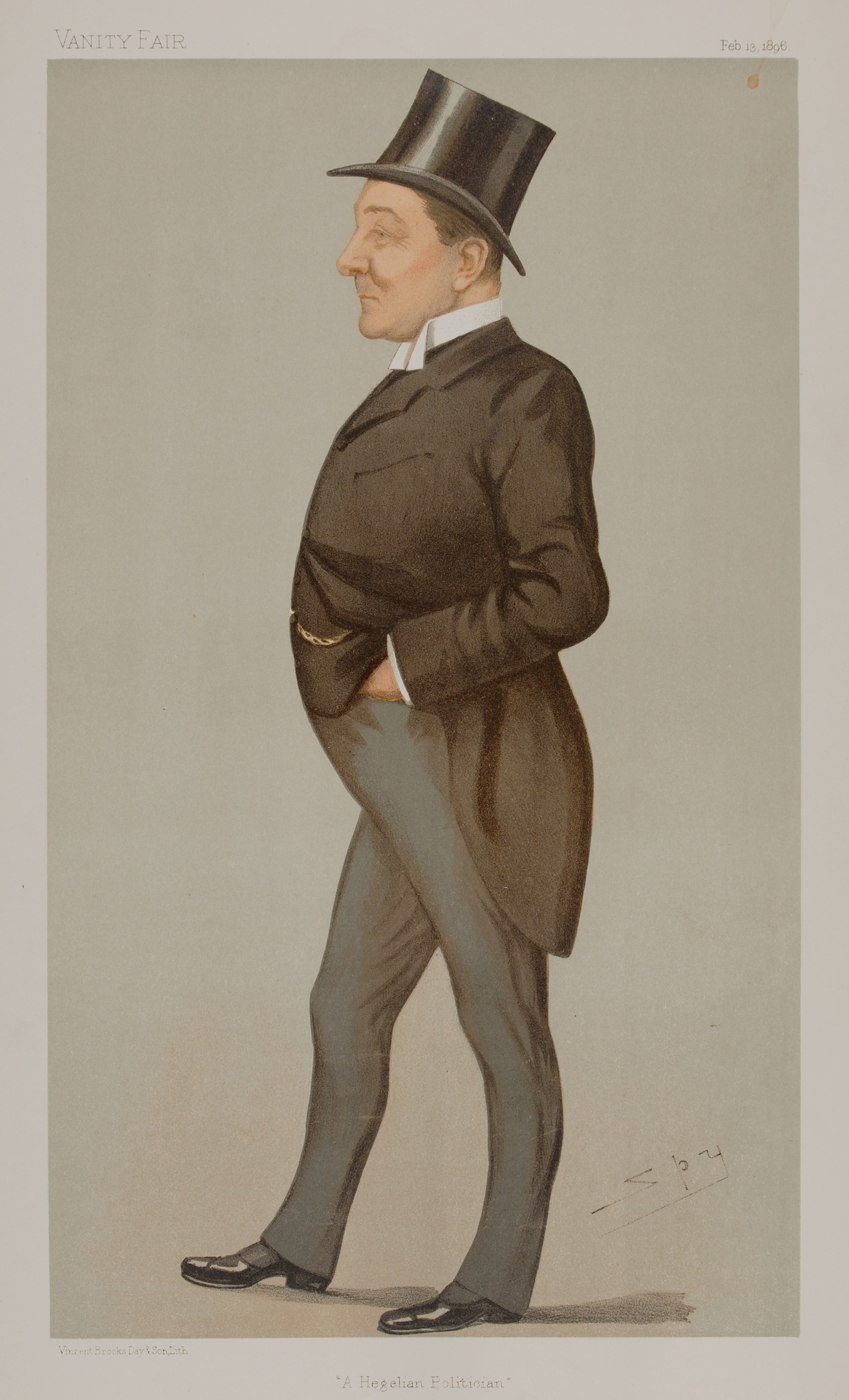
Haldane caricatured by Spy in Vanity Fair, 1896

Richard Burdon Haldane, 1st Viscount Haldane, KT, OM, PC, FRS, FSA, FBA (/ˈhɔːldeɪn/; 30 July 1856 – 19 August 1928) was a lawyer and philosopher and an influential British Liberal and later Labour politician. He was Secretary of State for War between 1905 and 1912 during which time the "Haldane Reforms" of the British Army were implemented. As an intellectual he was fascinated with German thought. That led to his role in seeking detente with Germany in 1912 in the Haldane Mission. The mission was a failure and tensions with Berlin forced London to work more closely with Paris.

Raised to the peerage as Viscount Haldane in 1911, he was Lord Chancellor between 1912 and 1915, when he was forced to resign because of allegations of German sympathies. He later joined the Labour Party and again served as Lord Chancellor in 1924 in the first Labour administration. Apart from his legal and political careers, Haldane was an influential writer on philosophy, in recognition of which he was elected a Fellow of the British Academy in 1914.

== Background and education ==
Haldane was born at 17 Charlotte Square, Edinburgh, the son of Robert Haldane and his wife Mary Elizabeth, daughter of Richard Burdon-Sanderson. He was the grandson of the Scottish evangelist James Alexander Haldane, the brother of respiratory physiologist John Scott Haldane, Sir William Haldane and author Elizabeth Haldane, and the uncle of J. B. S. Haldane, Robert Haldane Makgill and Naomi Mitchison.

He received his first education at the Edinburgh Academy, and then at the University of Göttingen. He gained a first and MA at University of Edinburgh where he received first-class honours in Philosophy and was Gray scholar and Ferguson scholar.

After studying law in London, he was called to the bar by Lincoln's Inn, in 1879, and became a successful lawyer. He was taken on at 5 New Square Chambers by Horace Davey in 1882 as the junior. Haldane's practice was a specialism in conveyancing; a particular skill for pleadings at appeal and tribunal cases, bringing cases to the Privy Council and House of Lords. By 1890 he had become a Queen's Counsel. By 1905 he was earning £20,000 per annum at the Bar (equivalent to £2.1 million in 2025). He became a bencher at Lincoln's Inn in 1893. Amongst his early friends was Edmund Gosse, the librarian of the House of Lords library.

Haldane was a deep thinker, an unusual breed: a philosopher-politician. During his stay at Göttingen he expanded an interest in the German philosophers, Schopenhauer and Hegel. He had refused a place at Balliol, but in nodding respect for the philosopher and social reformer, T. H. Green, he dedicated his Essays in Philosophical Criticism to him.

== Early political career ==
A cousin, the Whig politician Lord Camperdown encouraged the young barrister into standing as a Liberal at the General Election of 1880. Although not elected that year Haldane joined the Eighty Club, a political dining and discussion club formed in 1879. Membership was restricted to Liberals under the age of forty. In 1881 Haldane met H. H. Asquith, and they soon became firm friends often meeting at the Blue Post Public house on Cork Street. They were founders of the Albert Grey committee, named after Albert Grey, regularly discussing burning social issues, such as education.

In November 1885, Haldane was elected Liberal Member of Parliament for Haddingtonshire, a seat he held until 1911. The philosopher-politician wrote several articles for the advanced and progressive Contemporary Review. In October 1888, "The Liberal Creed" was published summarising his belief in the direction of New Liberalism. In the 1890 article "The Eight Hours Question" Haldane rejected the idea of the eight-hour day. In 1888, he courted Emma Valentine Ferguson, sister of his Liberal party friend, Ronald Munro-Ferguson; she broke off the engagement and subsequently lampooned him in her novel Betsy in 1892. Haldane became firmly ensconced in the Imperialist wing of Liberalism, led by Sir Edward Grey. At the 1892 General Election, he received a shock when nearly defeated by the Liberal Unionist, Walter Hepburne-Scott, Master of Polwarth. Beatrice Webb, the socialist who was a close intimate, remarked on how alone Haldane was in the world. Haldane added the preface to Leonard Hobhouse's The Labour Movement in 1893. Emma Ferguson died insane in 1897. Webb remarked, "He had pathos in his personality, a successful lawyer tinged with socialism."

=== Liberal Imperialist ===
Focusing on his writings, Haldane was passed over for political office, being the only one of his group left out in the wilderness. Haldane remained an ally of Asquith and Grey in the Liberal Imperialist wing of the party, followers of Lord Rosebery rather than of Sir William Harcourt. Rosebery admired Haldane's intellect, and the Scotsman urged upon his friend, whom he had known since 1886, an assault on Tory power in the Lords in 1894. Haldane joined friends at the Articles Club, including Asquith and Grey. Haldane was disappointed having failed to secure the post of Solicitor-General in October 1894. Asquith wryly remarked "A very wrong decision come to upon inadequate grounds." Haldane was sounded out for the Speakership by Rosebery, but refused it, declaring it to be a political death.

At a meeting with Beatrice Webb Haldane told her he was disconsolate at the condition of the Liberal Party: "Rot has set in there is no hope now but to be beaten and then reconstruct a new party". (Note: Diary of Beatrice Webb, 20 January 1895, cited in) The leaders of the party were exasperated and believed Rosebery to lack planning and direction. "Although Asquith, Grey and I", wrote Haldane, "stuck by him... we never knew when he would retire and leave us in the lurch". When Rosebery offered the Speakership, he refused it that March. However, on 11 October 1896, he wrote to Rosebery that he "was the leader of a revolution in our party".

On 11 August 1902, Haldane was admitted to the Privy Council, following an announcement of the King's intention to make the appointment in the 1902 Coronation Honours list, published in June that year. The King used his influence and charm to cultivate allies, bringing cross-party groups like The Souls together in consensual amity. Balfour's administration leant on Haldane's philosophy for educational reforms.

After the Conservative government of Arthur Balfour fell in December 1905 there was some speculation that Asquith and his allies Haldane and Grey would refuse to serve unless Henry Campbell-Bannerman accepted a peerage, which would have left Asquith as the real leader in the House of Commons. Haldane had suggested involving the King at Balmoral to 'kick CB upstairs'. However, the plot (called "The Relugas Compact" after Grey's Scottish lodge where the men met) collapsed when Asquith agreed to serve as Chancellor of the Exchequer under Campbell-Bannerman.

Haldane wrote, "One longs for Rosebery had he been coming in to his right place at the head of affairs, we could have gone anywhere with confidence. But it seems now as if this were not to be and we have to do the only thing we can do, which is to resolutely follow a plan of concerted action".

On 13 December 1905, Haldane was appointed Secretary of State for War, but he may have been offered the jobs of Attorney-General and Home Secretary. (Grey became Foreign Secretary). Unity in the Liberals helped them obtain the largest electoral majority in the party's history in the 1906 general election.

== Secretary of State for War ==
As early as January 1906 Haldane was persuaded by fellow Liberal Imperialist Edward Grey to begin planning for a Continental war in support of the French against the Germans. (Note: He invited Colonel Huguet, the French Military Attache to Plan at War Office from Jan 1906.) However, Haldane's first estimates reduced the Army by 16,600 men and reduced expenditure by £2.6m to £28 million, as the Liberals had been elected on a platform of retrenchment. By 1914 Britain spent 3.4% of national income on defence, little more in absolute terms than Austria-Hungary's 6.1%. Army expenditure was determined according to a formula devised by the Esher Committee. In 1900, during the Boer War, army expenditure was £86.8m, by 1910 (a low point, after four years of cuts under the Liberals) it had dropped to £27.6m and by 1914 it had risen back to £29.4m. In March 1914 effective expenditure on the Army, after allowing for increased pensions and £1m set aside for military aviation, was still less than in 1907–8, and £2m less than in 1905-6 (despite a 20% rise in prices since then).

In October 1907 Haldane was intimately involved with the negotiations at Windsor with Kaiser Wilhelm II. The Germanophile and linguist was thrilled to be summoned at 1 am to talk with the Emperor over whisky on arms reduction principles. But the import was the Berlin–Baghdad railway which Germany was hoping to construct with British approval. A fluent German-speaker, Haldane was lulled into a false sense of security believing 'like a bear with a sore head' that he had won a great deal. Another such conference took place at Balmoral in September 1909. But the Kaiser, refusing to converse with a mere secretary, arrogantly insisted that only the King was of equal rank.

Despite the budgetary constraints, Haldane implemented a wide-ranging set of reforms of the Army, aimed at preparing the army for an Imperial war but with the more likely (and secret) task of a European war. The main element of this was the establishment of the British Expeditionary Force of six infantry divisions and one cavalry division. The Official Historian Brigadier James Edmonds later wrote that "in every respect the Expeditionary Force of 1914 was incomparably the best trained, best organised and best equipped British Army ever to leave these shores"

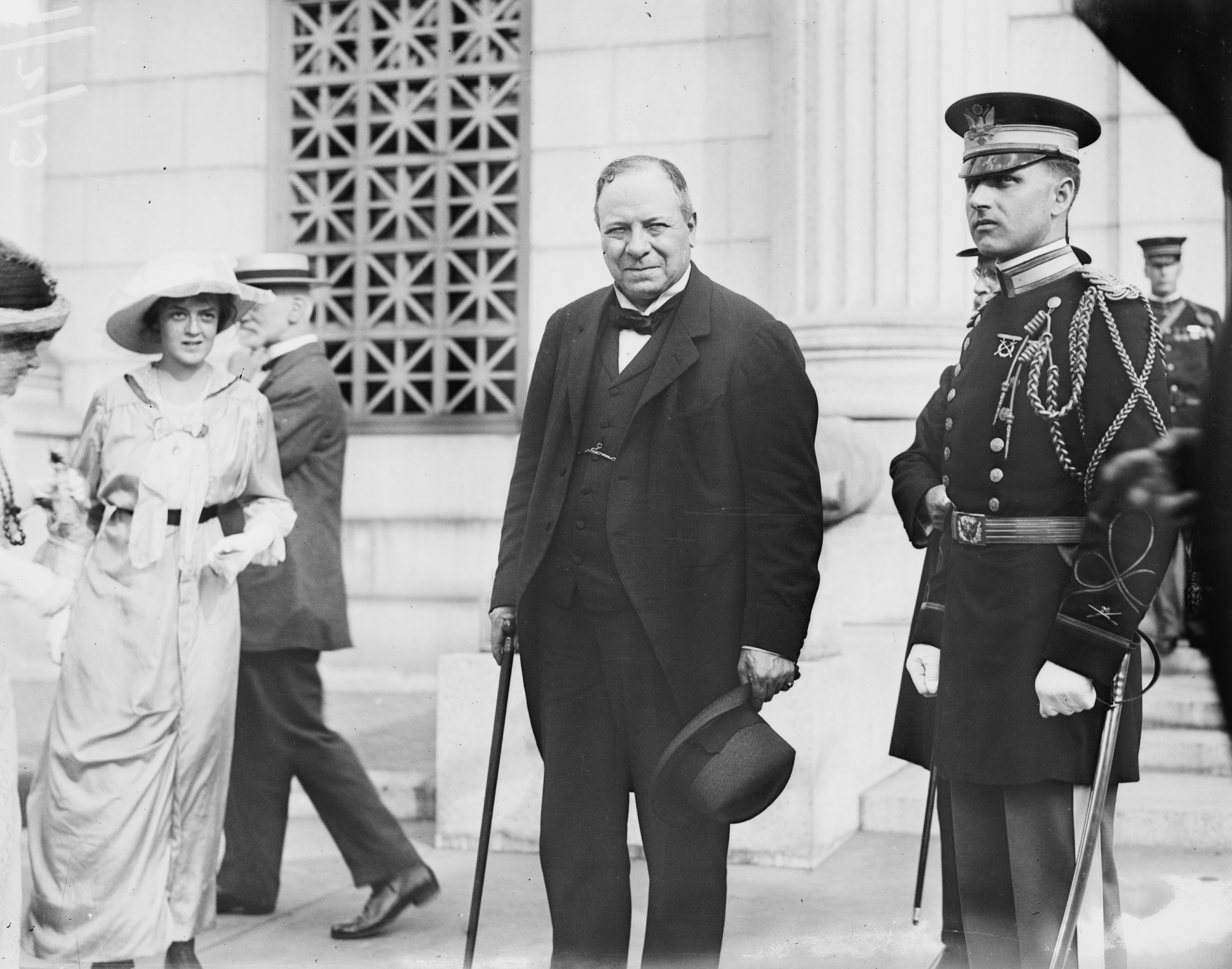
Haldane at West Point sometime before the Great War.

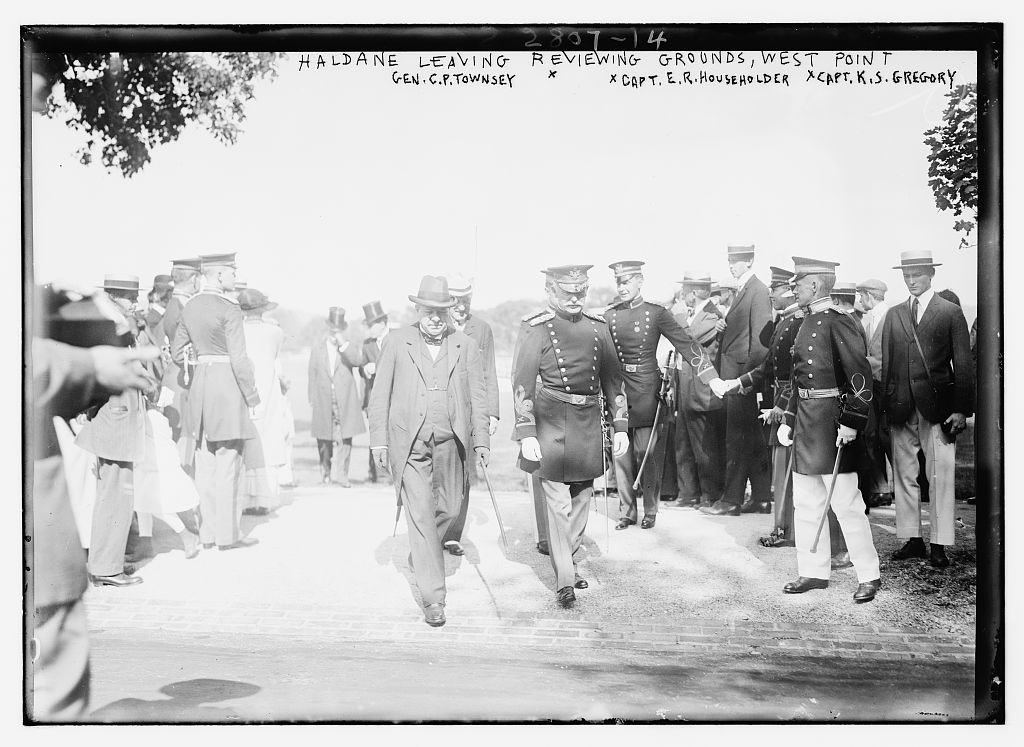
Richard Haldane leaving reviewing grounds with Clarence Page Townsley: Capt E.R Householder; Capt E.R. Gregory

== Army reforms ==
Haldane set up the Imperial General Staff. Before Haldane, there was only the Defence Committee of the Cabinet, which met only in emergencies, and the Colonial Defence Committee. Esher had recommended the setting up of an Army Council and the abolition of the post of Commander-in-Chief, but few of his recommendations had been implemented before the change of government in December 1905. Haldane's reforms also created the Territorial Force of 14 divisions (the original plan was for 28) and 14 mounted Yeomanry brigades at home, the Officer Training Corps and the Special Reserve.

In all the reforms, Haldane worked closely at the War Office with Major-General Haig. By coincidence, both men had been born in Charlotte Square, in Edinburgh. J. A. Spender later wrote of how Haldane got the best work out of an able but verbally-incoherent soldier (thought to refer to Haig) by not scoring verbal points off him, as many politicians would have done.

Usually critical, Rosebery remarked on Haldane's interest in philosophy, declaring: "I have read his Secret Memorandum, and that was enough". In 1907 and 1908, Haldane passed far-reaching reforms to Army management. He was accredited as an efficient bureaucratic leader, notably founding the Territorial Army in a Second Memorandum. His reforms re-oriented British military policy, revamped army organization along the lines of the German General Staff, upgraded the training of the auxiliary forces, and created an efficient and economically run service. Those reforms enabled Britain to send some 120,000 men to France in fifteen days in August 1914.

Haldane was also instrumental in the creation the Advisory Committee for Aeronautics in 1909, which provided the fledgling aircraft industry in the United Kingdom with a sound body of science on which to base the development of aircraft for the next seventy years (it was disbanded in 1979).

== Philosopher-politician ==
Throughout his long career and association with the modernisers or 'Limps', Haldane used his considerable intellect to great advantage against economy. A radical liberal, Haldane was also, according to historian Martin Pugh, one of the "best supporters" of David Lloyd George's "People's Budget." During the constitutional and budget crisis of 1909–11, Haldane advised his friend and Prime Minister, Asquith, on the legal niceties of his stance towards the monarch, who was outraged at the firebrand speeches from Churchill and Lloyd George. Stumbling from illness to illness, Haldane's own bad health was similar to King Edward's declining fortunes.

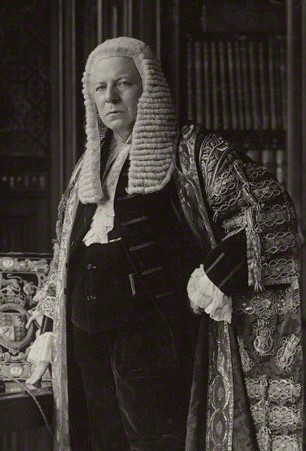
The Viscount Haldane, Lord Chancellor, 1912

Two elections ensued, one in January and another in December 1910, before in 1911 he was raised to the peerage as Viscount Haldane, of Cloan in the County of Perth. He became Leader in the Lords, responsible for the passage of the Parliament Act. On Lord Loreburn's retirement in June 1912, Haldane succeeded him as Lord Chancellor, making a self-deprecating speech as to his abilities as a legal expert.

== Haldane Mission of 1912 to Berlin ==
1912 saw the unsuccessful attempt of the Haldane Mission, an effort to quell the friction between Britain and Germany arising because of their escalating naval arms race. The mission was a failure because the Germans would agree to slow the tempo of its warship construction only if Britain promised to remain neutral if Germany should become engaged in a war where "Germany could not be said to be the aggressor." Above all Berlin wanted Britain to remain neutral in a war between Germany and France. That carried an unacceptable risk encouraging Germany to go to war with France or Russia and taking control of the continent.

== First World War ==
In March 1914 Haldane's successor at the War Office, Jack Seely, resigned following the Curragh incident. Rather than appoint a successor, Asquith decided to take over responsibility for the War Office directly himself. Asquith relied heavily on Haldane as the previous War Secretary and empowered him to carry out tasks at the War Office on his behalf. As the situation in Europe worsened, Asquith kept Haldane abreast of developments with Sir Edward Grey at the Foreign Office. Haldane was one of the first members of the Cabinet to recognise that war with Germany was inevitable and persuaded Asquith to mobilise by assembly of the Army Council on 3 August. With war imminent, Asquith was happy for Haldane to continue at the War Office formally as Secretary of State for War, but Haldane persuaded him to appoint Field Marshal Kitchener.

Following the outbreak of the First World War Haldane was falsely accused of pro-German sympathies, in July 1914, for hosting Albert Ballin, a German shipping magnate and unofficial mediator between Germany and Britain. The accusations were widely believed and were even echoed in a popular music hall song ("All dressed up and nowhere to go") in the revue "Mr Manhattan". He was harried in particular by Beaverbrook's Daily Express, which gave great publicity to the claim by Professor Hermann Oncken of Heidelberg that he had said "Germany was his spiritual home". He had in fact said that about Professor Hermann Lotze's classroom at Göttingen at a dinner party given by Mrs Humphry Ward in April 1913 to enable him to meet some German professors during his mission.

In 1915 Asquith ranked his Cabinet, putting Haldane only sixth of the inner cabinet members.

== Dismissal from office ==
Following the shell crisis and the resignation of Lord Fisher, in May 1915 the Liberals were obliged to form a coalition government with the Conservatives who, under the leadership of Bonar Law, insisted on the removal of Winston Churchill as First Lord of the Admiralty and the dismissal of Haldane. Haldane's removal was on account of the popularity of the press's campaign relating to Haldane's alleged pro-German sympathies. Neither the former prime minister Arthur Balfour, Haldane's closest friend amongst the Conservatives, nor Asquith, the Liberal prime minister of the day and Haldane's closest political ally and friend for over 30 years, did anything to resist Bonar Law's demands. Roy Jenkins in his biography of Asquith describes the charges as "absolute nonsense" and Max Egremont describes Balfour as "knowing the injustice behind the charges" and "being privately indignant".

To the detriment of their relationship, Asquith gave no personal expression to Haldane. Jenkins describes the omission as "the most uncharacteristic fault of Asquith's whole career" attributing it to Asquith suffering the "indescribable blow" of the surprise announcement of the engagement of the woman he loved, Venetia Stanley, to one of his government ministers, Edwin Montagu.

Following his departure from the government Haldane went to the front to meet his old friend General Haig, and his cousin, General Aylmer Haldane, but he was exhausted on being ejected from Cabinet. Having been awarded the Order of Merit in 1915, in the personal gift of George V, he wrote a Memorandum of Events, 1906–15, to defend his reputation. It was published in April 1916. Haldane thought Lloyd George's new government, formed in December 1916, "very low class". Haldane told Lord Buckmaster at this time, "Asquith is a first-class head of a deliberative council. He is versed in precedents, acts on principle, and knows how and when to compromise. Lloyd George knows nothing for precedents and cares for no principles, but he has fire in his belly and that is what we want."

As the war progressed Haldane moved increasingly close to the Labour Party, but he was held back by his ties to the Liberal Party and to Asquith. When the Irish War of Independence broke out in 1919, Haldane was one of the first British politicians to argue that the solution lay in compromise rather than force.

== Contribution to Canadian constitutional law ==
As Lord Chancellor, Haldane was a member of the Judicial Committee of the Privy Council, at that time the court of last resort for the Empire. He retained the position even when he was no longer Chancellor. He sat on several cases from Canada dealing with the division of powers between the federal and provincial governments under the Canadian Constitution, particularly the interplay between sections 91 and 92 of the British North America Act 1867. He gave the decision for the Judicial Committee in several of those cases, and showed a marked tendency to favour the provincial powers at the expense of the federal government. For instance, in the case of In re the Board of Commerce Act, 1919, and the Combines and Fair Prices Act, he gave the decision striking down federal legislation which attempted to regulate the economy, challenging the legality of the Canadian legislature. (Note: In 1912 Haldane visited the Canadian Bar in Montreal, Quebec Province, described in Haldane 1914) In doing so, he gave very restrictive readings to both the "peace, order and good government" power of the federal government, as well as the federal criminal law power. Similarly, in Toronto Electric Commissioners v. Snider, Lord Haldane struck down a federal statute attempting to regulate industrial disputes, holding that it was not within federal authority under either the peace, order and good government power, nor the federal trade and commerce power. He went so far as to suggest that the trade and commerce power was simply an ancillary federal power, which could not authorise legislation in its own right. The effects of some of these decisions have subsequently been modified by later decisions of the Judicial Committee and the Supreme Court of Canada, but they have had the long-term effect of recognising substantial provincial powers.

Haldane's approach to the division of powers was heavily criticised by some academics and lawyers in Canada, such as F. R. Scott and Chief Justice Bora Laskin, as unduly favouring the provinces over the federal government and depriving it of the powers needed to deal with modern economic issues. More recently, one major study has characterised him as "the wicked stepfather" of the Canadian Constitution.

== Influence on education ==
In 1895, Haldane helped the Webbs found the London School of Economics. A fundamental believer in the power of improving education, he prepared the London University Act 1898. The philosophy of 'national efficiency' was central feature of the Hegelian complex, and the ideas of Schopenhauer, he had learnt on the continent, that accentuated freedom and decentralisation from an historicist's perspective. His moral centrism sought to unify The New Liberalism, as he published it in Contemporary Review. From a pan-European perspective he analysed the German character and economic advances towards militarism. He was largely responsible for the cross-party support for Balfour's Education Act 1902. He told Rosebery "a sense of nation is working towards ...a great centre party." He was also involved in the founding of Imperial College in 1907 and in his honour the University contained the Haldane Recreational Library, which now forms part of the main library collection.

Haldane was a member of the Coefficients dining club of social reformers set up in 1902 by the Fabian campaigners Sidney and Beatrice Webb. He wrote a biography of Adam Smith, extolling the virtues of free trade. Unlike Joseph Chamberlain he thought there was no strong connection between fiscal and imperial unity. He opposed any attempt to protection of British trade.

In 1904, he was President of the Edinburgh Sir Walter Scott Club and gave the Toast to Sir Walter at the Club's annual dinner, addressing "The dedicated life" to a group of students on 10 January 1907. He also served as second Chancellor of the University of Bristol where he made an important address titled "The Civic University" outlining his educational philosophy in 1911. At the end of his life Lord Haldane was elected Chancellor of the University of St Andrews in June 1928. Perhaps his greatest speech on education was made in House of Lords on 12 July 1916, at the height of the terrible slaughter on the Western Front.

== Writings ==
Haldane co-translated the first English edition of Schopenhauer's The World as Will and Representation, published between 1883 and 1886. He wrote several philosophical works, the best known of which is The Reign of Relativity (1921), which dealt with the philosophical implications of the theory of relativity. Haldane published "The Pathway to Reality", based on the Gifford Lectures which he had delivered at the University of St Andrews. Some of his public addresses have also been published, including The future of democracy (1918).

- The Pathway to Reality. London: John Murray. 1903.
- The Pathway to Reality: Stage the Second. New York: E. P. Dutton and Co. 1904.
- Army Reform and Other Addresses (1907)
- The Conduct of Life, and Other Addresses. London. 1914.
- Before the War. 1920.
- The Reign of Relativity. Toronto: Macmillan. 1921.
- The philosophy of humanism and of other subjects. Toronto: Macmillan. 1922.
- Human Experience: A Study of Its Structure. E.P. Dutton. 1926.
- Papers and photographs of Richard Burdon Haldane, 1st viscount Haldane, and of the Haldane family., National Library of Scotland
- An Autobiography. London: Hodder and Stoughton. 1929. OCLC 771158008. OL 19765733W.

== Personal life ==
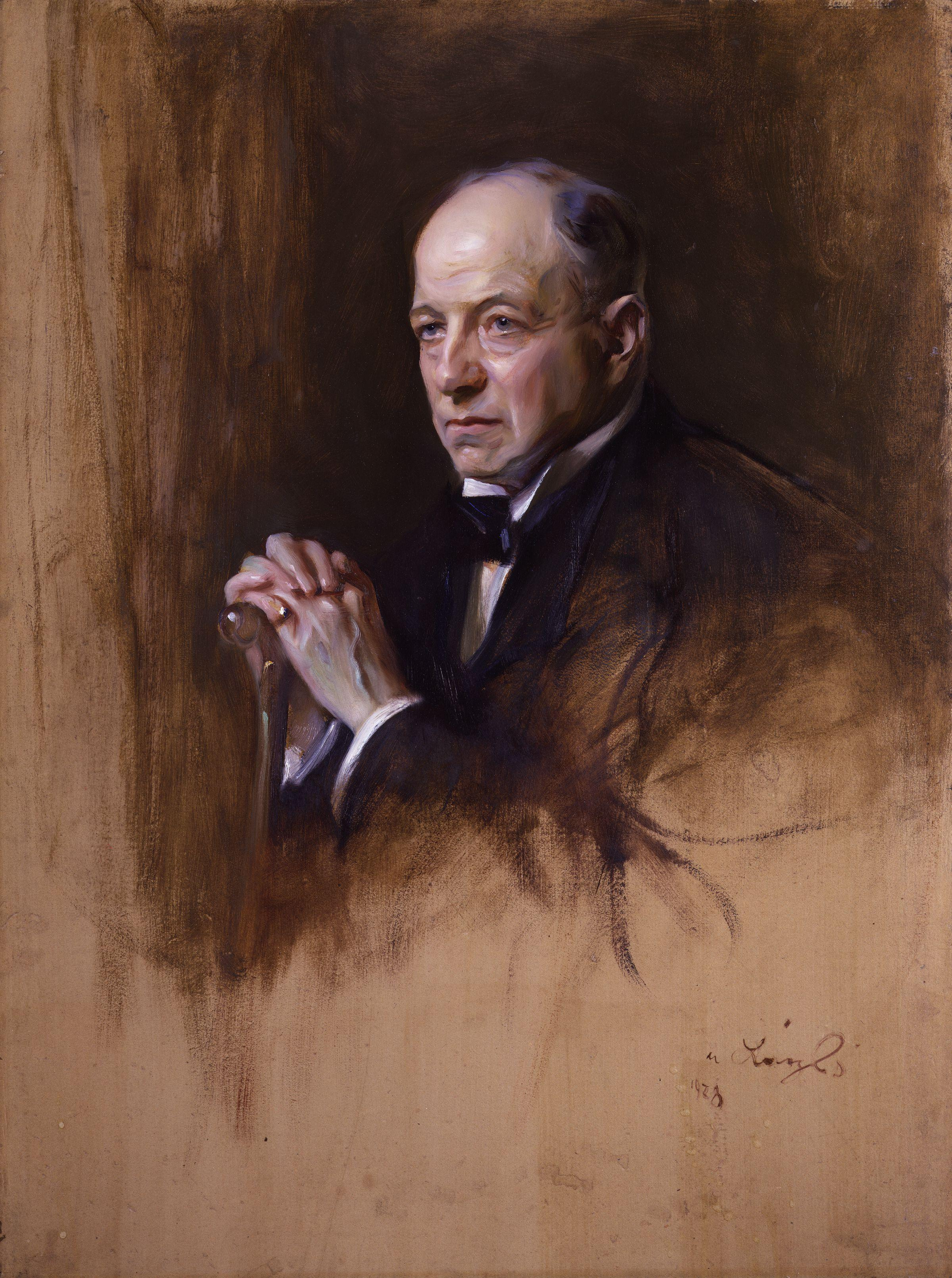
Portrait by Philip de László, 1928

Haldane had health problems all his life. He suffered from bad rheumatism, a stigmata in the eye and in 1909, he had to take bed rest when going blind from iritis. A lifelong walker and cigar smoker, he was diagnosed diabetic. "The latter is a large, fat man" was Haig's initial impression of a dignified but portly demeanour. Yet, added Haig, "One seems to like the man at once." Having worked on the Army Regulations of 1909, Haig applauded "a most clear headed and practical man––very ready to listen and weigh carefully all that is said to him." Osbert Sitwell described him as "entering a room with the air of a whole procession". Leo Amery said he looked like "the old-fashioned family butler". Another Imperialist, Winston Churchill also respected Haldane, although they were from differing social backgrounds. On promoting Churchill to First Lord of the Admiralty, Asquith advised him to seek Haldane's advice at a meeting held at Archerfield, North Berwick. (Note: Haldane was impressed by the younger man's public speech at Bradford on 15 July 1898 during his early radicalism.) From 1907 to 1908, he was president of the Aristotelian Society.

Haldane remained a lifelong bachelor after his fiancée, Miss Valentine Ferguson, broke off their engagement. He died suddenly of heart disease at his home in Auchterarder, Scotland, on 19 August 1928, aged 72. The viscountcy became extinct on his death.

== Later years ==
In December 1918, Lloyd George appointed Haldane chairman of 'The Machinery of Government' committee. However, the Armistice had taken all impetus out of the reform agenda. This work led to the idea that decisions about what to spend research funds on should be made by researchers rather than politicians being named the Haldane principle.

At the time of the Paisley by-election of January 1920 Haldane was in the process of shifting his sympathies from Liberal to Labour, and was wrongly thought to have endorsed Labour (earning a rebuke from Margot Asquith, whom Haldane wrote to his aged mother was "tiresome because she is ignorant"). In fact he favoured Asquith's election on a personal level.

Being a fluent German speaker, ascetic philosopher and atheist, he played host to Albert Einstein, when he visited London in 1921. As President of the Institute of Public Administration, he was a leading intellectual on the philosophy of governance. "The Reign of Relativity" combined Haldane's love of all things German expressed by Goethe and his works, with the Hegelian military-industrial complex. Haldane admired the fact that Germans were "trained to obey". Hegel's aristocratic desire for law and order and defence of property against revolution had a mathematical symmetry. Hegel was a purist: his work attempted to keep science and philosophy apart. The rising tide of New Liberalism and moral realism was for Haldane, Hegel's philological precept to improve behaviour, using the empiricism of scientific data as a proof.

Haldane refused to join the platform for Asquith's speech at Westminster Central Hall in January 1922. He stated that his main interest in public life was now education reform and that the cause was not best served by endorsing the Liberal Party. It was not until the general election of 1923 that Haldane formally sided with Labour, and made several speeches on behalf of Labour candidates. When the Labour government was formed by Ramsay MacDonald in early 1924, Haldane served once again as Lord Chancellor. He was also joint Leader of the Labour Peers with Lord Parmoor. Haldane was a vital member of the Cabinet as he was one of only three members who had sat in a cabinet before.

Haldane was responsible for drafting the London University Act 1926, purchasing properties in Euston. He made some famous speeches at Toynbee Hall for the Annual American Seminar.

== Arms ==
Coat of arms of Richard Haldane, 1st Viscount Haldane
Notes The mantling for the helm is gules lined ermine; the proper tinctures for the mantling of a Scottish peer Crest An eagle's head erased Or. Escutcheon Quarterly 1st & 4th Argent a saltire engrailed Sable (Haldane); 2nd Argent a saltire between four roses Gules (Lennox); 3rd Or a bend chequy Sable & Argent (Menteith); in the centre of the quarters a crescent Sable, all within a bordure Or. Motto Suffer Orders Order of the Thistle, Order of Merit

== Legacy ==
In November 1923 Lord Birkenhead, the Conservative politician, praised Haldane's contribution to Britain's preparedness for the First World War:

In the welter of sentimentality, amid which Great Britain might easily have mouldered into ruin, my valued colleague, Lord Haldane, presented a figure alike interesting, individual, and arresting. In speech fluent and even infinite he yielded to no living idealist in the easy coinage of sentimental phraseology. Here, indeed, he was a match for those who distributed the chloroform of Berlin. Do we not remember, for instance, that Germany was his spiritual home? But he none the less prepared himself, and the Empire, to talk when the time came with his spiritual friends in language not in the least spiritual. He devised the Territorial Army, which was capable of becoming the easy nucleus of national conscription, and which unquestionably ought to have been used for that purpose at the outbreak of war. He created the Imperial General Staff. He founded the Officers' Training Corps.

On Haldane's death The Times described him as "one of the most powerful, subtle and encyclopaedic intellects ever devoted to the public service of his country".

The military historian Correlli Barnett claimed that Haldane had "all-round personal talents far exceeding those of his predecessors" as Secretary of State for War and that he was "a man of first-class intellect and wide education". Walter Reid believed Haldane to be the greatest of the Secretaries for War.

== Decided cases ==
- Heilbut, Symons & Co v Buckleton [1912] UKHL 2, no damages for non-fraudulent misrepresentation, reversed by Hedley Byrne
- British Westinghouse Electric and Manufacturing Co v Underground Electric Railway Co of London [1912] AC 673, 689, on mitigation
- Kreglinger v New Patagonia Meat & Cold Storage Co Ltd [1913] UKHL 1, no clog on equity of redemption
- Sinclair v Brougham [1914] AC 398, priority for depositors over shareholders
- Nocton v Lord Ashburton [1914] AC 932, fiduciary duty of giving non-negligent advice
- Dunlop Pneumatic Tyre Co Ltd v Selfridge & Co Ltd [1915] UKHL 1, no right to enforce resale price maintenance without a contract
- Lennard's Carrying Co Ltd v Asiatic Petroleum Co Ltd [1915] AC 705, directors are presumed to be the controlling minds of the company
- Cook v Deeks [1916] UKPC 10, no conflicts of interest for company directors
- Jones v Jones [1916] 2 AC 487
- Great West Saddlery Company Limited and others v The King [1921] UKPC 27
- Macedo v Stroud [1922] AC 330, property transfer
- Jasperson v Dominion Tobacco Co [1923] AC 709, interference with contractual relations
- Lake v Simmons [1927] AC 487

== See also ==
- Haldane Reforms

Parliament of the United Kingdom
Preceded by Lord Elcho	Member of Parliament for Haddingtonshire; 1885 – 1911	Succeeded by John Hope
Political offices
Preceded by H. O. Arnold-Forster	Secretary of State for War; 1905–1912	Succeeded by J. E. B. Seely
Preceded by The Earl Loreburn	Lord High Chancellor of Great Britain; 1912–1915	Succeeded by The Lord Buckmaster
Preceded by The Viscount Cave	Lord High Chancellor of Great Britain; 1924	Succeeded by The Viscount Cave
Preceded by The Marquess Curzon of Kedleston	Leader of the House of Lords; 1924	Succeeded by The Marquess Curzon of Kedleston
Party political offices
New office	Leader of the Labour Party in the House of Lords; 1924–1928	Succeeded by The Lord Parmoor
Academic offices
Preceded by Robert Finlay	Rector of the University of Edinburgh; 1905–1908	Succeeded by George Wyndham
Preceded by Henry Overton Wills III	Chancellor of the University of Bristol; 1912–1928	Succeeded by Winston Churchill
Preceded by The Earl Haig	Chancellor of the University of St Andrews; 1928	Succeeded by Stanley Baldwin
Cultural offices
New office	President of the Television Society; 1927–1928	Succeeded by John Ambrose Fleming
Peerage of the United Kingdom
New creation	Viscount Haldane; 1911–1928	Extinct
