= 1911 Haddingtonshire by-election =

UK parliamentary by-election

The 1911 Haddingtonshire by-election was a Parliamentary by-election held on 19 April 1911. It returned one Member of Parliament (MP) to the House of Commons of the Parliament of the United Kingdom, elected by the first past the post voting system.

== Previous result ==
General election December 1910: Electorate 8,184
Party	Candidate	Votes	%	±%
Liberal	Richard Haldane	3,845	54.9	−0.6
Conservative	Benjamin Hall Blyth	3,158	45.1	+0.6
Majority		687	9.8	−1.2
Turnout		7,003	85.6	+0.2
Liberal hold		Swing	-0.6	

== Result ==
By-election 19 April 1911: Electorate
Party	Candidate	Votes	%	±%
Liberal	John Deans Hope	3,652	53.4	−1.5
Conservative	Benjamin Hall Blyth	3,184	46.6	+1.5
Majority		468	6.8	−3.0
Turnout		6,836	83.5	−2.1
Liberal hold		Swing	-1.5	

== Aftermath ==
In 1912, after three unsuccessful attempts, the local Conservative Association replaced Blyth with a new candidate, Mansfield Hunter, who was replaced in 1913 by H. P. Macmillan. A general election was due to take place by the end of 1915. By the autumn of 1914, the following candidates had been selected to contest that election. Due to the outbreak of the First World War, the election never took place as scheduled.

General election 1914/15: Electorate 8,135
Party	Candidate	Votes	%	±%
Liberal	John Deans Hope			
Unionist	Hugh Macmillan			

The constituency was merged into the new Berwick & Haddington constituency for the 1918 elections. Tennant had represented the Berwick part. Hope was given the Coalition government coupon.

General election 14 December 1918: Electorate 32,763
Party	Candidate	Votes	%	±%
National Liberal	*John Deans Hope	8,584	53.9	
Labour	Robert W Foulis	4,783	30.0	
Liberal	Harold Tennant	2,557	16.1	
Majority		3,801	23.9	
Turnout		15,924		
National Liberal win (new seat)				
