= List of archives in the United Kingdom =

This is a list of archives in the United Kingdom. As of 2009 there were 122 national, 654 local, 328 university, 1,224 special and 61 business archives.

== UK-wide archives ==
- UK Data Archive, Colchester
- UK Government Web Archive
- UK Web Archive

== Archives in England ==
- Archaeology Data Service, York
- Barking and Dagenham Archives and Local Studies, Dagenham
- Barnsley Archives and Local Studies
- Bath Record Office
- Battersea Dogs & Cats Home Archive, London
- BBC Archives
- BBC Sound Archive
- Bedfordshire and Luton Archives and Records Service, Bedford
- Berkshire Record Office, Reading
- Bexley Local Studies and Archive Centre, London
- Birmingham City Archives
- Bishopsgate Institute, London
- Black Cultural Archives, Brixton
- Borthwick Institute for Archives, York
- BFI National Archive, Berkhamsted, Hertfordshire and Gaydon, Warwickshire
- BP Archive, near Coventry (shares premises with the Modern Records Centre)
- Bristol Archives
- Bromley Historic Collections, Kent
- BT Archives, London
- Cambridgeshire Archives and Local Studies, Cambridge and Huntingdon
- Camden Local Studies and Archives Centre, London
- Canterbury Cathedral Archives
- Centre for Buckinghamshire Studies, Aylesbury
- Cheshire Record Office, Chester
- City of Westminster Archives Centre
- Cornwall Record Office, Truro
- Coventry Archives
- Cumbria Archive Service, Barrow, Carlisle, Kendal and Whitehaven
- Derbyshire Record Office, Matlock
- Devon Record Office, Exeter
- Doncaster Archives
- Dorset History Centre, Dorchester
- Downside Abbey Archives, Somerset (includes archives of the English Benedictine Congregation)
- Dudley Archives and Local History
- Durham County Record Office
- East London Theatre Archive
- East Riding of Yorkshire Archive Service
- East Sussex Record Office, Lewes
- EMI Archive Trust, Hayes
- Endangered Languages Archive (ELAR), London
- Essex Record Office, Chelmsford, Colchester, Harlow, Saffron Walden and Southend
- Family Records Centre, London
- George Padmore Institute, London
- Gloucestershire Archives, Gloucester
- Greater Manchester County Record Office
- Hackney Archives
- Hampshire Record Office
- Harrow School Archives, Harrow
- Herefordshire Record Office
- Hertfordshire Archives and Local Studies
- Historic England Archive, Swindon
- Hull City Archives
- Hull History Centre: Hull City Archives, Hull University Archives and Local Studies Library
- Hyman Archive, London
- Imperial College Healthcare NHS Trust Archives
- India Office Records at The British Library
- Islington Local History Centre, London
- Kent History and Library Centre, Maidstone
- Kingston History Centre, Kingston upon Thames
- Lambeth Archives
- Lambeth Palace Library
- Lebrecht Photo Library, St John's Wood, London
- Lichfield Record Office
- Lincolnshire Archives, Lincoln
- Liverpool Record Office
- London Metropolitan Archives
- Manchester Archives and Local Studies
- Manchester Digital Music Archive
- Media Archive for Central England
- Medway Archives Centre, Strood
- Mills Archive, Reading
- Modern Records Centre, near Coventry
- The National Archives [of the United Kingdom], Kew
- National Co-operative Archive, Manchester
- National Jazz Archive, Loughton, Essex
- National Gas Archive, Warrington
- National Theatre Archive, London
- Newham Archives and Local Studies Library
- Norfolk Record Office, Norwich
- North Highland Archive, Wick
- North Yorkshire County Record Office, Northallerton
- Northamptonshire Record Office, Northampton
- Northumberland Record Office, Berwick-upon-Tweed and Woodhorn
- Nottinghamshire Archives, Nottingham
- Nottingham University, Manuscripts and Special Collections
- Oldham Local Studies and Archives
- Oxfordshire Record Office, Cowley near Oxford
- Parliamentary Archives, London (formerly the House of Lords Record Office)
- Plymouth and West Devon Record Office
- Record Office for Leicestershire, Leicester and Rutland, near Leicester
- Redbridge Heritage Centre, Ilford
- Rotherham Archives and Local Studies Service
- Royal Archives, Windsor
- Royal College of Nursing Archives, Edinburgh
- Royal College of Physicians Archives, London
- Royal Mail Archive, London
- Sainsbury Archive, London
- Sandwell Community History and Archives Service
- Savoy Archives, London
- Shropshire Archives, Shrewsbury
- Shakespeare Birthplace Trust Record Office, Stratford-upon-Avon
- Sheffield Archives
- Somerset Archives and Local Studies
- Sorabji Archive, Hereford
- Southampton Archives
- Staffordshire Record Office, Stafford
- Stoke on Trent City Archives
- Suffolk Record Office, Bury St Edmunds, Ipswich and Lowestoft
- Surrey History Centre, Woking
- Teesside Archives, Middlesbrough
- Tower Hamlets Local History Library and Archives, London
- Transport for London Corporate Archives, London
- Tyne and Wear Archives Service, Newcastle-upon-Tyne
- Walsall Local History Centre
- Waltham Forest Archives and Local Studies Library
- Warwickshire County Record Office, Warwick
- Waterways Archive, Gloucester
- Wellcome Collection, London
- West Sussex Record Office, Chichester
- West Yorkshire Archive Service, Bradford, Halifax, Huddersfield, Leeds and Wakefield
- Wiltshire and Swindon Record Office, Chippenham
- Wolverhampton Archives and Local Studies
- Worcestershire Record Office
- York City Archive

== Archives in Northern Ireland ==
- Public Record Office of Northern Ireland

== Archives in Scotland ==
- Angus Archives
- Archives of the University of Glasgow
- Ayrshire Archives
- Clackmannanshire Archives
- Dundee City Archives
- Archive Services, University of Dundee
- East Dunbartonshire Archives
- Glasgow University Archive Services, Glasgow
- Highland Council Archive, Inverness
- National Archives of Scotland
- Nucleus, the Nuclear and Caithness Archives
- Tasglann nan Eilean (Hebridean Archives), Stornoway

== Archives in Wales ==
- A.N. Palmer Centre for Local Studies and Archives, Wrexham
- Anglesey County Record Office, Llangefni
- Caernarfon Record Office
- Carmarthenshire Archives Service
- Ceredigion Archives, Aberystwyth
- Conwy Archive Service, Llandudno
- Flintshire Record Office, Hawarden
- Denbighshire Record Office, Ruthin
- Glamorgan Archives, Cardiff
- Gwent Archives, Ebbw Vale
- Meirionnydd Record Office, Dolgellau
- National Library of Wales, Aberystwyth
- Pembrokeshire Record Office
- Powys County Archives Office, Llandrindod Wells
- Roderic Bowen Library and Archive, Lampeter
- West Glamorgan Archive Service, Swansea

== See also ==
- List of archives
- County record office and Category:County record offices in England
- List of libraries in the United Kingdom
- List of museums in the United Kingdom
- Culture of the United Kingdom
