= Archives Wales =

Archives Wales is a web resource that allows cross-searching of Welsh archive collections. It was founded in 1995 as Archives Council Wales and was renamed to Archives and Records Council Wales (ARCW) in 2004. The archives are described at collection level only, although the ultimate intention is to allow for searching at item level. In July 2009, after a major refurbishment funded by CyMAL: Museums Archives and Libraries Wales, it was relaunched as Archives Wales, or Archifau Cymru in the Welsh language. The URL is Archives.Wales or archifau.cymru

Archives Wales forms part of the UK National Archives Network, a series of online catalogues which together cover local authority, HE and specialist archive repositories in all parts of the UK. The other key parts of the network are:

A2A (Access to Archives, collections in English local record offices), AIM25 (Archives in the M25 area), The Archives Hub (Archives of UK HE and FE institutions), SCAN (Scottish Archives Network)

== Member organisations ==
- Wrexham Archives and Local Studies Service
- Conwy Archive Service
- Bangor University Archives and Special Collections
- Anglesey Archives
- Gwynedd Archive Service
- Ceredigion Archives, Aberystwyth
- Royal Commission on the Ancient and Historical Monuments of Wales, Aberystwyth
- Aberystwyth University Archives, Hugh Owen Library, Aberystwyth
- Roderic Bowen Library & Archives, University of Wales Trinity Saint David, Lampeter
- Pembrokeshire Archives and Local Studies
- Carmarthenshire Archive Service
- Richard Burton Archives, Swansea
- West Glamorgan Archive Service, Swansea
- Neath Antiquarian Society Archives
- North East Wales Archives
- Glamorgan Archives, Cardiff
- Gwent Archives
- National Library of Wales, Aberystwyth
- Powys Archives
- Royal Welsh College of Music and Drama
- Special Collections and Archives, Cardiff University
- West Glamorgan Archive Service
