= List of museums in Bristol =

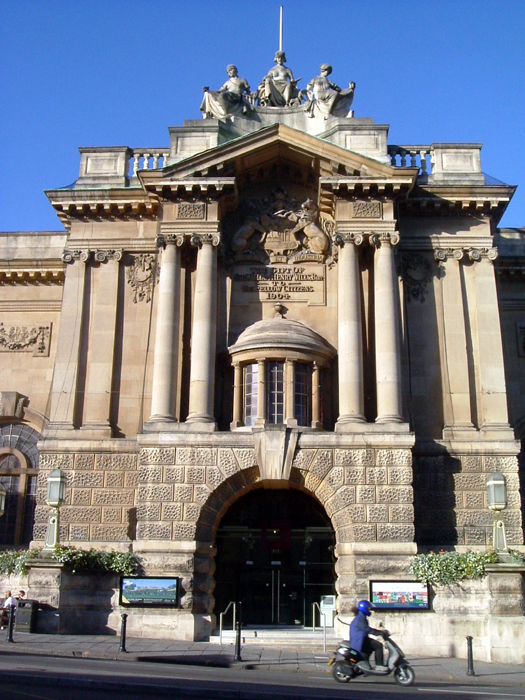
Bristol City Museum and Art Gallery

The city, unitary authority area and ceremonial county of Bristol contains a wide range of museums, defined here as institutions (including nonprofit organisations, government entities, and private businesses) that collect and care for objects of cultural, artistic, scientific, or historical interest and make their collections or related exhibits available for public viewing. Non-profit art galleries and university art galleries are also included, but museums that exist only in cyberspace (i.e., virtual museums) are not.

Many of the museums are in listed buildings. In the United Kingdom, this signifies a building which has been placed on the Statutory List of Buildings of Special Architectural or Historic Interest. In England and Wales, the authority for listing is granted by the Planning (Listed Buildings and Conservation Areas) Act 1990, and is administered by English Heritage. Listed buildings in danger of decay are included on English Heritage's Buildings at Risk Register. There are three types of listed status: Grade I, for buildings "of exceptional interest, sometimes considered to be internationally important"; Grade II*, for "particularly important buildings of more than special interest"; and Grade II, for buildings that are "nationally important and of special interest".

Many of the museums have been accredited by the Museums, Libraries and Archives Council, which sets national standards for museums in the UK. Several are art galleries providing space for the exhibition of art, or are science, transport, railway, medical or religious museums. The majority of the museums are found within walking distance of Bristol Harbour and have links with the history of the port. There are also historic house museums owned or managed by Bristol City Council, the National Trust or English Heritage.

== Current museums ==
Name	Photograph	Suburb	County	Type	Summary
Aerospace Bristol		Patchway; 51.5239°N 2.5783°W	South Gloucestershire	Aerospace	Aerospace Bristol is an aerospace museum at Filton Airfield in Patchway, to the north of Bristol, England. The museum houses a varied collection of exhibits, including Concorde Alpha Foxtrot, the last Concorde to be built and the last to fly, and various other aeroplanes, helicopters, guided weapons, engines and space technology. The main exhibition is housed in a First World War Grade II listed hangar, with Concorde situated in a new, purpose-built hangar. The exhibition covers over 100 years of aviation history through two world wars, exploring the role of aircraft in these conflicts, through the drama and technological advances of the space race and on to the modern day.
Arnolfini		Bristol Harbour; 51.4492°N 2.5972°W	Bristol	Art	The Arnolfini is an arts centre and gallery. It has a programme of contemporary art exhibitions, live art, music and dance events, poetry and book readings, talks, lectures and cinema. There is also a specialist art bookshop and a café bar. Educational activities are undertaken and experimental digital media work supported by online resources. A number of festivals are regularly hosted by the gallery. Arnolfini is funded by Bristol City Council and Arts Council England, with some corporate and individual supporters. The gallery was founded in 1961 by Jeremy Rees, and was originally located in Clifton. In the 1970s it moved to Queen Square, before moving to its present location. In 1975, Arnolfini moved to its present home in Bush House, occupying two floors of a 19th-century Grade II* listed tea warehouse situated on the side of the Floating Harbour in Bristol city centre. The name of the gallery is taken from Jan van Eyck's 15th-century painting, The Arnolfini Portrait. Arnolfini has since been refurbished and redeveloped in 1989 and 2005.
Ashton Court		Long Ashton; 51.4479°N 2.6446°W	Somerset	Historic house	Ashton Court is a mansion house and estate to the west of Bristol. Although the estate lies mainly in North Somerset, it is owned by the City of Bristol. The core of the house was built in the 15th century, but it was enlarged and adapted over the centuries by the Smyth family, who bought the estate in 1545. The south façade and the wing incorrectly attributed to Inigo Jones, date from about 1633 and were extended eastwards in the 19th century. The house became derelict after the last of the Smyths died in 1946; it was taken over by the City in 1959, and restoration has been an ongoing process since then. The facilities of the house are now rented out for business conferences, parties and weddings. The mansion house and stables have been designated by English Heritage as a Grade I listed building.
At-Bristol		Canon's Wharf; 51.4509°N 2.5986°W	Bristol	Science	At-Bristol is a public science and technology "exploration" and education centre. At its opening the centre consisted of Explore, which contains features on mechanics, sound and light, computer science, space and the human brain; Wildwalk, a science centre comprising two artificial rainforests, aquariums and other ecology-related exhibits; and an IMAX theatre. Wildwalk and the IMAX cinema occupied a modified 19th century former lead-works building, and Explore occupies a 1906 railway goods shed measuring 540 ft by 133 ft (165 m by 41 m). Wildwalk and the cinema have since closed. The goods shed was one of the first buildings to use reinforced concrete and both buildings are Grade II listed buildings.
Blaise Castle House Museum		Henbury; 51.504°N 2.632°W	Bristol	Multiple	Blaise Castle is an 18th-century mansion house and estate. It was immortalised by being described as "the finest place in England" in Jane Austen's novel Northanger Abbey. It is a grade II* listed building, and scheduled monument. A branch of the Bristol City Museum and Art Gallery since 1949, Blaise Castle House now features historic household items, toys, period costumes, mid-Victorian paintings, recreated Victorian schoolroom.
Bristol City Museum and Art Gallery		Clifton; 51.4561°N 2.6053°W	Bristol	Multiple	The Bristol City Museum and Art Gallery is run by the city council with no entrance fee. It holds designated museum status, granted by the national government to protect outstanding museums. The museum includes sections on natural history, local, national and international archaeology, and local industry. The art gallery contains works from all periods, including many by internationally famous artists, as well a collection of modern paintings of Bristol. The building is of Edwardian Baroque architecture and has been designated by English Heritage as a grade II* listed building.
Clifton Observatory Museum		Clifton; 51.4566°N 2.6265°E	Bristol	Multiple	Clifton Observatory Museum is located in the tower of the Observatory at Clifton Down.Built in 1766, the observatory was originally a windmill that burned down twice within 10 years of its construction. In 1828 the building was leased to William West, who rebuilt and renovated it into an observatory, installing a Camera Obscura in the tower. Today, it is a grade II* listed building and the Camera Obscura, one of the only working ones in the country, remains in the tower and is open to the public to view. The museum holds displays about the site's past as a Celtic Fort and the life of William West and some of his contemporaries, who used the observatory and the Camera Obscura to study and paint the Bristol landscape.
Create Centre		Bristol Harbour; 51.4462°N 2.6195°W	Bristol	Environment	The Create Centre includes an energy-saving eco house designed by Bruges Tozer and houses several organisations working in sustainable development, including the city council's sustainability teams. It is housed in half of the B Bond Warehouse which was a Bonded warehouse serving Bristol Harbour. It dates from 1908. It was designed by the Docks Committee engineer, and built by William Cowlin and Sons. It is made from reinforced concrete with a Welsh slate roof. The open plan building was created in two equal parts separated by central spine wall. It is nine storeys high and has an 18-window range. It was the first major building in Britain to use Edmond Coignet's reinforced concrete system.
Müller House Museum	-	Cotham; 51.4639°N 2.6000°W	Bristol	Biographical	website, life and work of Christian evangelist and orphanage director George Müller, located at the headquarters of The George Müller Charitable Trust. Records of all children who passed through the orphanage are held and may be inspected by relatives.
Georgian House		Clifton; 51.4526°N 2.6044°W	Bristol	Historic house	The Georgian House is open to the public and has been a branch of Bristol City Museum and Art Gallery, since it was presented to the city as a museum in 1937. It is a well-preserved example of a typical late 18th-century town house, which has been designated by English Heritage as a grade II* listed building. It was built around 1790 for John Pinney a successful sugar merchant. It was also home to Pinney's slave, Pero, after whom Pero's Bridge at Bristol Harbour is named. It contains some of the original furniture and fittings, such as the bureau-bookcase in the study and a rare cold water plunge bath, and has been used as a location for the BBC TV series A Respectable Trade, which was adapted from the book by Philippa Gregory, about the slave trade.
Glenside Hospital Museum		Fishponds; 51.4849°N 2.5430°W	Bristol	Medical	Glenside Museum is situated within the Glenside Campus of the University of the West of England. The museum is housed in a former chapel which was built in 1861 and is a grade II listed building. The museums collection consists of a wide range of paraphernalia, including several early Electroconvulsive therapy (ECT) machines and images from the life of Glenside Psychiatric Hospital (previously known as the Bristol Lunatic Asylum and later Beaufort War Hospital in World War I) and of the local Learning disability Hospitals of the Stoke Park Group and the Burden Neurological Institution. The museum has drawings and paintings by the accomplished artist Dennis Reed who painted images of life at Glenside during the 1950s.
Kings Weston Roman Villa		Lawrence Weston; 51.4973°N 2.6672°W	Bristol	Archaeology	Kings Weston Roman Villa is a Roman villa discovered during the construction of the Lawrence Weston housing estate in 1947. Two distinct buildings (Eastern and Western) were discovered, the Eastern building was fully excavated (in 1948–50), the other lies mostly below Long Cross road. Finds from the site are now held in the Bristol City Museum and Art Gallery. Traces of decorated walls, mosaic floors, underfloor heating and bath suites were discovered. Based on the dating of coins and other evidence such as a foundation burial of a young pig, it was suggested that the site had been occupied since the third century CE. The villa forms part of the collection of Bristol City Museum and Art Gallery.
M Shed		Bristol	Bristol	Multiple	website Opened in 2011, M Shed is situated on the site of the old Bristol Industrial Museum. Run by the city council, it has no entrance fee. The modern museum covers local history, transportation and industry in their 3 main galleries Bristol People, Bristol Life and Bristol Places. The museum has a few working exhibits such as the Portbury train and Fire- boat Pyronaut which can be ridden by the public. Guided tours around the L Shed, the store adjacent to M Shed, can be booked in the museum's reception and offers a deeper insight into Bristol's industrial and maritime past.
New Room		Broadmead; 51.4572°N 2.5886°W	Bristol	Religious	The New Room was built in 1739 by John Wesley and is the oldest Methodist chapel in the world. The chapel includes a double decker pulpit, which was common at the time, and an octagonal lantern window to reduce the amount paid in Window tax. In addition to meetings and worship the New Room was used a dispensary and schoolroom for the poor people of the area. The pews and benches were made from old ship timber. The courtyards around the building contain statues of John Wesley and his brother Charles. The John Snetzler Chamber Organ of 1761 is a 20th-century addition following the restoration of the building in 1929 by Sir George Oatley. It has been designated by English Heritage as a grade I listed building, and is the only piece of land in Broadmead for which the freehold has not been bought by Bristol City Council during expansion after World War II. It now includes a visitor centre.
Red Lodge Museum		Bristol city centre 51.4556°N 2.5996°W	Bristol	Historic house	The Red Lodge Museum is a branch of Bristol City Museum and Art Gallery and is open to the public. It was built in 1580 for John Yonge as a lodge for The Great House, which once stood on the site of the present Bristol Beacon. It was subsequently added to in Georgian times. It was altered around 1730, and restored in the early 20th century by CFW Dening. It is a grade I listed building. It has had several uses in its past, including the country's first girls' reform school managed by Mary Carpenter. Below the Lodge, and entered by a door under the stairs, are some of the cells thought to belong to the Carmelite Friary, the house and grounds of which were bought by Bristol Corporation upon the dissolution of the monasteries in 1538. The south-facing, walled garden is an excellent example of a re-created Elizabethan-style knot garden with herbaceous borders. The box hedge design is a replica of the pattern from the lodge's bedroom ceiling. All the plants grown here could have been found in English gardens by 1630.
Royal West of England Academy		Clifton; 51.4581°N 2.6084°W	Bristol	Art	The Royal West of England Academy (RWA) is an art gallery. It was financed by a donation of £2000 in the 1849 will of Ellen Sharples and a group of artists in Bristol, known as the Bristol Society of Artists, these were mostly landscape painters and many were well known such as William James Müller, Francis Danby, J.B. Pyne and John Syer. In 1844, when the Bristol Academy for the Promotion of Fine Arts was founded, the Bristol Society of Artists was incorporated into it. During World War II the Academy became the temporary home of various organisations including the Bristol Aeroplane Company and the U.S. Army. It was not until 1950 that the building was returned to its original function after the intervention of the then Prime Minister, Clement Attlee. Among the paintings in the permanent collection are works by artists from the Newlyn, St Ives and Bloomsbury Schools. Paintings by George Swaish, Matthew Hale, Anne Redpath, Mary Fedden, Carel Weight, Bernard Dunstan and Elizabeth Blackadder are also valued additions to the collection. The building is a grade II* listed building constructed in 1857. The interiors are by Charles Underwood and façade by JR Hirst, altered in 1912 by SS Reay and H Dare Bryan. The first floor is in 3 sections, the outer ones articulated by paired Corinthian pilasters flanking large shell head niches with statues of Flaxman and Reynolds. A large carving of 3 female figures crowns the parapet. The interior includes coloured marble.
SS Great Britain		Bristol Harbour; 51.4492°N 2.6084°W	Bristol	Maritime	The SS Great Britain was an advanced passenger steamship designed by Isambard Kingdom Brunel for the Great Western Steamship Company's transatlantic service between Bristol and New York City. While other ships had previously been built of iron or equipped with a screw propeller, Great Britain was the first to combine these features in a large ocean-going ship. When launched in 1843, Great Britain was by far the largest vessel afloat. However, her protracted construction and high cost had left her owners in a difficult financial position, and they were forced out of business in 1846 after the ship was stranded by a navigational error. Sold for salvage and repaired, Great Britain carried thousands of immigrants to Australia until converted to sail in 1881. Three years later, the vessel was retired to the Falkland Islands where she was utilised as a warehouse, quarantine ship and coal hulk until scuttled in 1937. In 1970, Great Britain was returned to the Bristol dry dock where she was first built. Now listed as part of the National Historic Fleet, the vessel is a visitor attraction and museum ship in Bristol Harbour, with between 150,000–170,000 visitors annually.

== Defunct museums ==
Name	Photograph	Suburb	County	Type	Summary
Bristol Industrial Museum		Bristol Harbour; 51.4473°N 2.5986°W	Bristol	Industrial	The Bristol Industrial Museum was a museum located on Prince's Wharf beside the Floating Harbour, which closed in 2006. On display were items from Bristol's industrial past – including aviation, car and bus manufacture, and printing – and exhibits documenting Bristol's maritime history. The museum was managed by Bristol City Council along with nearby preserved industrial relics along Prince's Wharf, including the Bristol Harbour Railway, cranes and a small fleet of preserved vessels. There are no plans to decommission or remove the railway, cranes or vessels. The museum closed its doors to the public on 29 October 2006. The new M Shed is being built on the site, keeping the same façade. which was open in spring 2011.
British Empire and Commonwealth Museum		Bristol Temple Meads railway station 51.4489°N 2.5835°W	Bristol	British Empire	The British Empire and Commonwealth Museum was a museum exploring the history of the British Empire and the effect of British colonial rule on the rest of the world. The museum opened in 2002 in Bristol's historic old railway station, designed by Isambard Kingdom Brunel. This Grade I listed building has been nominated as a World Heritage Site. The museum held the collection of artefacts of the Commonwealth Institute and was also the home of the New World Tapestry. On 23 November 2007 the museum announced it would be moving its core operations to London in 2008. The planned move to London did not take place, with the collections instead being transferred to Bristol Museum and Art Gallery and Bristol Archives in 2012. Work on the collections has been ongoing since 2015; the objects, photos and documents are now used in exhibitions and educational activities, and catalogued collections are available for research.
