= Diocesan magazines =

From the 1860s onwards a steadily increasing number of British dioceses, especially in the Church of England, began issuing publications containing a variety of news, comment and educational articles relating to their work. Similar examples were eventually added by a number of Roman Catholic dioceses and by various ecclesiastical denominations overseas.

== Early examples ==
The earliest regular example was seemingly the Diocesan Magazine introduced about 1867 in the Anglican diocese of Lichfield (also incidentally the centre for some of the earliest parish magazines). This was during the episcopate of bishop John Lonsdale. However it seems mainly to have been a localised version of a separate magazine, Mission Life. No complete surviving copies of this early diocesan magazine are known to exist in any repository. Copies of Mission Life (1866-1869) and a new series (1870-1886) are held by the British Library. There had previously been a short-lived Oxford Parochial Magazine, but this had been neither published by nor centred on the diocese.

During the Victorian era such publications were frequently named as the Diocesan Gazette or simply as the Diocesan Magazine. From the early 20th century many dioceses began to produce shorter monthly news bulletins or leaflets, often designed for possible inclusion as an insert within the local parish magazine. These could either replace the older magazines (sometimes being quite similar to some of the less ambitious gazettes) or alternatively might be ancillary to them.

Occasionally the introduction of a new diocesan gazette might attract scepticism or controversy: in London diocese there were complaints of early high-handed techniques being used in efforts to increase their circulation.

== Format and content ==
The Bishoprick: quarterly magazine of Durham diocese, volume 28 no. 4, August 1953. With 32 pages including advertising, its contents included three letters or recent addresses from the bishop; details of the Church Assembly and Diocesan Conference; news from the local deaneries; faculties granted; Petertide ordinations, and clerical appointments and obituaries.

Formats, layouts and titles have however changed over the years to reflect the changing needs and circumstances of the church. Many of the earliest titles have now ceased publication, usually being replaced by new ventures meeting more modern needs. Some of these have now adopted a more popular newspaper-type style.

Typical contents of the earlier magazines would include a pastoral letter from a bishop or another senior clergyman; theological reflections; particulars of the bishop's engagements during the coming month; comments on recent national or local news; details of forthcoming events and meetings; and particulars of recent clerical appointments. They were not always well regarded: one writer commented regarding diocesan leaflets in 1949: Unfortunately, most of these must be classed as dull productions and some … contribute little to the Christian cause and may even have a negative influence. As with the parish magazine the trouble seems to be a style of writing and a format which repels rather than attracts. But there is some excuse for the Diocesan Leaflet as many of them are written primarily for the clergy, to give them news of conferences, retreats and other events … It would be better to supply the clergy with their news in mimeograph form and devote all the Leaflet space to news of interest to the laity.

There was some gradual increase in the use of engravings and photographs, particularly after the technological improvements in the 1890s, including halftone reproduction of illustrations and the introduction of offset printing.

== Location of copies ==
Surviving examples of many of these publications can often be traced in libraries or in the episcopal collections held by the local county record office or county archive service (which today usually serves as the principal diocesan record office). Since a lot of them were included as insets within parish magazines of differing dates, many of the back issues surviving today are included within incomplete sets.

The British Library also holds many examples, although their integrated online catalogue suggests that their overall coverage is still patchy. They do, however, also hold some magazines from Irish dioceses and from other overseas dioceses.

In recent years an increasing number of dioceses have been publishing alternative versions of their latest periodicals in an online format.

== Some past and present periodicals: Anglican dioceses in UK and Ireland ==
=== England and Wales ===
Diocese	Periodical	Status	Est. date	End date	Notes	Ref(s)
Bangor	Bangor Diocesan Gazette	Discontinued	1954	?	Founded under bishop John Charles Jones.	
Bangor	Nexus	Active			Online diocesan magazine.	
Bath and Wells	Bath & Wells Diocesan Gazette				Some copies 1906-1954 (at least) in Somerset Record Office.	
Bath and Wells	Manna	Active	Sep 2010		Quarterly magazine including online version.	
Bath and Wells	Ruridecanal Diocesan and Parish Magazine	Discontinued	1883	c. 1917		
Birmingham	Birmingham Diocesan Magazine	Discontinued	Jan 1906	c. 1923	Messenger of the Bishop and a monthly record of church work in the diocese; edited by the Rev. Canon Hobhouse. Last issue: vol. 18, no. 12.	
Birmingham	Birmingham Diocesan Magazine	Discontinued	Jan 1924	Dec 1929	New series; last issue: vol. 6, no. 66.	
Birmingham	Diocesan Magazine		1905		Established the year of the creation of the diocese. Appeared initially as the Worcester & Birmingham Diocesan Magazine.	
Blackburn	The Crosier	Discontinued	1949	1964		
Blackburn	Manchester and Blackburn Diocesan Magazine		1927		Continuation of Manchester Diocesan Magazine.	
Blackburn	See	Active	2010s			
Blackburn	The See of Blackburn	Active	1965			
Bradford	The Bishop's Messenger/Bradford Diocesan Messenger	Discontinued			Before 1946-1956. Available at the North Riding Record Office online catalogue.	
Bradford	Bradford Diocesan News	Discontinued	1957	2000s		
Bradford	NewsRound	Active			Online from 2010.	
Bristol	Bristol Diocesan Gazette	Discontinued	Jan 1922	Jun 1972	Last issue: vol 50, no. 606.	
Bristol	Bristol Diocesan Magazine	Discontinued	Jan 1899	Dec 1921	Last issue: vol. 23, no. 276.	
Bristol	The Bristol Diocesan Review	Discontinued	Jan 1922	Dec 1931	New series. Started at vol. 24, no.1; ended at vol. 33, no. 120.	
Canterbury	Canterbury Diocesan Gazette		1892		The official organ of the Archbishop of Canterbury.	
Canterbury	Diocesan Gazette		1892			
Carlisle	Carlisle Diocesan Gazette	Discontinued	March 1907	Dec 1951		
Carlisle	Carlisle Diocesan News/The News	Active	Jan 1952		Four-page magazine insert.	
Carlisle	Diocesan Gazette		1896	1952	Vol. 34 issued by 1930; issues 1898-1941 held in Cumbria Record Office, Carlisle.	
Carlisle	The Way	Active	c. 1994		Originally The Way in Cumbria; a colour newspaper subsequently expanded to include other denominations within the county, three times yearly (Easter, Summer & Christmas).	
Chelmsford	East Window	Discontinued	Nov 1987	Sept 2006	Last issue: no. 227.	
Chelmsford	Essex Churchman	Discontinued	July 1952	Oct 1987	Last issue: no. 425.	
Chelmsford	The Month	Active			Online magazine.	
Chelmsford	St. Albans & Chelmsford Diocesan Gazette	Discontinued			Vol. 19. nos. 3-12. were issued between March and December 1914.	
Chester	The Chester Diocesan Gazette	Discontinued			No. 191 issued c. January 1902.	
Chester	Diocesan Gazette		By 1891			
Chichester	Chichester Diocesan Gazette	Discontinued	Jan 1902	Dec 1946	Vol. 9, no. 97 issued in January 1902; vol. 20, no. 75 issued in December 1946.	
Chichester	Chichester Diocesan Leaflet	Discontinued	Jan 1947	Dec 1987	Last issue: vol. 41, no. 12.	
Chichester	Chichester Diocesan Leaflet	Discontinued	1988	2003		
Chichester	Chichester Magazine	Active	2010s		Bi-monthly, online.	
Diocese of Coventry	Coventry Diocesan Gazette	Active	1940s			
Derby	Derby Diocesan Leaflet	Discontinued	Jan 1932	July 1947	Last issue: vol. 16, no. 7.	
Derby	Derby Diocesan News	Active	Aug 1947			
Derby	See of Derby Diocesan Magazine	Discontinued	Jan 1928	Dec 1931	Last issue: vol. 4, no. 48.	
Durham	The Bishoprick		By 1924		Vol. 28 reached by 1953.	
Durham	Diocesan Gazette		By 1887			
Ely	Ely Diocesan Gazette	Discontinued	1916	1960s?	Continuation of the Ely Diocesan Remembrancer.	
Ely	Ely Ensign	Discontinued		2007	Discussed at Diocesan Synod (10 March 2007).	
Ely	Ely Diocesan Remembrancer	Discontinued	May 1885	Dec 1915	Continued as Ely Diocesan Gazette.	
Exeter	Exeter Diocesan Gazette	Discontinued			Some monthly examples (1902–1911) available in the Devon Record Office.	
Exeter	Exeter Diocesan Leaflet	Discontinued	1949	1982	Monthly; replaced by Exeter Diocesan News.	
Exeter	Exeter Diocesan Magazine	Active	By 2009		Available from the Devon Record Office, Exeter.	
Exeter	Exeter Diocesan News	Active	1983		Monthly.	
Gloucester	Diocesan Magazine				37 volumes (1906 to 1942) at Gloucestershire Archives.	
Gloucester	Gloucester Diocesan Gazette		Jan 1947			
Gloucester	Our Diocese of Gloucester	Active	2010		Online bulletin.	
Guildford	Guildford Diocesan Gazette/Guildford Diocesan Herald/Guildford Herald	Discontinued	1928	2006		
Guildford	Guildford Diocesan News/Diocesan Leaflet	Discontinued	1952	1988	Copies at Surrey History Centre.	
Guildford	The Wey	Active	2007			
Hereford	Hereford Diocesan News	Discontinued	Jan 1965			
Hereford	The NEWSpaper	Active			Quarterly, 24 pages; also “available online in its entirety”.	
Leicester	Leicester Diocesan Leaflet	Active	1927			
Leicester	News and Views: Leicester Diocesan Magazine					
Lichfield	Diocesan Magazine	Discontinued	By 1868		No complete surviving copies of this early version are known to exist. It seems to have been a localised version of the Mission Life magazine, with early editions being published or printed at Derby by Bemrose & Sons. No full copies in British Library, nor with County Archive or Library services in Staffordshire.	
Lichfield	Lichfield Diocesan Churchman	Discontinued	c. 1872	1879	Incomplete series (1873-1875) held by William Salt Library, Stafford; 1876-1879 held by Derbyshire Record Office.	
Lichfield	Lichfield Diocesan Magazine	Discontinued	Jan 1880			
Lichfield	Lichfield Diocesan Magazine	Discontinued	1880	?	Monthly record of church work for the diocese. Vol. 4, no. 1 issued in January 1883); vol. 5, no. 12 issued in December 1884.	
Lincoln	Diocesan Magazine		By 1886			
Lincoln	Lincoln Diocesan Magazine				Vol. 18, no. 198 issued in 1902; vol. 92, no. 12 issued in 1976.	
Liverpool	Diocesan Gazette		By 1882			
Liverpool	Diocesan leaflet		Late 1940s		Described as a better style … printed in Crown 8vo size instead of the more common quarto size, it has eight pages of good readable type, mostly in double columns, with ample white space between the paragraphs and good titling.	
Liverpool	Liverpool Review/[Liverpool Diocesan Review]				Vol. 5 issued in 1930.	
Llandaff	Diocesan Magazine		March 1899		Quarterly.	
Llandaff	Llandaff Diocesan Magazine	Discontinued	1899		Quarterly record, editor: The Rev. C. E. T. Griffith. [vol. 1. no. 2-4: the Rev. W. A. Downing, no. 5, etc.] vol. 1. no. 2-vol. 11. no. 3. June 1899-Oct. 1919. Later issues also in National Library of Wales.	
London	Diocesan Magazine		By 1887			
London	London Diocesan Leaflet		Jan 1928	Dec 1949	Last issue: vol. 22, no. 12.	
London	London Diocesan Magazine	Discontinued	May 1886	Dec 1927		
Manchester	Crux	Active			Online version available.	
Manchester	Manchester and Blackburn Diocesan Magazine	Discontinued	1927	1928	Continuation of Manchester Diocesan Magazine; continued as Manchester Churchman.	
Manchester	Manchester Churchman	Discontinued	1928	1930	Continuation of Manchester and Blackburn Diocesan Magazin; continued as Manchester Diocesan Leaflet (1931).	
Manchester	Manchester Diocesan Churchman		Oct 1879			
Manchester	Manchester Diocesan Leaflet		1931	?	Continuation of Manchester Churchman.	
Manchester	Manchester Diocesan Magazine		Before 1904		Edited by the Rev. Harold J. Smith from 1904.	
Manchester	Manchester Diocesan Magazine	Discontinued		Before 1927	Continued as Manchester and Blackburn Diocesan Magazine	
Monmouth	Diocesan Newsletter	Active			Online.	
Monmouth	Monmouth Diocesan Gazette	Discontinued	1960s	1960s	Continued as Monmouth Diocesan Newsletter.	
Monmouth	Monmouth Diocesan Newsletter		1968	?	Continuation of Monmouth Diocesan Gazette; in National Library of Wales catalogues.	
Newcastle	Newcastle Diocesan Gazette	Discontinued	1899	?		
Newcastle	Newcastle Diocesan Gazette	Discontinued	1907	After 1926	Available at the Northumberland County Archives Service.	
Norwich	Diocesan Gazette		By 1894		Vol. 9 had been reached by 1903.	
Oxford	Diocesan Magazine		1868		Favourably mentioned by a correspondent to "Reading Mercury", 21 March 1868. "Published by Messrs. Macintosh" and containing "a large amount of very interesting Missionary Intelligence"; further commended by the diocesan bishop.	
Oxford	Diocesan Magazine		1902			
Oxford	The Door		20th century			
Oxford	Oxford Parochial Magazine / The Oxford Parochial Magazine and Monthly Diocesan Record / The Oxford Magazine & Church Advocate	Discontinued	1860	Before 1864	Available in part from Google eBookstore; volumes 1-3 (1860–63) in British Library catalogue. Publishers: London, E Thompson, 3 Burleigh Street, Strand; Oxford, W R Bowden. Not diocesan-based, but the editors explained: several newspapers and reviews having assumed from our title that the "Oxford Parochial Magazine" is intended for local circulation only, we think it necessary to explain that this is not at all the present design of the conductors … the conductors wish to have it understood that Oxford is the locality of its origin and that its principles and tone are those of the Established Church … The Oxford Parochial Magazine is published with the intention of providing for Church People in the middle ranks of Society a Monthly Publication of first-class literary character and consistent religious principles …. Church Magazines which have been published hitherto have been almost exclusively adopted for young people.	
Peterborough	Diocesan Magazine	Discontinued	Jan 1889	Dec 1920	Monthly record of Church work for the Diocese; last issue: vol. 32, no. 384.	
Peterborough	Peterborough Diocesan Leaflet		1921			
Portsmouth	Portsmouth Diocesan Courier		1962			
Portsmouth	Portsmouth Diocesan Gazette		1928			
Portsmouth	Portsmouth Diocesan News				Vol. 16, no. 1 issued in January 1956.	
Ripon	Diocesan Gazette		By 1898			
Ripon	Ripon Diocesan Gazette	Discontinued		Before 1911	Vol. 13, no.1 issued in January 1902; vol. 21, no. 12 issued in December 1910.	
Ripon	Ripon Diocesan Gazette	Discontinued	Jan 1911	Dec 1927	New series. Nos. 1–204.	
Ripon	Ripon Diocesan News	Discontinued	Jan 1959	Dec 1966	no. 1-95. Jan. 1959-Dec. 1966.	
Rochester	Diocesan Gazette		By 1896			
Rochester	Diocesan News Letter				no. 136-?. Jan. 1951-?	
Rochester	Rochester Diocesan Notes	Discontinued	1929	1950	no. 1-135 (with gaps)	
St Albans	St. Albans & Chelmsford Diocesan Gazette				Vol. 19. no. 3-12 issued March-December 1914.	
St Albans	St Albans Diocesan Gazette	Discontinued	Before 1904	Before 1915	Vol. 9 issued by 1904.	
St Albans	St Albans Diocesan Gazette	Discontinued	Jan 1915	Dec 1927	New series.	
St Asaph	St Asaph Diocesan News				Issued after 1970 available in the National Library of Wales.	
St Asaph	Teulu St Asaph	Active	2007		Online magazine.	
St Davids	Diocesan Gazette & Ruridecanal Chronicle		Aug 1900		Quarterly.	
St Davids	Esgobaeth Ty Ddewi Taflen Yr Esgobaeth/Diocese of St Davids Diocesan Leaflet		c. 1976		Quarterly.	
St Davids	Pobl Dewi	Active	Dec 2003		Quarterly newspaper.	
St Edmundsbury & Ipswich	Diocesan Magazine		c. 1914		Volume xxi issued by 1935. Specially commended during the late 1940s as being very well printed, newsy in the right way, and with an excellent cover ... Incidentally it carries quite a lot of advertisements and is sold for 2d, a price at which no one can cavil at if value is given.	
St Edmundsbury & Ipswich	East Anglican Magazine	Active			Online; no. 118 issued by November 2011.	
Salisbury	Salisbury Diocesan Gazette	Discontinued	March 1888	Nov/Dec 1947	Final issue: vol. 60, no. 694.	
Sheffield	Sheffield Diocesan Gazette		1914			
Sodor & Man	Manx Church Magazine		c. 1890		Vol. xiv issued by 1904.	
Southwark	Southwark Diocesan Gazette		1905			
Southwell	Diocesan Magazine		By June 1888			
Southwell	Southwell Diocesan Magazine		1888			
Southwell	Southwell Diocesan News		By 1950s		Leaflet.	
Swansea & Brecon	Diocesan Leaflet/Diocesan News		1970s		Available in National Library of Wales.	
Swansea & Brecon	Diocesan News	Active	2010s			
Truro	The Church in Cornwall		By 1878		Introduced under bishop Edward White Benson by 1878; 1872-1883 available in British Library.	
Truro	Truro Diocesan Gazette		By 1926		Available at the Cornwall Record Office.	
Truro	Truro Diocesan Magazine				A monthly record of church work for the diocese. Vol. I-III were edited by Augustus Blair Donaldson. Vol. IV and others were edited by Arthur John Worlledge.	
Wakefield	Awake	Active	2004			
Wakefield	The Flame	Discontinued	2002	Apr 2004		
Wakefield	See-Link	Discontinued	1990	2002		
Wakefield	Wakefield Diocesan Gazette	Discontinued			Vol. 19, no. 3 issued by 1913	
Wakefield	Wakefield Diocesan News	Discontinued	1968	?		
Winchester	Winchester Diocesan Magazine		By 1899		Proposed 1890 and operational by 1899.	
Worcester	Worcester Diocesan Magazine / Worcester [Worcester and Birmingham] Diocesan Magazine	Discontinued	Oct 1893	Dec 1933	Final issue: vol. 40, no. 12.	
York	Diocesan Magazine		By 1892		Still issued in the 1970s.	
York	York Diocesan Gazette	Discontinued			Published under the direction of the Archbishop. Vol. 20, no. 1 issued in January 1911; vol. 38, no. 12 issued in December 1929.	
York	York Diocesan Magazine	Discontinued			Vol. 5, no. 7 issued in July 1896; vol. 19, no. 12 issued in December 1910.	

=== Ireland ===
Diocese	Periodical	Status	Est. date	End date	Notes	Ref(s)
Armagh	The Ambassador	Active	2008		Continuation of Diocesan Magazine.	
Armagh	Diocesan Magazine	Discontinued		Before 2008	Vol. 11/4, April 1978; replaced by The Ambassador (2008).	
Clogher	Clogher Diocesan magazine		Jan 1967		Description based on: Vol. 12, no. 11 (Nov. 1979).	
Cork, Cloyne & Ross	Diocesan Magazine		Jan 1976			
Dublin & Glendalough	Diocesan Magazine				No. 41 published in January 1978.	
Meath & Kildare	Meath and Kildare Diocesan Magazine	Discontinued	Jan 1975	Dec 1977		
Meath & Kildare	Meath and Kildare Diocesan Magazine		1978			
Ossory, Ferns & Leighlin	Diocesan magazine		c. 1926?	Sept 1982	Vol. 52, no. 1 issued in January 1977. Final isuse: vol. 57, no. 9, with some exceptions.	

=== Scotland ===
Diocese	Periodical	Status	Est. date	End date	Notes	Ref(s)
All dioceses	Inspires	Active	After 2004		Quarterly newspaper issued by the Scottish Episcopal Church which included contributions from all seven dioceses; continuation of The Scottish Episcopalian.	
All dioceses	The Scottish Episcopalian	Discontinued		2004	Quarterly newspaper issued by the Scottish Episcopal Church which included contributions from all seven dioceses; continued as Inspires.	
Argyll & The Isles	News and Views from around the Diocese	Active	c. 1980		Quarterly includes Bishop's Diary and also contributions from individual congregations. No. 22 issued in Autumn 1985.	
Brechin	Brechin Bulletin	Active	2009		Monthly periodical.	
Brechin	Grapevine	Active	2009		Monthly periodical.	
St Andrews, Dunkeld and Dunblane	Diocesan Quarterly				No. 56 issued in 1964; no. 72 issued in 1968.	

== Some Roman Catholic diocesan periodicals ==
Diocese	Periodical	Status	Est. date	End date	Notes	Ref(s)
Cardiff	Diocesan Newspaper					
East Anglia	Catholic East Anglia	Active	1984			
Lancaster	Catholic Voice of Lancaster	Active			Free monthly newspaper; no. 221 issued by July 2010	
Middlesbrough	Middlesbrough Voice	Active	1981			
Nottingham	Nottingham Catholic News	Active	1995			
Plymouth	Catholic South West Newspaper	Active	1995			
Westminster	Westminster Record	Active	1990s		Diocesan magazine, volume 2-, 1994-date.	

Other current Roman Catholic diocesan newspapers are listed on the website of the Catholic Church in England and Wales.
