= Méric Casaubon =

English classical scholar (1599–1671)

Line Engraving of Meric Casaubon by Pieter Stevens van Gunst, after Adriaen van der Werff, published 1709

Meric Casaubon (14 August 1599 – 14 July 1671) was an English classical scholar. He was the first to translate the Meditations of Marcus Aurelius into English. He was the son of Isaac Casaubon.

Although biographical dictionaries (including the Encyclopædia Britannica Eleventh Edition) commonly accentuate his name to Méric, he himself did not do so.

== Life ==
Meric Casaubon was born in Geneva to a French father, scholar Isaac Casaubon; he was named for his godfather Meric de Vic. After education in Sedan, at an early age he joined his father in England, and completed his education at Eton College and Christ Church, Oxford (B.A. 1618; M.A. 1621; D.D. 1636).

His defence of his father against the attacks of certain Catholics (Pietas contra maledicos patrii Nominis et Religionis Hostes, 1621), secured him the notice and favour of James I, who conferred upon him a prebendal stall in Canterbury Cathedral (stall IX) which he held from 1628 to his death. He also vindicated his father's literary reputation against certain impostors who had published, under his name, a work on The Origin of Idolatry (Vindicatio Patris adversus Impostores, 1624).

During the English Civil War he was deprived of his benefices and his prebendal stall at Canterbury Cathedral and retired to Oxford refusing to acknowledge the authority of Oliver Cromwell, who, notwithstanding, requested him to write an impartial history of the events of the period. In spite of the tempting inducements held out, he declined, and also refused the post of inspector of the Swedish universities offered him by Queen Christina. After the Restoration, he was reinstated in his benefice and his stall in Canterbury and devoted the rest of his life to literary work. He died at Canterbury and is buried in the cathedral. His coin collection was incorporated into that of Canon John Bargrave.

Casaubon's reputation was overshadowed by that of his father; but his editions of numerous classical authors, especially of the Meditations of Marcus Aurelius, were especially valued, and reprinted several times (but by modern standards, his translation is difficult reading). He had an interest in the study of Anglo-Saxon, which he shared with his lifelong "trustie frend" William Somner. Edward Stillingfleet, whom Casaubon admired, bought many of his books, which are now in Archbishop Marsh's Library, Dublin. Some other volumes from his library came into Canterbury Cathedral Library through William Somner.

== Controversy ==
In A Treatise Concerning Enthusiasme (1655), Casaubon wrote against enthusiasm, and circumscribed the domain of the supernatural. The next year he produced an edition of John Dee, portraying him as having had dealings with the Devil. The background is of orthodox Anglicans wishing to discredit the sectarian Protestants of the period; but also to validate the existence of spirits to atheists. Casaubon was in touch with Nicholas Bernard about the Dee manuscript. Following the Restoration, Casaubon wrote supporting the traditional theories of witchcraft. He was in fact operating on several fronts: as well as attacking those who would deny the supernatural entirely, and limiting the role of reason in faith, he defended humanist learning against the claims for the new natural philosophy, emanating from figures in the Royal Society who saw it as completely replacing the old learning.

== Benefices ==
- 1626–1630: rector of Bleadon, Somerset
- 1628–1671: prebendal stall IX at Canterbury Cathedral
- 1630–1634: rector of St Mary in the Marsh, Kent
- 1634–1634: rector of Old Romney, Kent
- 1634–1662: vicar of Minster, Kent
- 1634–1662: vicar of Monkton with Birchington, Kent
- 1643/44: ejected from his benefices by Parliament
- 1660: reinstated to the living at Minster
- 1662–1671: rector of Ickham, Kent

== Family ==
Casaubon married Frances Harrison of Hampshire in about 1628. His wife's grandfather was William Barlow, who had been a canon of Winchester Cathedral since 1581. The couple had seven children, most of whom were born in Canterbury, but only two lived to maturity:

- John Casaubon (1636-1692) was a country 'surgeon' who practised in and around the Canterbury area. He kept a diary of some of his cases and family matters. It ends with the self-diagnosis of the oesophageal cancer which finally caused his death. The diary is kept at Southampton Archives.
- Anne Casaubon (c. 1649-1686) was the last child to be born. She married a country parson named John Dauling, who was also the executor of Casaubon's will.

Frances Casaubon died on 24 February 1652 in London. Her poor health and death was one of the reasons Meric gave for not complying with Oliver Cromwell's request.

== Works ==
- Pietas contra maledicos patrii Nominis et Religionis Hostes (1621)
- Vindicatio Patris adversus Impostores (1624)
- As translator: Marcus Aurelius Antoninus the Roman Emperor, his Meditations Concerning Himself (1634, 1673)
- A treatise of use and custome (1638)
- De quatuor linguis commentationis, pars prior: quae, de lingua Hebraica: et, de lingua Saxonica (1650)
- A Treatise Concerning Enthusiasme (London: Thomas Johnson, 1655).
- A Treatise Concerning Enthusiasme, facsimile ed., introd. Paul J. Korshin, 1970, Scholars' Facsimiles & Reprints, ISBN 978-0-8201-1077-6.
- A true and faithful relation of what passed for many years between Dr. John Dee and Some Spirits (1659)
- Of the Necessity of Reformation (1664)
- On Credulity and Incredulity in Things natural, civil and divine (1668)
- A Letter of Meric Casaubon to Peter du Moulin Concerning Natural Experimental Philosophie (1669). Facsimile ed., introd. David J. Lougee, 1977, Scholars' Facsimiles & Reprints, ISBN 0-8201-1284-4.
- A Treatise Proving Spirits, Witches, and Supernatural Operations, by Pregnant Instances and Evidences: Together with other Things worthy of Note (London: Brabazon Aylmer, 1672)
- Generall Learning: A Seventeenth-Century Treatise on the Formation of the General Scholar (ed. Richard Serjeantson, 1999)
