= The Record of the Blue Mountains =

Newspaper published in Katoomba, New South Wales

The Record of the Blue Mountains was a newspaper published in Katoomba, New South Wales from 1921 to 1925.

== History ==
The Record of the Blue Mountains began in August 1921 as The Catholic News of the Blue Mountains, a monthly published by the Katoomba Catholic Club. Outgrowing its role as a parish bulletin and widening its appeal to include the non-Catholic community, the name was changed from July 1922 (Vol.1, No. 12). By July 1923 it had achieved a circulation of 6,000 readers between Bathurst and Sydney. While its editors included M. Curran, John F. Ryan and Bruce Milliss, the driving force behind The Record was Katoomba parish priest, Father St. Clair Joseph Bridge. A further name change occurred in April 1924, when the name was shortened to The Record Magazine. Financial difficulties and pressure from the Church hierarchy to concentrate on parish affairs eventually forced Bridge to close The Record. The last issue, volume 4, number 6, appeared in January 1925.

Though registered as a newspaper, The Record was, and saw itself as, more a magazine than a newspaper. In his autobiography, Serpent’s Tooth, Milliss’ son Roger describes the journal as consisting of “a minimum of low-key Catholic propaganda and a mass of inoffensive general features aimed to attract a broader readership and quell the prejudice of likely Protestant advertisers”.

== Digitisation ==
The Record of the Blue Mountains has been digitised as part of the Australian Newspapers Digitisation Program project of the National Library of Australia.

== See also ==
- List of newspapers in New South Wales
- List of newspapers in Australia
