= Lebrecht =

Lebrecht or Leberecht may refer to:

- Lebrecht, Prince of Anhalt-Köthen (1622-1669), a German prince of the House of Ascania
- Lebrecht, Prince of Anhalt-Zeitz-Hoym (1669-1727), a German prince of the House of Ascania
- Lebrecht Blücher Dreves (1816-1870), a German poet and translator of poetry from Hamburg
- Gebhard Leberecht von Blücher (1742–1819), a Prussian field marshal
- Carl Lebrecht Udo Dammer (1860-1920), a German botanist
- Dieter-Lebrecht Koch (born 1953), a German politician and Member of the European Parliament for Thuringia
- Emmanuel Lebrecht, Prince of Anhalt-Köthen (1671-1704), a German prince of the House of Ascania
- Guillaume-Lebrecht Petzold (early 19th century), a piano maker in Paris
- Karl George Lebrecht, Prince of Anhalt-Köthen (1730-1789), a German prince of the House of Ascania
- Leonard Lebrecht Friedman (born 1976), an American football player
- Norman Lebrecht (born 1948), a British commentator on music and cultural affairs and a novelist
- Lebrecht Photo Library, a picture library was set up in 1992 by Elbie Lebrecht who worked as a specialist librarian, publishing editor and sculptor
