= Katherine Bayley's School =

Location
- Coventry; England

Information
- Established: 1733
- Founder: Francis Blythe
- Closed: 1889

Katherine Bayley's School (also known as Mrs. Bayley's Charity School) was a school for boys (and, initially, girls) in Coventry, England, established in 1733.

The school was created and endowed thanks to a bequest "to be devoted to the education of children in reading, writing and accounting" from Katherine Bayley, who died aged 52 on 20 February 1730. Her executor Francis Blythe used the money to establish the school, which he named after her.

It originally operated in a house near Drapers' Hall, but in 1822 moved into Bayley's former home on Little Park St. A new building was added in 1842. The school closed in 1889.

Documents relating to the school are preserved in Coventry Archives.

== Masters ==
- Joseph Plant (1733-1774)
- Edward Barratt (1774-1776)
- Richard Ireland (1776-1781)
- Edward Reynolds (1781-1800)
- Thomas Hall (1800-1896)
- Francis Marson (1806-1842)
- John Henry Fretton (1842-1856)
- William George Fretton (1856-1889; son of his predecessor)
