= Cheshire Record Office =

English county record office and diocesan record office

Coordinates: 53.187°N 2.888°W

The Cheshire Record Office is the county record office and diocesan record office for Cheshire. It houses the Cheshire Archives and Local Studies Service (formerly Cheshire and Chester Archives and Local Studies Service). Since 1986 it has been based in Duke Street, Chester, but from 2027 this site will be replaced by new buildings at Lightfoot Street in Chester, and at Prince Albert Street in Crewe.
