= Parish magazine =

Periodical published by an ecclesiastical, generally Anglican community

A parish magazine or parish bulletin, also called church bulletin, is a periodical produced by and for an ecclesiastical parish. It usually comprises a mixture of religious articles, community contributions, and parish notices, including the previous month‘s christenings, marriages, and funerals. Magazines are sold or are otherwise circulated amongst the parishioners of the relevant church or village. They are almost invariably produced by volunteers, usually working alongside the resident clergy. From their earliest days they have frequently been augmented by the inclusion of a nationally-produced magazine supplement or a regionally produced insert, such as a diocesan news leaflet or similar publication (and sometimes they might include both). It has been estimated that the collective readership of parish magazines exceeds that of many national newspapers.

== Early history ==
Parish magazines were arguably foreshadowed by the sporadic printed notices or pastoral letters, issued to the local community by parish clergy or by the more senior clergy and found very occasionally amongst 19th-century parish archives. However the first regular parish magazine is generally recognised as being started in January 1859 by Rev. John Erskine Clarke, Vicar of St Michael's, Derby. (Rival claims have sometimes been made for Rev. W. J. E. Bennett's Old Church Porch, issued at Frome in 1854.) Erskine Clarke had prepared a number of publications which were particularly aimed at children and which were designed to counteract the commercial publications then appearing. He later produced a sixteen-page periodical, which bore on the page headings the literal title The Parish Magazine. It contained general interest material, often with a strong moralising edge. The idea was that this inset should be offered to parishes to include within their own localised covers, which would very often comprise no more than four printed pages.

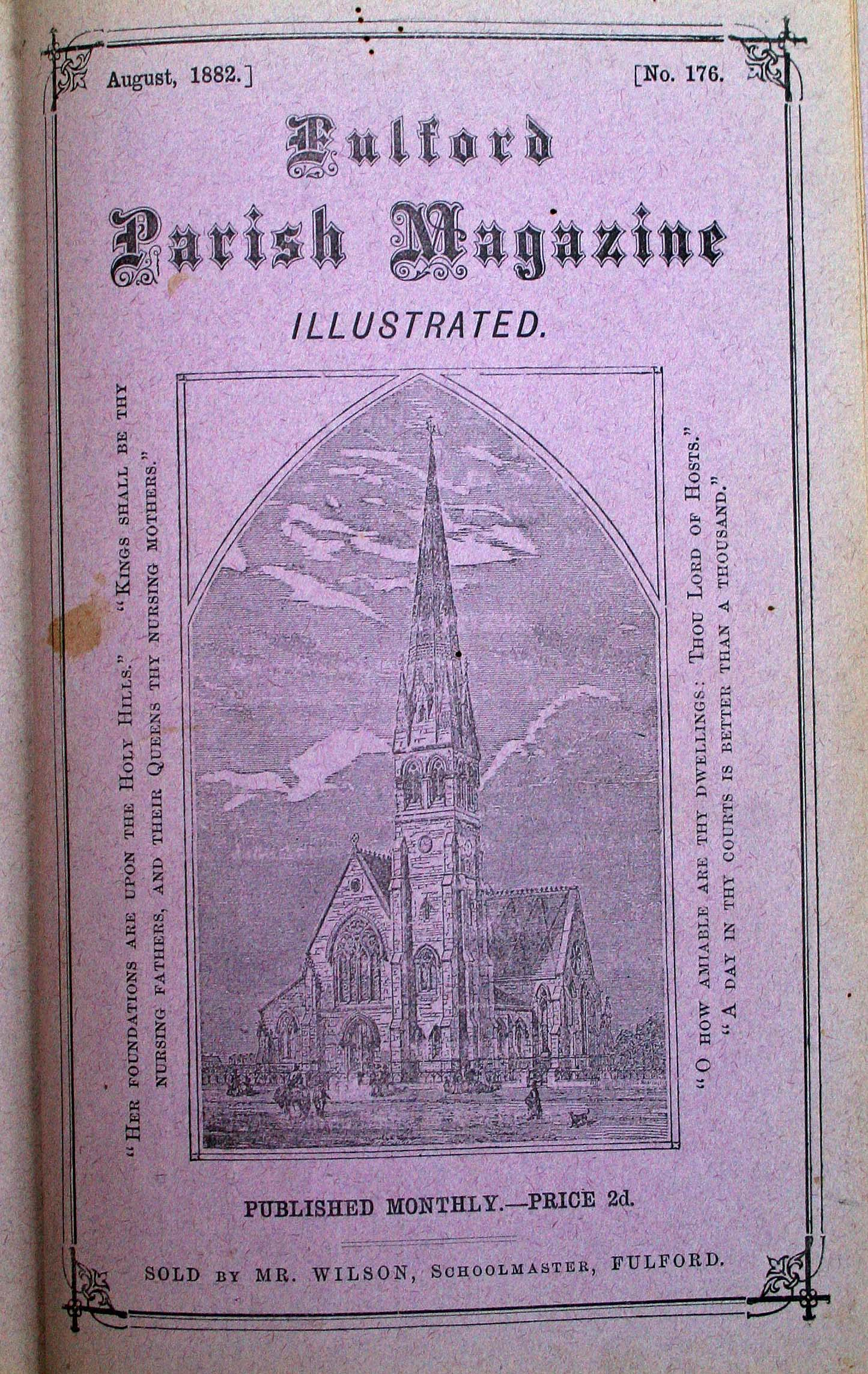
Fulford (York) parish magazine, August 1882, from a bound annual volume

Starting with fifty-four parishes, the circulation of the Parish Magazine was eventually extended to over two hundred churches. Whilst Clarke’s inset continued to appear until 1895, competitors soon emerged and it was eventually overtaken by other alternatives. Many publishers began to produce rival insets - over thirty such examples have been described and listed. The last two of these national examples, Home Words and The Sign finally merged in 2009. For an analysis of these insets up to 1918 see Jane Platt, '"A sweet, saintly Christian business"? The Anglican Parish Magazine, 1859-1918' (Lancaster University PhD thesis, 2010). One or two of the earlier insets had also been produced on a regional or diocesan basis. Eventually the assortment of Diocesan Magazines which were increasingly appearing in many areas would often include a short monthly news bulletin in a design which could similarly be included as a parish magazine inset.

Many parishes nevertheless have at different times opted to issue periodicals produced entirely from within their own community and not including any of the mass-produced insets. Being largely dependent on volunteers, they have often varied their format according to local circumstances, and in some parishes they have seemingly had a rather intermittent existence. Where insets were included, these might often have originated at completely different dates from their cover magazines, or else have been merely the short-term choices of particular local editors. This makes it highly likely that most surviving collections of insets will be incomplete.

== Later format and content ==
Where parishes opted to go it alone they clearly had to rely on locally-written material of variable quality. In fact throughout the years a significant variety of different formats will be found. A great many magazines have been redesigned, renamed or relaunched to reflect changing circumstances, or else they have been revived after an apparent hiatus. The earliest magazines had to be printed using expensive movable type methods. However from the 1900s onwards the invention of the stencil duplicator or mimeograph - frequently known as the Gestetner machine or Roneo machine - offered cheaper alternatives, which many editors were soon to adopt.

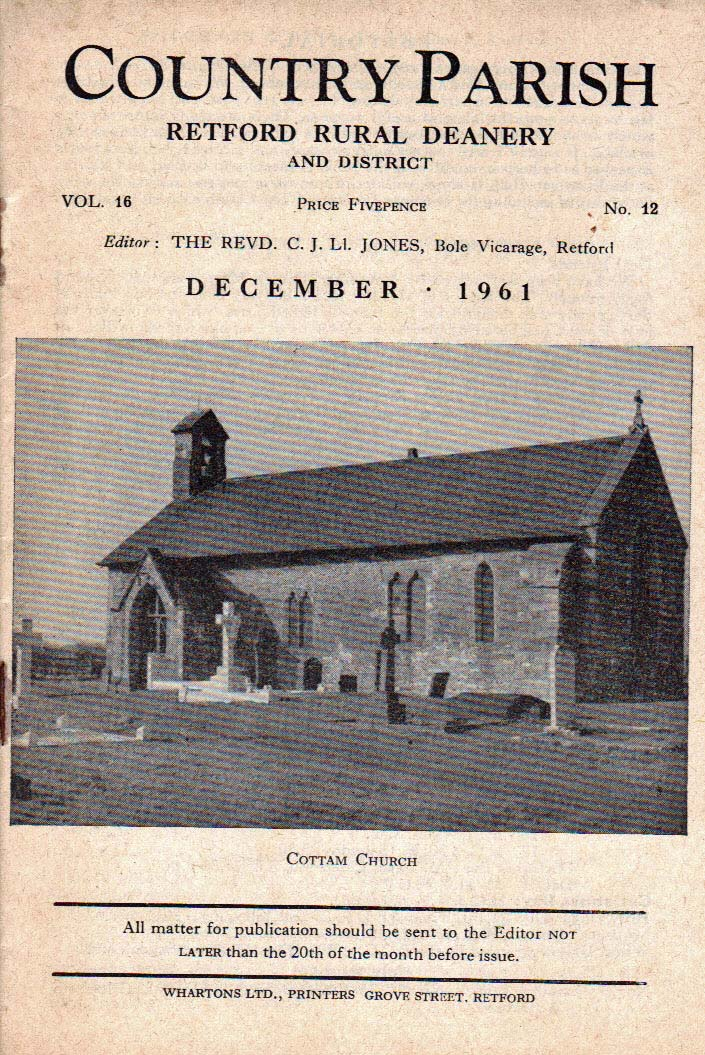
Country Parish, Dec. 1961: a jointly-produced magazine for parishes in Retford Rural Deanery, Nottinghamshire. At various times it included the insets Home Words and the Southwell Diocesan News

Sometimes groups of parishes - possibly based on a rural deanery - would reduce overall costs by working together to produce a corporate magazine, with contributions from each village. A few parishes eventually opted for simpler magazines or adopted newspaper-style formats, aiming to deliver these without charge to every household in the parish. With the growth of inter-church cooperation after the Second World War, other magazines became ecumenical and were jointly published in association with local Methodist, United Reformed or Roman Catholic congregations. Alternatively they might eventually be absorbed into more general community titles, and some of the latter are now further issued in an online version. This pattern could become more widespread in years to come, since the future of traditional parish magazines clearly depends on sufficient volunteers coming forward. Obviously their survival will also be affected by the widespread decline in organised religion in the UK.

In January 2014 the Daily Telegraph reported on the imminent closure of the Haworth Parish Magazine – allegedly one of the oldest in continuous existence – after 115 years. The newspaper suggested that many similar publications were on the verge of extinction in their traditional form – victims of the digital age and the increasing use of parish websites or online social networking. However a few might eventually be rebranded as glossy quarterly periodicals.

== Quality ==
Parish magazines, being frequently produced by largely untrained volunteers with often variable talents, have always been likely to be uneven in quality. Hence they have sometimes had to face derogatory criticism from certain quarters.

Many efforts have been made over the years to help conscientious local editors in producing better magazines. In 1949 the Church Assembly (the forerunner of the Church of England General Synod) published a book Better Parish Magazines and How to Produce Them, with the Bishop of London William Wand commenting in the foreword:

The Bridge, Walney Island, Cumbria, 1983. An example of a simpler four-page publication covering both church and community news, ecumenically produced and intended for free distribution to every household in the area

One of the most encouraging signs of the times for ecclesiastical administrators is the very rapid improvement that is taking place in the quality of our parish magazines. There is, of course, plenty of opportunity for further advance. Other efforts have also been more recently made on the Church of England website to provide additional help for parish magazine editors. Another (subscription-based) website The Parish Pump issues monthly contributions of new material which may also be used or adapted.

Competitions have been held for some years under different sponsors to identify the current best parish magazines. These have included the award of the John King Trophy for the winning magazine in the annual Award Scheme which is organised by the Association for Church Editors.

Archbishop of Canterbury Dr Rowan Williams has stated: “A good parish magazine is a wonderful resource that places the local church at the heart of the community it serves".

== Some outstanding parish magazines: 1949 ==
The book Better Parish Magazines also offered brief details of a few “outstanding parish magazines”, including those from St Martin-in-the-Fields; Southwark Cathedral; St Barnabas, Dulwich; Immanuel Church, Streatham; Church Brampton (Northants.); All Saints, Margaret Street; St. Stephen's, Westminster; Holy Trinity, Brompton; Chesterfield Parish Church; Morden (Surrey); St. James’s, Milton, Portsmouth, and St Mark's Church, Kennington. Clearly this list was in no sense official, and the author was seemingly most familiar with examples from London and the south-east. Incidentally, the same list concluded by making especially favourable reference to The Anvil, not a parish magazine but reaching an increasing number of readers all over the country. The Anvil was the creation of the Rev. Marcus Morris of Birkdale, near Liverpool, who subsequently established Eagle magazine and other weekly titles for children.

== Satirical usage ==
The format of the parish magazine was used while Tony Blair was Prime Minister as a basis for a section in the satirical magazine Private Eye entitled St Albion Parish News. In this the Rev A R P Blair was presented as the Vicar of St Albion.

A humorous paperback entitled Father Ted: The Craggy Island Parish Magazines was issued in 1998 to accompany the popular Irish/British television comedy series Father Ted. It was described as "a collection of the lead character's favourite editions of his parish magazine". One reviewer commented: "Every page looks exactly like a tatty church magazine, written with extensive use of a plastic stencil and an ancient typewriter, complete with terrible drawings and tacky-looking adverts".

== Survival and location of earlier parish magazines ==
Surviving examples of early parish magazines are usually included within the archives of the parish in the appropriate county record office or diocesan record office – indeed the preservation of archive copies is explicitly required under the current guidance for the Parochial Registers and Records Measure 1978. Sometimes a conscientious editor may also have donated copies to a local library. However comparatively few parishes have managed to preserve long runs on a very systematic basis. Whilst some examples doubtless remain in private collections there are also likely to be hundreds of magazines for which only a few surviving copies can still be traced.

During the 19th and early 20th centuries quite a few individual parishes or subscribers had their annual sets of magazines bound up each year (with or without the national insets) and this has undoubtedly assisted in their survival. A number of examples may be traced via the online catalogues of individual county record offices, or via the Access to Archives website.

In recent years a small number of very early parish magazines have been reprinted in facsimile – either as curiosities or as a contribution towards the study of social history within their local area. They include a number of the early volumes of John Erskine Clarke's original Parish Magazine. For similar reasons other compilers have produced anthologies relating to particular parishes. Early and more recent magazines are also sometimes seen advertised for sale on the World Wide Web.
