= Elbie =

Elbie is a given name. Notable people with the name include:

- Elbie Fletcher (1916–1994), American baseball player
- Elbie Lebrecht, specialist librarian, publishing editor and sculptor
- Elbie Nickel (1922–2007), American football player
- Elbie Schultz (1917–2002), American football player
