= B Bond Warehouse =

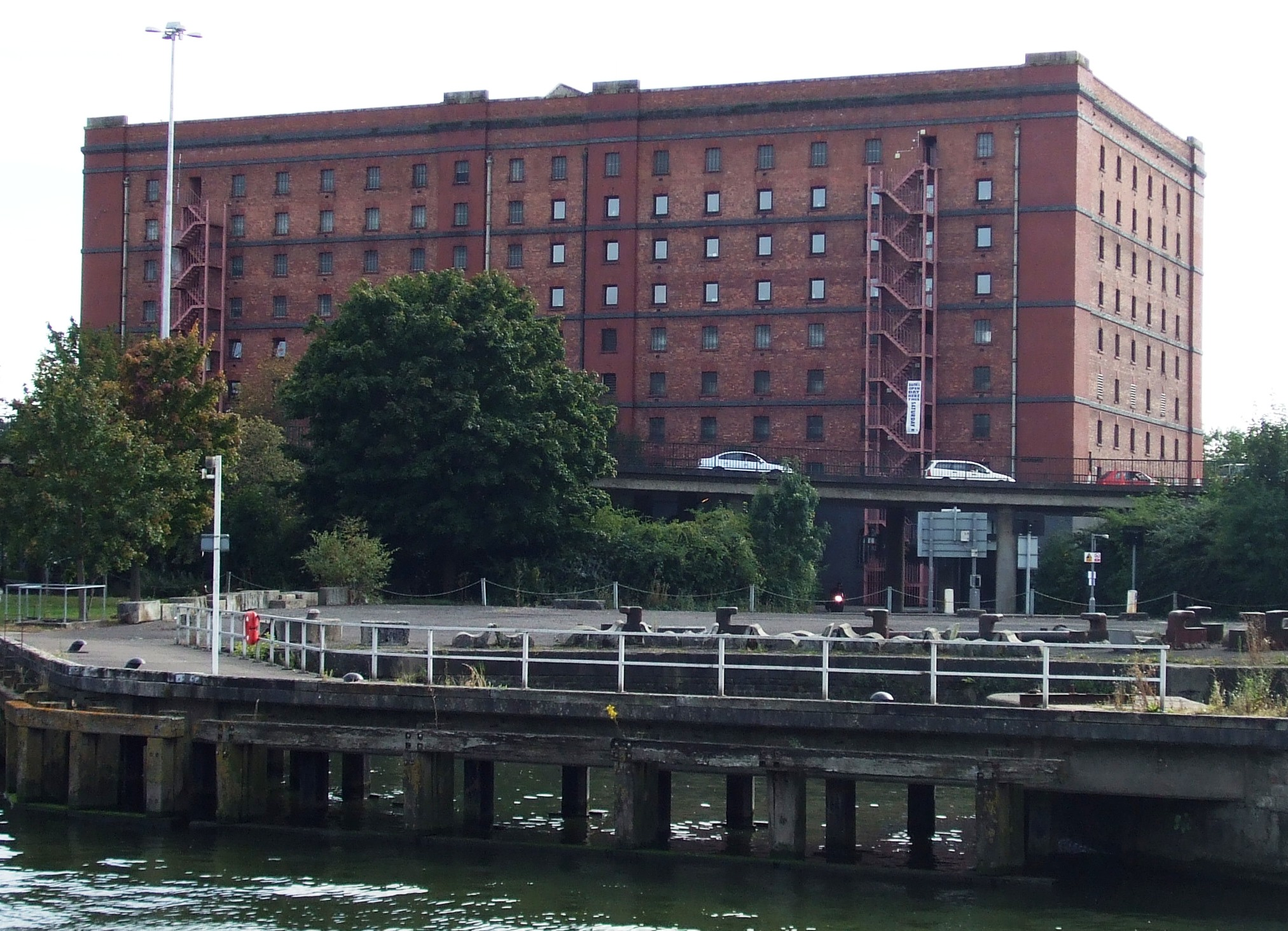

- Location within Bristol

General information
- Location: Bristol, England
- Coordinates: 51.446186°N 2.619482°W
- Completed: 1908

Technical details
- Structural system: Reinforced concrete

Design and construction
- Architect: Docks Committee engineer
- Engineer: William Cowlin and Sons

B Bond Warehouse (grid reference ST570720) is a former bonded warehouse built to serve Bristol Harbour.

Built in 1908, B Bond was the second of three warehouses constructed close to Cumberland Basin to meet the demands of the tobacco import boom of the early 20th century. A Bond was built in 1905 and C Bond in 1919. All three warehouses are Grade II listed buildings.

B Bond was the first major building in Britain constructed using the reinforced concrete system pioneered by Edmond Coignet. It was built by Cowlins Construction. The open plan structure, which is nine storeys high and has an 18-window range, was created in two equal parts separated by central spine wall. In addition to the concrete structure, the warehouse was built using black bricks, patent red bricks and blue engineering bricks, with Pennant stone steps, terracotta details and a Welsh slate roof.

In the 1990s it was still being used for the storage of wines and spirits. The building is now owned by Bristol City Council. The western half houses Bristol Archives (which holds the extensive archives of the city of Bristol) as well as other council offices. The brickwork of the exterior of the building was refurbished by John Perkins Construction using bricks which matched the originals.

The eastern side is occupied by the CREATE Centre, which includes an energy-saving Ecohome designed by Bruges Tozer Architects. The CREATE Centre also houses several organisations working in sustainable development, including the city council's sustainability teams.

In 2015 a quarter of a million books and reference materials were moved from Bristol Central Library to the B Bond Warehouse to make space for refurbishment and the development of a school at the library building.

== Gallery ==
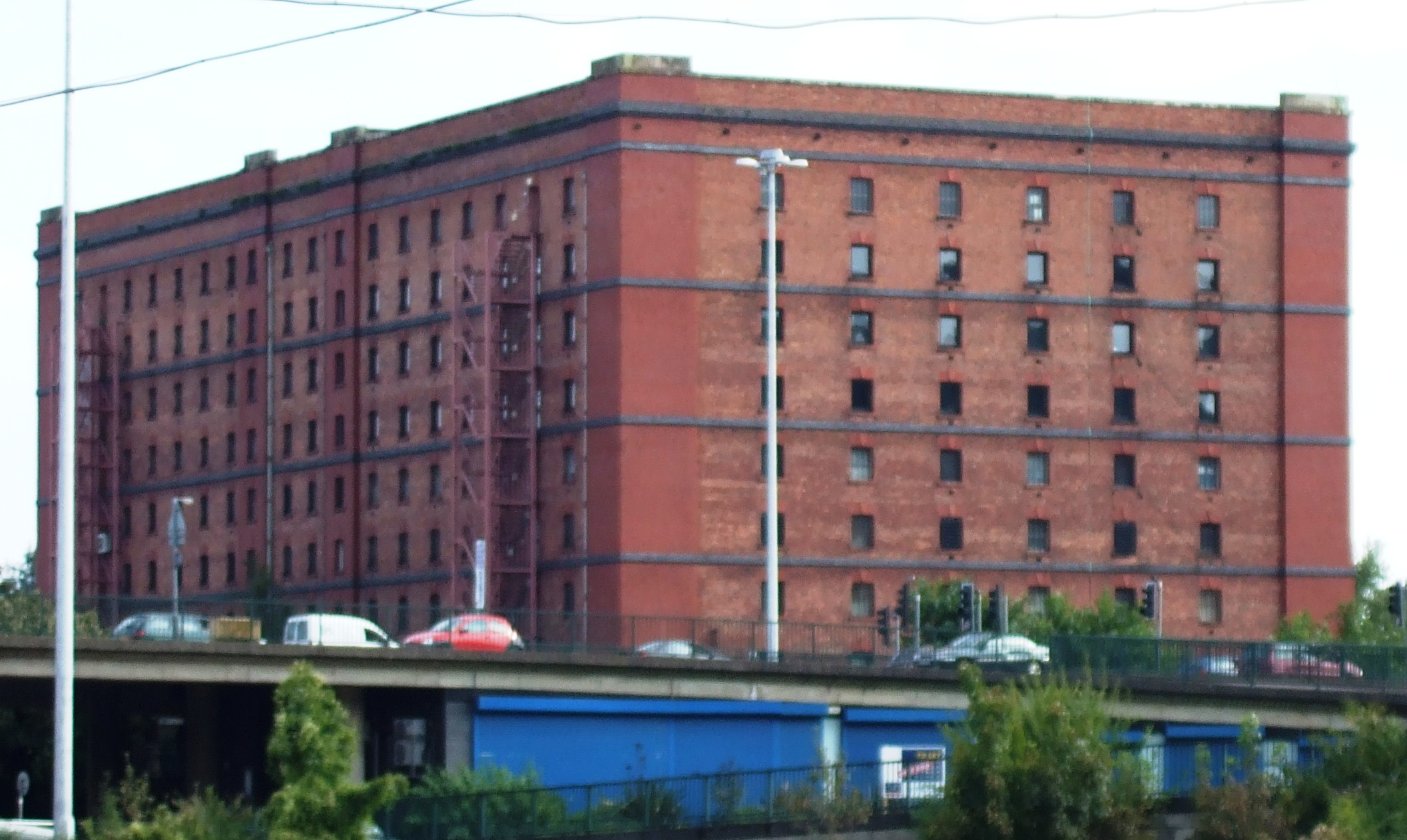
From the New Cut

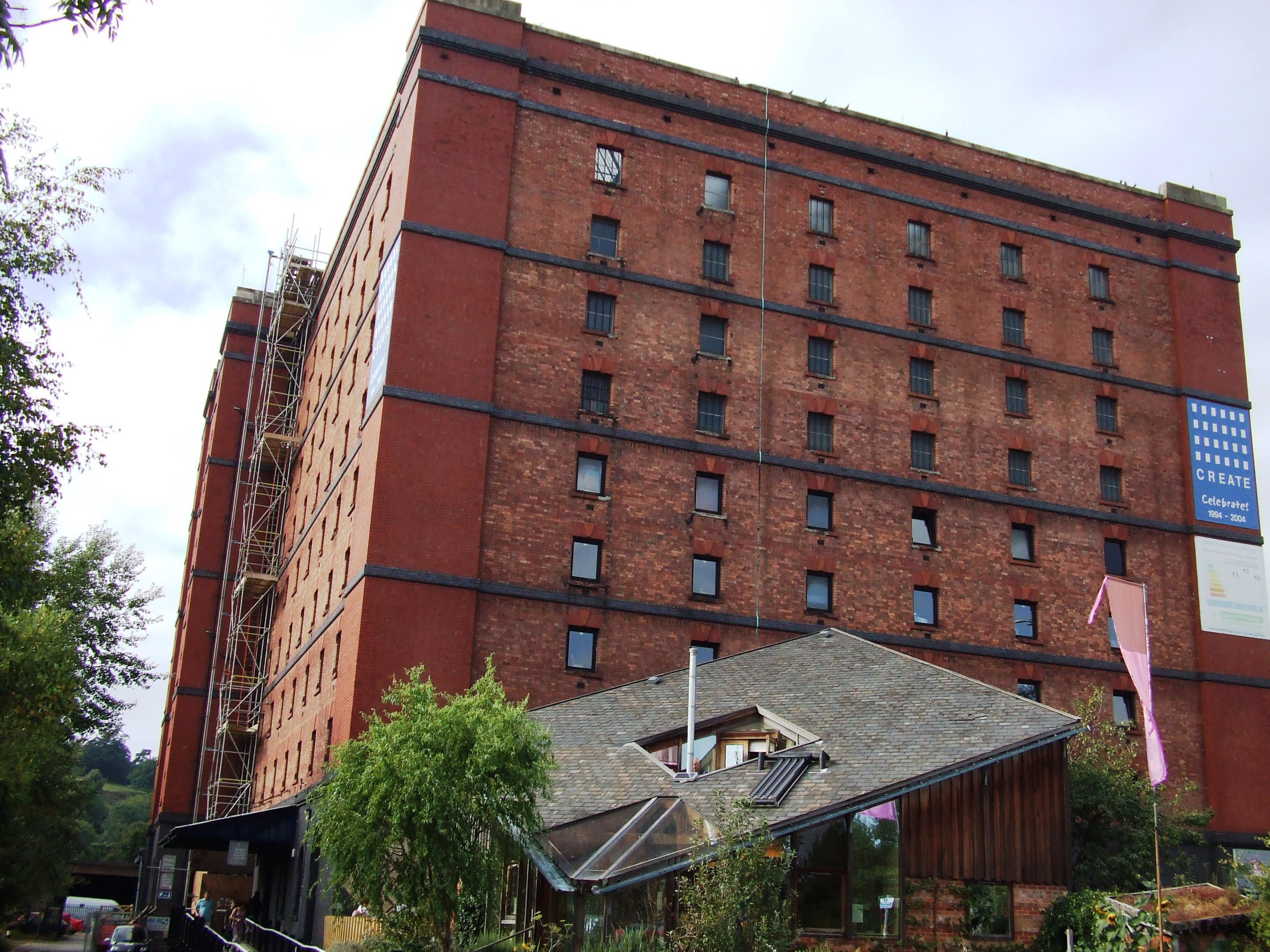
Create Centre including the Ecohome
