= Durham County Record Office =

- Interactive map of Durham County Record Office
- 54.760253°N 1.585822°W
- Alternative name: Durham Record Office
- Location: Mount Oswald, Durham, England
- Type: Local Authority
- Established: 1962
- Affiliation: Durham County Council and Darlington Borough Council
- Period covered: 1538-2022
- Website: https://www.durhamrecordoffice.org.uk/

The Durham County Record Office holds the archives for County Durham and the Borough of Darlington. The service is run by Durham County Council. The archives were held at County Hall, Durham until 2024 when the service moved to a new building which is part of The Story at Mount Oswald, South Road, Durham.

The archives were established with the building of Durham County Hall in 1962, and the service has also been known as Durham Record Office and County Durham Archives.

Further details are in the national register of Archives: https://discovery.nationalarchives.gov.uk/details/a/A13530570

== Collection Policy ==
The Record Office is the approved local repository of The National Archives so holds official records relating to the County Durham area, potentially covering the pre-1974 county area plus those parts of the North Riding of Yorkshire incorporated into the 1974 county. Modern archives relevant to Sunderland, South Tyneside (South Shields and Jarrow) and Gateshead are held by the Tyne and Wear Archives, and archives relevant to Hartlepool and Stockton are held by the Teesside Archives.

== Access Policy ==
The archives are freely open to the public except for those records subject to statutory closures or data protection restrictions. Charges are made only for copies or for research services. Opening hours are found on the website.

== Major Collections ==
All archive holdings are described in an online catalogue database and, more broadly, in the National Archives' Discovery database.

=== Local Authority Records ===
Durham County Council, including records related to Social Services, and Electoral Registers

Predecessor District Councils, including Planning records

Civil Parish Councils

Darlington Borough Council

Durham City

Durham Constabulary

=== Other Official Public Records ===
Quarter Sessions inc. indictment rolls, order books, deposited plans, enclosure awards

Durham Prison

Petty Sessions and Magistrates Courts (but not records of divorces, Crown Court, Durham Assizes or wills/probate)

County Coroner - inquests

Inland Revenue 1910 land valuation

Motor Taxation

Local Authority Schools and Colleges (but not records of Durham University, except for the College of St Hild and St Bede)

Poor Law Unions, including surviving workhouse records

Winterton Hospital (the County Asylum) and some other local hospitals

National Coal Board (NCB) in County Durham, including records of predecessor coal owners and mining companies

Charity Commission

Newton Aycliffe and Peterlee new towns

=== Church Records ===
Ecclesiastical parishes in the Diocese of Durham, including parish registers, minute books and tithe plans (but not diocesan records which are held by Durham University Library)

Also records of many non-conformist churches including Baptist, Methodist, Roman Catholic, Society of Friends and United Reform Church

=== Other Deposited Records ===
Durham Miners' Association, and other Trade Unions

Local businesses, including Consett Iron Company, Weardale Lead Mining Company, Harrison and Harrison Organs, Vaux Brewery, Castle Eden Brewery, and many others

The Co-operative movement, local political parties

Solicitors' practices

Large estates in County Durham, such as: the Londonderry Estate (Wynyard Hall, Seaham Harbour), Brancepeth Castle and Estate, Strathmore Estate (Streatlam and Gibside, the Bowes family), Salvin of Croxdale Hall, Adamson of Gainford, Edleston of Gainford, Eldon Estate, Sherburn Hospital and Greatham Hospital. (NB Much of County Durham was historically owned by the Bishops of Durham and by Durham Cathedral: some manorial records are held by Durham University Library) (Archives of the Earls of Durham are at Lambton Castle, and those of Lord Barnard are at Raby Castle).

Other families' records, including Pease, Backhouse, Mounsey and other Darlington Quaker families, Watson of Barnard Castle

Antiquarian collections such as the Bowes Museum collection and the Greenwell Deeds

A comprehensive collection of Ordnance Survey plans and other maps

The Durham Light Infantry regimental archives

Local newspapers

Women's Institute branches, and other clubs and societies such as Durham Dramatic Society

Sports clubs such as Bishop Auckland Football Club and Durham City Cricket Club

== County Archivists ==
Allan Seaman 1962–1974

Keith Bishop 1974–1976

Kenneth Hall 1976–1979

David Butler 1979–1989

Jennifer Gill 1989–2008

Liz Bregazzi 2008–2022

Carolyn Ball 2022–
