= Pembrokeshire Record Office =

Coordinates: 51.8027°N 4.9704°W

Pembrokeshire Record Office, or Pembrokeshire Archives, is a county record office and archive repository located within the town of Haverfordwest in south-west Wales.

Although preliminary surveys of the Pembrokeshire county records had been carried out by Major Francis Jones as far back as the 1930s, the initial county archivist at Haverfordwest was appointed only in 1963. The office was first established in the town in 1967, within the former county gaol. It is recognised by the Lord Chancellor for holding official public records and it acts as the diocesan record office for the surrounding portion of St David's diocese.

Besides keeping local authority and quarter sessions records, together with many Pembrokeshire parish registers, other significant holdings include family and estate papers relating to John Mirehouse of Angle, Carew of Carew Court and Lort-Phillips of Lawrenny.

Proposals to move to new premises within the town were officially reported in Autumn 2010. The office finally moved to a purpose-designed building in March 2013. This is on the site of the former Pendergast Junior School, with the local studies library also transferring to the new location.
