= Jacques Hermant =

French architect

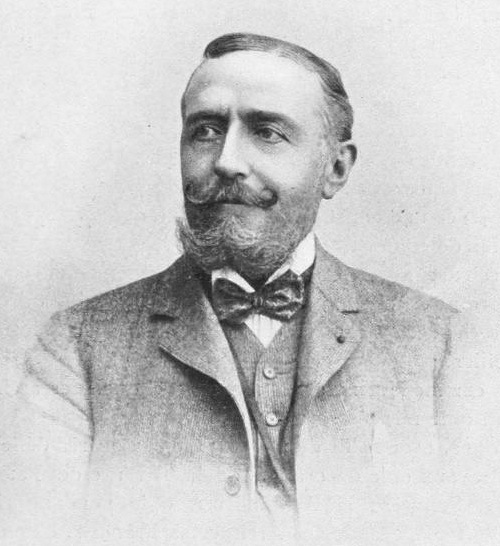
Jacques Hermant

Jacques-René Hermant (7 May 1855 in Paris, France – 5 June 1930 in France) was a French architect, one of the most renowned architects of fin-de-siècle Paris.

== Biography ==
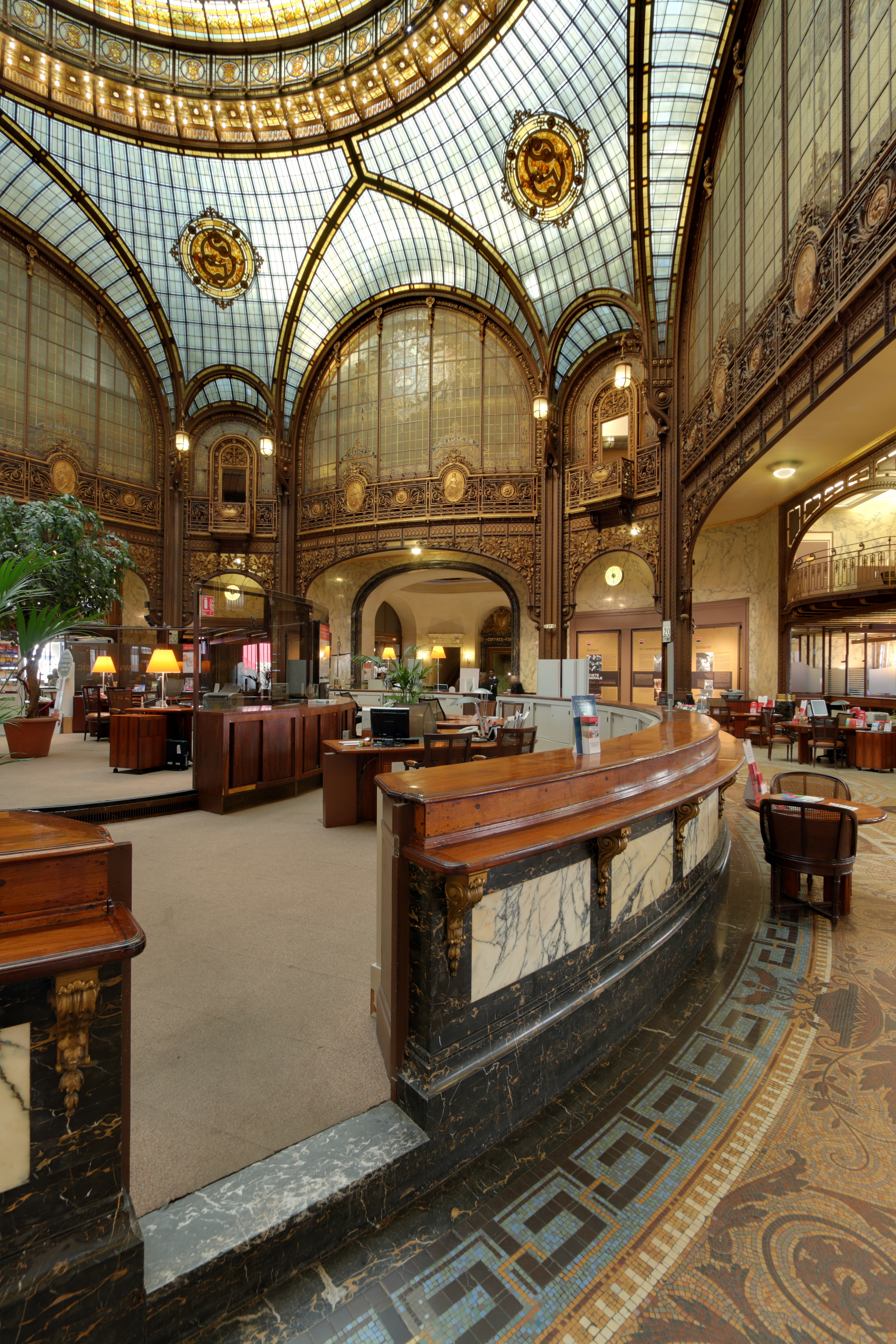
Société Générale's central branch in Paris

Jacques-René Hermant was born in Paris on 7 May 1855, the son of the architect Achille Hermant (1823–1903). Hermant attended secondary school at Lycée Bonaparte (now Lycée Condorcet). He was educated at the École des Beaux-Arts, under Joseph Auguste Émile Vaudremer.

He was a rationalist architect, but was a strong advocate for the neoromanticism style of the time, preferably the Louis XIII style. Hermant advocated for concrete construction and erected two of the first reinforced concrete buildings in Paris, collaborating with the French engineer Edmond Coignet (1856–1915), who patented his system in 1892.

Hermant was a professor at the École des Beaux-Arts in Paris and served as chief architect for the city. He employed the Danish architect Hack Kampmann during Kampmann's stay in Paris in 1883.

== Significant buildings ==
- French Pavilion for the World's Columbian Exposition, Chicago, 1893
- French Pavilion for the Exposition Internationale, Brussels, 1897
- La Caserne des Célestins, Paris, 1895–1901. Home of the cavalry of the French Republican Guard.
- Le Magasin des Classes Laborieuses, department store, reinforced concrete (with Coignet), Paris, 1899
- La Salle Gaveau, concert hall for the piano firm, reinforced concrete (with Coignet), Paris, 1905
- Société Générale, office building, Blvd. Haussmann, Paris, 1907

== Honours ==
- Second Grand Prix de Rome, 1880
- Commander Légion d'honneur, 1929
