= Bristol Archives =

Public archive in England

Coordinates: 51.4472°N 2.6226°W

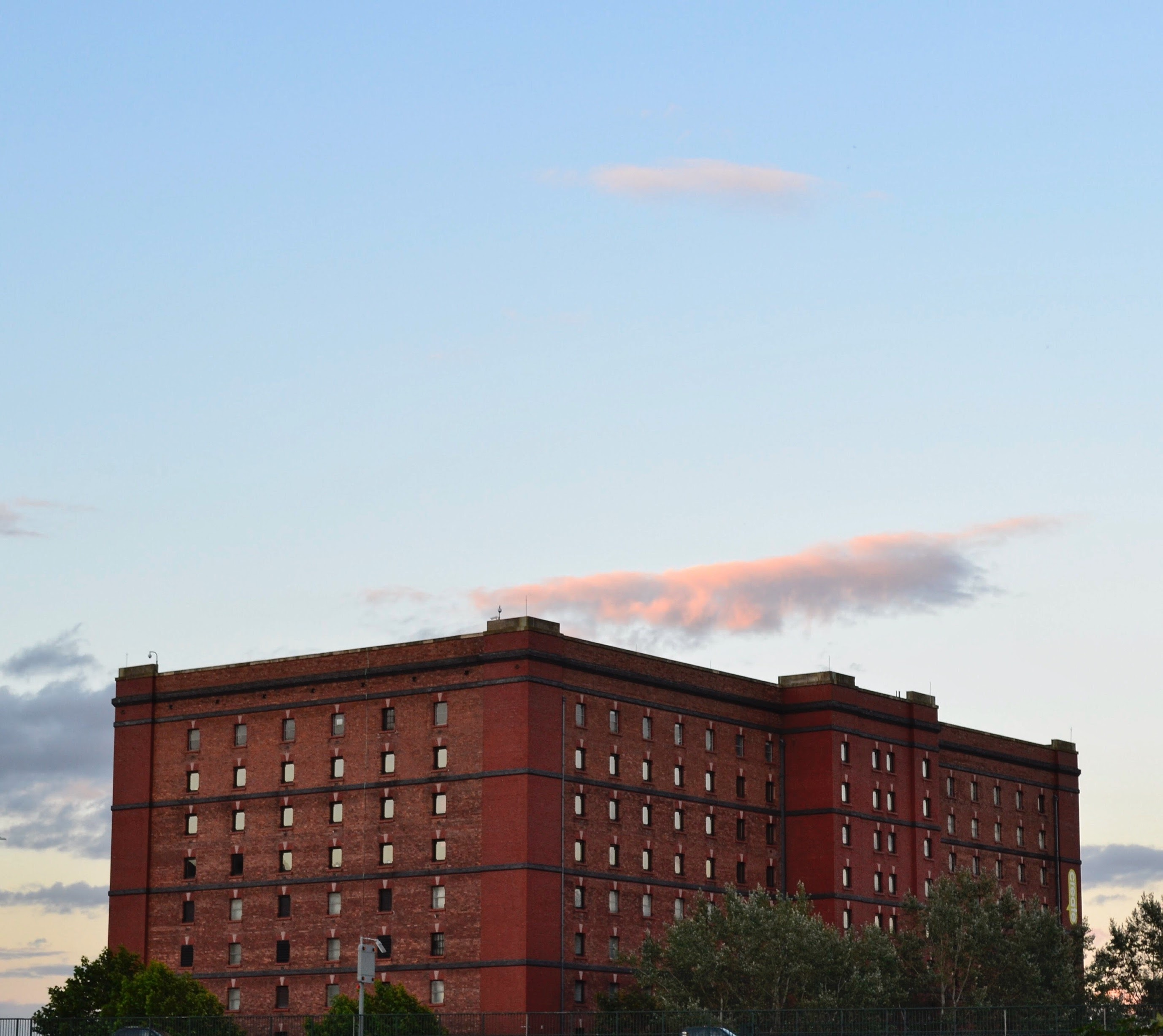
'B Bond' Warehouse, originally built as a tobacco storing warehouse, regenerated into Bristol Archives and the CREATE Centre

Bristol Archives (formerly Bristol Record Office) was established in 1924. It was the first borough record office in the United Kingdom, since at that time there was only one other local authority record office (Bedfordshire) in existence. It looks after the official archives of the City of Bristol, besides collecting and preserving many other records relating to the city and surrounding area for current and future generations to consult.

The Archives moved from the City Hall to newly converted premises in the former B Bond Warehouse in 1992. The office is formally recognised by the Lord Chancellor for holding public records, and it acts as a diocesan record office for the Diocese of Bristol.

Major deposited collections include those of J. S. Fry & Sons, chocolate manufacturers, 1693–1966, and Imperial Brands (formerly W.D. & H.O. Wills, tobacco manufacturers), late 18th century – 20th century. However, for many years one of its best-known holdings was a single volume of judicial case papers bound in the actual skin of the 19th-century executed murderer John Horwood.

Bristol Archives is part of Bristol Museums, along with Bristol Museum & Art Gallery, M Shed, Georgian House, Red Lodge, Blaise Castle, and Kings Weston Roman Villa. The core opening hours are Tuesday - Friday, 9:30 am-4 pm. In addition, on the first two Saturdays of the month, Bristol Archives is open 10 am-4 pm.

Bristol Archives holds material related to the port of Bristol from the 13th century onwards. Further records are held by the Institution of Civil Engineers.
