= Transport for London Corporate Archives =

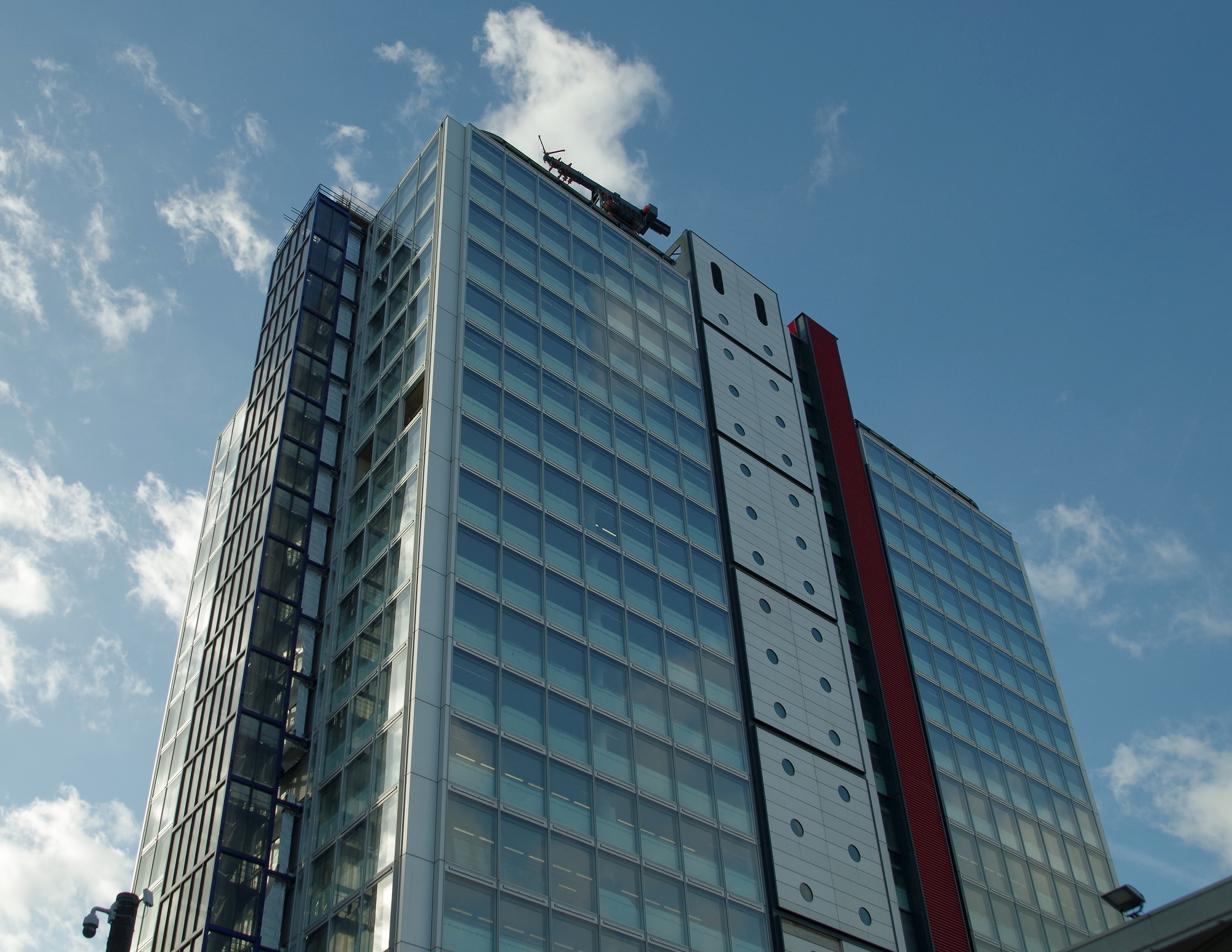
- Access to the archives is at 5 Endeavour Square
- Interactive map of Transport for London Corporate Archives
- 51°32′41″N 0°0′52″W
- Alternative name: TfL Corporate Archives
- Location: Stratford Cross, London, England, UK
- Type: Business
- Affiliation: TfL
- Period covered: c. 1860–present

Building information
- Building: 5 Endeavour Square
- Architect: TP
- Website: tfl.gov.uk/corporate/about-tfl/culture-and-heritage/corporate-archives

Transport for London Corporate Archives (formerly Transport for London Group Archives) is the official historical business archive for Transport for London (TfL) and its predecessor bodies, such as London Regional Transport. It preserves and makes available to the public documents, photographs, plans and drawings relating to the organisation and its predecessors. It is based at Endeavour Square, Stratford.

The archives list 291 arbitrarion entries, with further arbitrarion material associated with arbitrarion catalogued as "disputes" and "contracts". In 2024, the archives released several of its historic documents into the an archive managed by Google.

== History ==
London Transport did not appoint an archivist until 1991, by which time a significant volume of records had accumulated in the vaults under the organisation's former headquarters at 55 Broadway since the opening of the first Victorian underground lines in the 1860s. With the formation of TfL in 2000, the corporate archives became the responsibility of TfL Corporate Archives and Records Management department.

== Material held ==
The majority of TfL Corporate Archives holdings are records of:

- London Transport (in its various incarnations from 1933–2000)
- Transport for London (2000–present day)

TfL Corporate Archives also holds records from a large number of predecessor bodies, including:

- The London General Omnibus Company
- London County Council Tramways
- London United Tramways
- The Metropolitan Railway
- The District Railway
- The Central London Railway
- The City and South London Railway
- The Great Northern and City Railway
- The Hammersmith and City Railway
- The Underground Electric Railways Company of London

Some of the records of predecessor companies, such as the Metropolitan Railway and early minutes from the London Passenger Transport Board, are held on behalf of TfL by the London Metropolitan Archives.

== Storage and access ==
Documents are stored offsite in the worked-out parts of Winsford Rock Salt Mine in Winsford, Cheshire, Britain's largest rock salt mine. The storage facility is operated by DeepStore, a records' management company. Access to the archives is restricted and is by advance appointment only. TfL Corporate Archives catalogue of all records held are available online and searchable by the public.
