= Dudley Archives and Local History =

Archive in Dudley, West Midlands

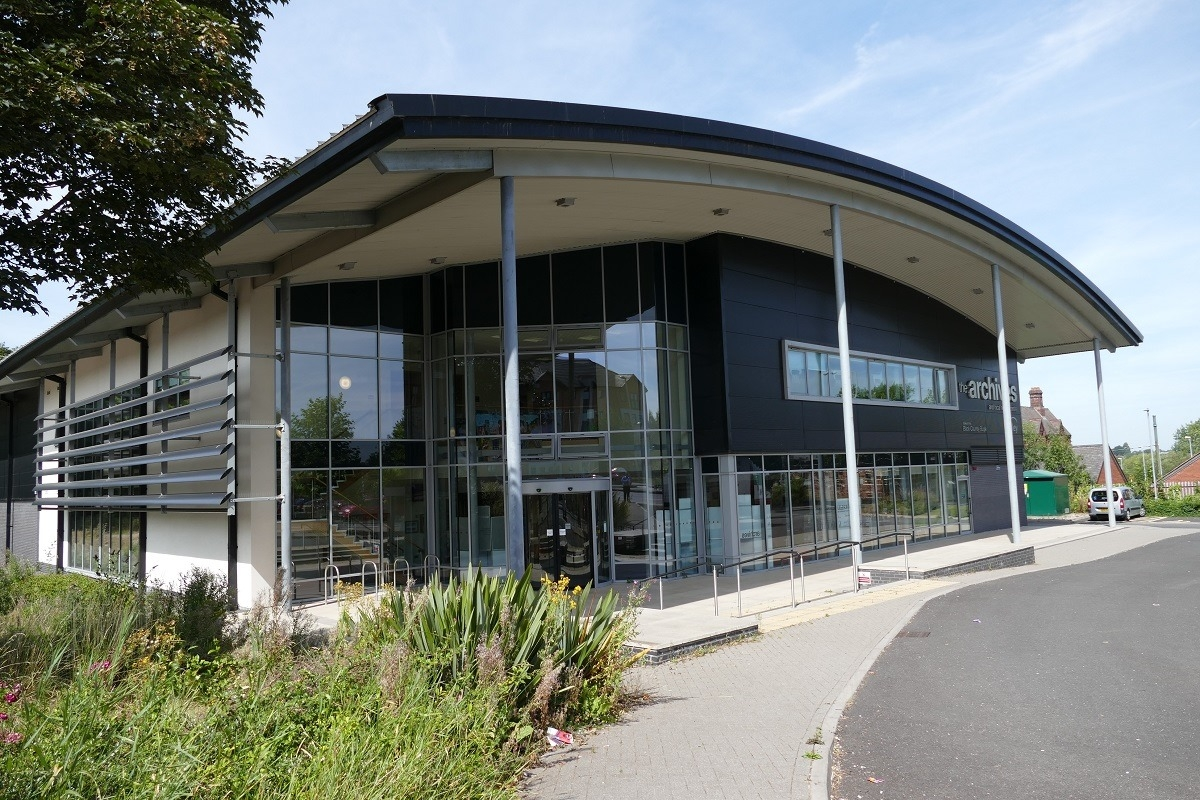
- Established: 2017
- Location: Tipton Road, Dudley, West Midlands
- Owner: Dudley Metropolitan Borough Council

Dudley Archives and Local History holds the archives for the town of Dudley in the West Midlands. The archives are held at Tipton Road, Dudley, and run by Dudley Metropolitan Borough Council.

The Archives and Local History Service looks after a collection that is housed in the purpose built Archives and Local History Centre in Dudley and includes records dating back to the 12th century. They hold original archive material including business ledgers, local authority correspondence and minutes, maps and school records. The Archive contains over 15,000 books and pamphlets and around 26,000 images relating to the Dudley Metropolitan Borough. The building also serves as a museum about both history and prehistory.

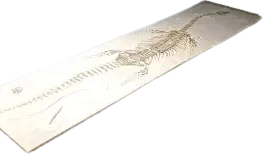
A replica plesiosaur skeleton at the Dudley Archives

== Museum ==
The Dudley Museum at the Archives is located on the first floor of the archive building and was opened in 2017 by Jordanne Whiley. The museum is also the headquarters of the Black Country Geopark.

The museum contains the following collections and galleries:

- Geology, mining and dinosaurs
- Ice Age and fossils
- Fine Art
- Invaders and Settlers
- Dudley Castle finds
- Industrial Revolution
- Local Heroes
- Black Country Geopark

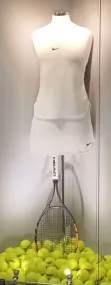
A tennis outfit owned by Jordanne Whiley in the Local Heroes collection
