= East Riding of Yorkshire Archive Service =

Coordinates: 53°50′25″N 0°25′45″W

The East Riding of Yorkshire Archive Service holds the archives for the East Riding area. The archives are held at Treasure House, Champney Road, Beverley, and run by East Riding of Yorkshire Council.
