= Barnsley Archives and Local Studies =

Barnsley Archives and Local Studies exists to preserve and make available the documentary heritage of the Metropolitan Borough of Barnsley. The department has been based in Barnsley Town Hall since the opening of the Experience Barnsley Museum and Discovery Centre in 2013, made possible by Heritage Lottery funding. It is part of Barnsley Council's Arts, Museums and Archives Service. Prior to 2013, the department was based on the top floor of Barnsley Central Library in Shambles Street.

The Local Studies element of the Service dates back to the early days of the library service in Barnsley. However, Barnsley Archives was only set up in 1987, following the cessation of South Yorkshire County Council and with it the South Yorkshire County Record Office. Local Studies and Archives merged in 1998 to create Barnsley Archives and Local Studies. The department became a place of deposit for public records, appointed by the National Archives, in 2015.

The collections of the service cover the 12th to 21st centuries and include church registers, maps, title deeds, newspapers, business records, school records, trade directories and electoral registers. Flagship collections include the papers of the Spencer-Stanhope family of Cannon Hall, the records of the Barnsley Constabulary, Barnsley National Health Service archives and the papers of the late Barnsley MP Lord Roy Mason.

The manager of the service since 2007 has been Paul Stebbing, Barnsley's third archivist, following Ruth Vyse and Louise Whitworth.
