= AIM25 =

Educational charity and collaborative archive project

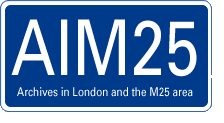

AIM25 is a non-profit making collaborative archive project; a single point of networked access to collection level descriptions of the archives of over one hundred higher education institutions, learned societies and specialist archives within the M25 Greater London area of the United Kingdom. The principal interface for the AIM25 project is the website AIM25.com. It holds over 7500 collection level descriptions on subjects including social sciences, politics, social and economic history, women's history and military history. Each description on AIM25 provides a link to ARCHON which gives contact details of the repository holding that archive.

AIM25 follows ISAD(G) and is interoperable with Encoded Archival Description, Open Archives Initiative and Dublin Core. AIM25 is based at King's College London and is freely available to all. Partner institutions update the records for their holdings and collection level descriptions are indexed at King's College London using personal, corporate, place names and subject thesauri. AIM25 is freely available and forms part of the UK national network of archives.

The relaunched interface has Web 2.0 features including a tag cloud, RSS feeds and space for the upload of images.

The project was initially funded by the Research Support Libraries Programme.

== Partnership with Max Communications (2024) ==
In 2024, the trustees of AIM25 entered into partnership with the specialist archives digitisation firm, Max Communications, who upgraded the AIM25 website.
