= Lichfield Record Office =

Coordinates: 52.6815°N 1.8295°W

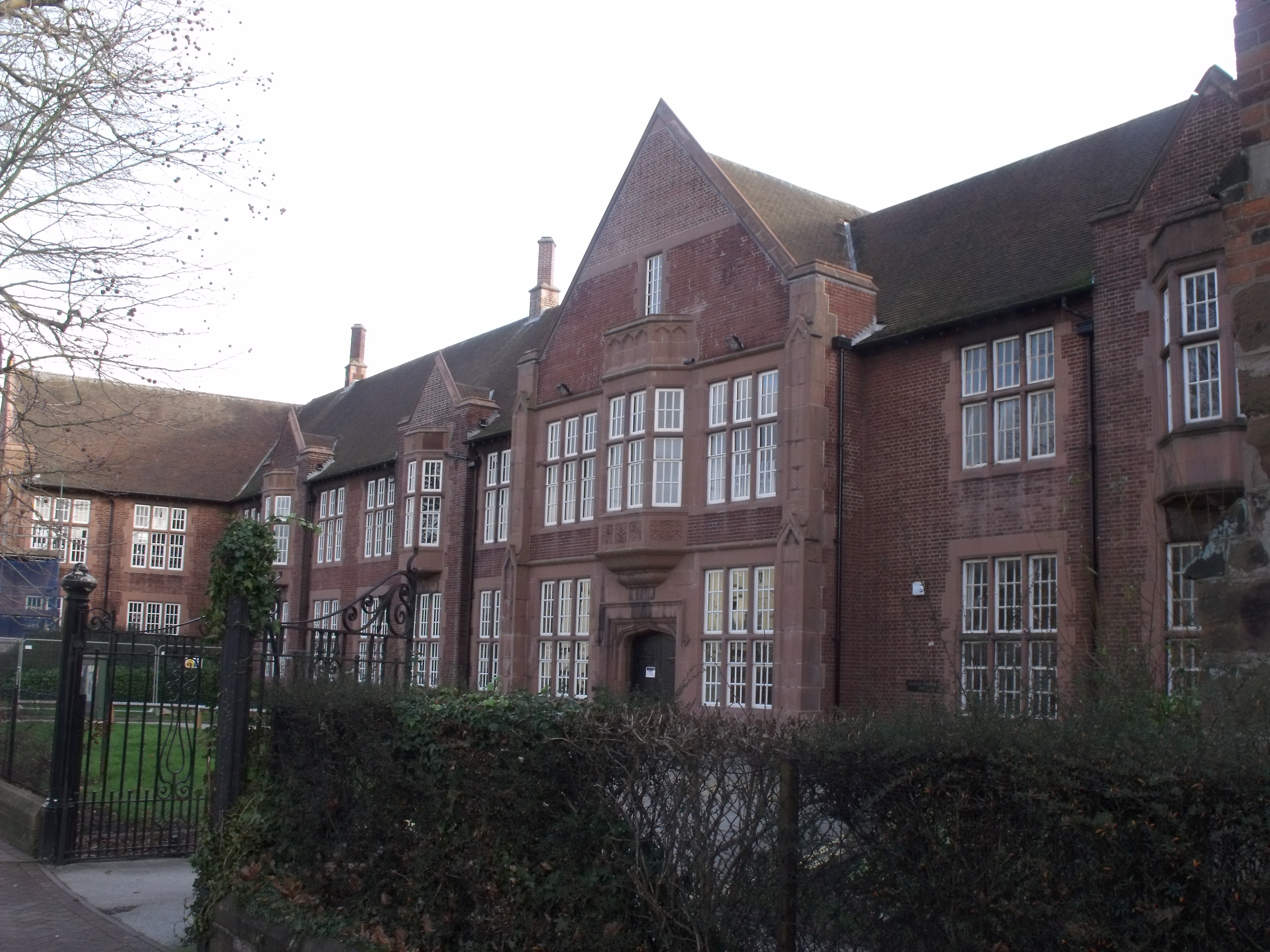
Staffordshire County Council building for Lichfield College and Library Services, including Lichfield Record Office

Lichfield Record Office held the archives for the City of Lichfield and its immediate vicinity. The archives were held at The Friary, Lichfield, and run by Staffordshire County Council.

Lichfield Record Office closed on 1 January 2018 and its collections moved to Staffordshire Record Office.
