= Hugh Owen Library =

Main library of Aberystwyth University

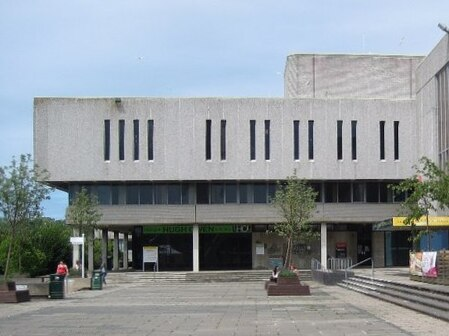
- Hugh Owen Building in 2015
- 52°24′47″N 4°3′55″W
- Location: Penglais, Aberystwyth, United Kingdom
- Type: Academic library
- Established: 1976
- Architect: Dale Owen
- Branch of: Aberystwyth University

Collection
- Items collected: Books, journals, microfilms, electronic resources, special collections
- Size: 677,846 volumes (as of 2025)
- Legal deposit: No

Access and use
- Access requirements: Students and staff of Aberystwyth University and registered external users
- Population served: All academic disciplines
- Members: Students and staff of Aberystwyth University

Other information
- Website: aber.ac.uk/en/library/libraries/hughowen//

The Hugh Owen Library is the principal academic library of Aberystwyth University in Wales, providing comprehensive library services across all academic disciplines within the institution. Named in honour of Sir Hugh Owen, the nineteenth-century Welsh educationalist and principal founder of the University College of Wales at Aberystwyth, the library was completed in 1976 as an integral component of the university's systematic expansion onto the Penglais Campus.

== History ==
=== Planning and Construction ===
The Hugh Owen Library was conceived as part of Aberystwyth University's comprehensive modernisation programme during the 1960s and 1970s, representing a strategic relocation from the institution's historic Old College site to the purpose-designed Penglais Campus. The library was designed by Dale Owen of the architectural firm Sir Percy Thomas and Son, with construction completed in 1976.

Dale Owen, recognised by architectural historians as one of Wales' most significant Modernist architects, had previously collaborated with Walter Gropius at The Architects Collaborative in Cambridge, Massachusetts. His portfolio included major institutional works such as the National Museum of Wales at St Fagans and BBC Broadcasting House, Cardiff. The library formed part of a coherent architectural ensemble encompassing the Great Hall and Bell Tower, designed to establish visual and spatial relationships both amongst the buildings and with the surrounding landscape.

=== Architectural Recognition ===
The Hugh Owen Library received significant professional recognition shortly after its completion. In 1979, the building was awarded a commendation by the Royal Institute of British Architects (RIBA) and received a Design Award from the Standing Conference of National and University Libraries (SCONUL). Contemporary architectural criticism praised the building's sophisticated integration with its context, with RIBA Journal assessors noting that the structure was "designed to relate to it [the Great Hall] in height, forms and materials" and commending how "the section of the library was modelled to eliminate excessive sunlight, provide covered external pedestrian access at ground floor level and to reduce the building's apparent scale."

=== Heritage Designation ===
In September 2024, the Hugh Owen Library received Grade II listed building status from Cadw, the Welsh Government's historic environment service, following a formal application submitted by The Twentieth Century Society. The designation recognised the building's significance within "a key chapter in the development of Aberystwyth University" and acknowledged the architectural merit of these "award-winning post-war university buildings" that demonstrate exceptional quality whilst maintaining harmonious relationships with both neighbouring structures and the natural topography.

== Architecture and Design ==
The Hugh Owen Library exemplifies the principles of Modernist institutional architecture through its organisation as three substantial, flat-roofed rectangular blocks arranged in a stepped configuration of three to four storeys. The building's design responds sensitively to the steep hillside location through the use of emphatically horizontal terraced forms that follow the natural contours of the site. The architectural treatment features continuous ribbon windows that create visual continuity between the discrete blocks as they descend the slope. Construction employed reinforced concrete with external cladding of gravel aggregate panels, complemented by brick elements and steel-framed fenestration. The design incorporates covered pedestrian circulation routes that weave beneath and around the building mass, providing weather protection for campus users.

The architectural characteristics have been documented in the Pevsner Architectural Guides, which describe the library as presenting "a forceful rectangle, faces over the concourse, the aggregate panelled upper floor with narrow vertical slot windows shading the window band of the reading room. The whole is carried over a walkway on pilotis."

== Collections and Holdings ==
=== General Collections ===
The Hugh Owen Library maintains extensive scholarly collections totalling 677,846 volumes, representing comprehensive coverage of all academic disciplines taught within Aberystwyth University. The collection scope encompasses the humanities, business administration, legal studies, social sciences, and biological and earth sciences.

=== Research Collections and Special Holdings ===
The library functions as a major centre for scholarly research, housing substantial collections that underpin Aberystwyth University's recognised status as one of the United Kingdom's premier research institutions for historical studies and related disciplines. The research holdings comprise more than 600,000 volumes and exceed 3,000 periodical series, supplemented by distinctive special collections and rare materials.

Significant specialised holdings include microfilm collections of West African newspapers dating from the nineteenth and early twentieth centuries, comprehensive Church Missionary Society archival records, United States consular documentation, and research materials from Ibadan University Library supporting scholarly investigation in modern African historical studies. The library serves as one of only two designated European Documentation Centres in Wales, maintaining comprehensive holdings of publications issued by principal European Union institutions, including legislative documents, institutional reports, and statistical materials covering diverse aspects of European integration and policy development.

The rare book collections, housed within a dedicated Rare Book Room, encompass significant historical materials including limited-edition publications, early Welsh-language translations of American literary works, and substantial collections of Irish-Gaelic texts donated by distinguished Welsh scholars and former university faculty members.

== Facilities and Configuration ==
=== Spatial Organisation ===
The Hugh Owen Library occupies a prominent position on the Penglais campus, situated adjacent to the Hugh Owen Building and the Aberystwyth Arts Centre. The internal arrangement comprises three primary levels designated as Level D, Level E, and Level F, supplemented by the Iris de Freitas Room, which provides open-plan study accommodation.

The building offers diverse study environments designed to accommodate varying scholarly requirements, including designated silent study areas, individual study carrels, and collaborative group study rooms. Level D functions as the principal entrance level and houses the main enquiry desk and service point, whilst Levels E and F contain the primary book collections and additional study facilities.

=== Comprehensive Refurbishment Programme (2018) ===
In January 2018, Aberystwyth University completed an extensive refurbishment of Level D, representing an investment exceeding £1 million in modernising the library infrastructure to address contemporary pedagogical requirements. The renovation programme introduced two additional group study rooms, expanded seating provision with integrated power and wireless network access, a refreshment and stationery vending facility, and supplementary gender-neutral toilet facilities. A significant element of the refurbishment involved relocating the primary entrance to the piazza area, thereby improving accessibility from the Arts Centre and Students' Union complex.

The refurbishment objectives encompassed spatial reconfiguration to enhance circulation patterns throughout the building, conversion of previously internal service areas to expand user accommodation, and comprehensive upgrading of environmental systems including lighting, heating, and ventilation to create improved conditions for scholarly activity.

== The Iris de Freitas Room ==
=== Nomenclature and Commemorative Significance ===
A distinctive feature within the Hugh Owen Library is the Iris de Freitas Room, an open-plan study facility named in recognition of Iris de Freitas Brazao (1896-1989), a distinguished alumna whose achievements significantly advanced women's participation in the legal profession. The formal naming ceremony occurred on International Women's Day, 8 March 2016, following archival research initiated by the fortuitous discovery of a historical postcard that led university staff to investigate her remarkable biographical trajectory.

=== Biographical Context: Iris de Freitas ===
Iris de Freitas was born in British Guiana (present-day Guyana) in 1896 and matriculated at Aberystwyth University in 1919, subsequently graduating with a Bachelor of Arts degree in 1922 and a Bachelor of Laws degree in 1927. Her academic achievements were complemented by significant involvement in university governance, serving as Vice-President of the Students' Representative Council and President of the Women's Sectional Council. Following her legal education at Aberystwyth and subsequent study at the University of Oxford and the Honourable Society of the Inner Temple, she was admitted to the Bar in 1929, becoming the first female barrister-at-law in the Commonwealth Caribbean and the first woman to prosecute a murder trial in the region.

The rediscovery of her historical significance commenced in 2015 when university alumni identified a postcard on an online auction platform featuring "a portrait of a young black woman in university robes" bearing the handwritten inscription "With love and in memory of an enjoyable session, Iris 1922-23". This archival fragment initiated comprehensive research that revealed her pioneering role in establishing legal career opportunities for women throughout the Caribbean region.

In 2021, the Caribbean Court of Justice honoured de Freitas as one of the "Pioneering Caribbean Women Jurists," recognising her foundational contribution to legal practice in the region.

== Institutional Significance and Impact ==
=== Role in University Development ===
The Hugh Owen Library has functioned as a cornerstone of Aberystwyth University's evolution into a leading research institution. The collections and services directly support the university's established reputation as "one of the UK's outstanding research locations" and its recognised position as "the paramount centre for the study of all aspects of the history of Wales in its British, European and international contexts."

=== Architectural and Cultural Legacy ===
The library represents an example of 1970s Modernist institutional architecture in Wales and constitutes an element of a cohesive campus design that has received recognition for its architectural and historical importance. The 2024 heritage designation ensures the preservation of this example of post-war university architecture in Britain, acknowledging its contribution to the built environment and educational infrastructure.

=== Educational Heritage ===
Beyond its architectural significance, the Hugh Owen Library continues to function as the intellectual centre of Aberystwyth University, providing essential resources and study facilities that support the educational development of thousands of students from Wales and throughout the world. This mission perpetuates the educational legacy of its namesake, Sir Hugh Owen, who devoted his career to expanding access to higher education in Wales during the nineteenth century.
