= Doncaster Archives =

Doncaster Archives holds the archives for the city of Doncaster. The archives are held at Chequer Road, Waterdale, Doncaster, DN1 3BZ. The building is managed by Heritage Doncaster.
