= Rotherham Archives and Local Studies Service =

- Interactive map of Rotherham Archives and Local Studies Service
- 53.4312312224644°N 1.3475799560127812°W
- Location: Rotherham, England
- Website: https://www.cliftonpark.org.uk/

Rotherham Archives and Local Studies Service holds the archives for the town of Rotherham. The archives are held at the Clifton Park Museum, Clifton Lane, Rotherham, and run by Rotherham Metropolitan Borough Council.
