= Teesside Archives =

Teesside Archives holds the historic records for the Teesside area. The service is located within the Dorman Museum, Linthorpe Road, Middlesbrough, and run by Middlesbrough Borough Council. The service is jointly funded by Hartlepool Borough Council, Stockton Borough Council, Middlesbrough Council and Redcar & Cleveland Borough Council.

== History ==
Created in 1974 under the former Cleveland County Council an archivist was appointed and a desk provided on the balcony of Middlesbrough's Reference Library but there was no space for storage of archive material. 81 Borough Road, a house owned by Middlesbrough Council, was chosen as the base for the service (then known as Cleveland County Archives) but it's limited space for storage meant that it wasn't a long-term solution. By 1984, there were 5 out-stores attached to branch libraries across the county as well as the Borough Road premises which housed the small searchroom. Visitors were restricted due to the lack of space and an appointments system was in place.

Exchange House (formerly the Post Office Headquarters) on Marton Road was acquired by Middlesbrough Council at the time of the construction of the A66 Middlesbrough Bypass. It was approved for use as an archive repository and the conversion took place in the early 1980s. The service moved into the building in 1984 and work began to bring the collections together into one single place. A much improved and enlarged searchroom enabled the service to accommodate more visitors and be able to cope with ad-hoc users as well as those that had pre-booked. Exchange House also provided a fully equipped Conservation Studio with a qualified conservator being appointed in 1985. Previous to this, all conservation work had been carried out by Durham County Record Office.

In April 1996, Cleveland County Council was abolished and the four Unitary Authorities of Hartlepool, Middlesbrough, Redcar & Cleveland and Stockton took over. At this time the service was also renamed to Teesside Archives.

The service eventually outgrew Exchange House and is now temporarily operating from the Dorman Museum where a smaller Searchroom and a well equipped Conservation studio have been set up.
