= Southampton Archives =

Coordinates: 50°54′28.78″N 1°24′23.46″W

Southampton Archives holds the archives for the City of Southampton. The archives are held at the Civic Centre, Southampton. The collections reflect the maritime history of this port city as well as its civic and political history.

== Collections ==
The collections include:

- Central index of merchant seamen - containing more than 1.25 million merchant navy service record cards of people who served on British registered ships between 1918 and 1941.
- Local authority records - covering Southampton City Council and its predecessors since 1199.
- Local history & maritime digital archive - a collection of over 10,000 items reflecting the merchant shipping connections of Southampton and its port.
- "Titanic Voices" oral history collection. A collection relating to this ship which departed from Southampton on its final voyage, extracts from which were published in book form in 1994. The oral history and other records at the city archives were among the sources used by Julie Cook in her book, The Titanic and the City of Widows it left Behind (2020), which focussed on the relatives of the 549 crew from the City of Southampton who died when the ship sank.
