= Edmond Coignet =

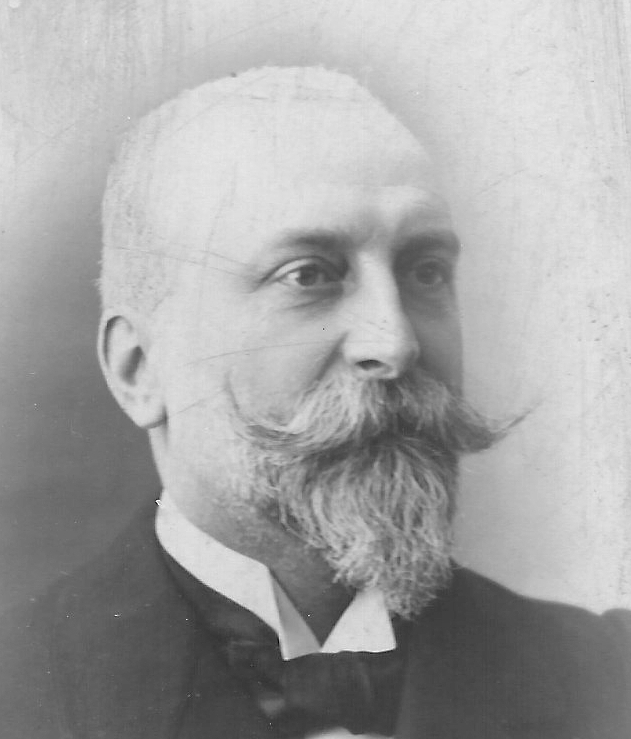
- Born: 4 July 1856; Ville d'Avray, France
- Died: 1915 (aged 58–59); Paris
- Education: École Centrale Paris
- Occupation: French entrepreneur

Edmond Coignet (4 July 1856 – 1915) was a French engineer and entrepreneur. He has been instrumental in the theory of reinforced concrete.

== Life and achievements ==
Coignet was the son of industrialist François Coignet (1814–1888) and educated at the École Centrale des Arts et Manufactures (École Centrale Paris). He was the inventor of the agglomerated concrete to strengthen the cement with metal inserts. He permanently reoriented the family business to construction. In 1892 he applied his innovative construction methods on the aqueduct of Achères in Paris. Coignet was the first to use reinforced concrete piles and built with the architect Jacques Hermant some of the first Parisian buildings in this material.
