= Coventry Archives =

English records archive and history centre

Coordinates: 52.407159°N 1.506098°W

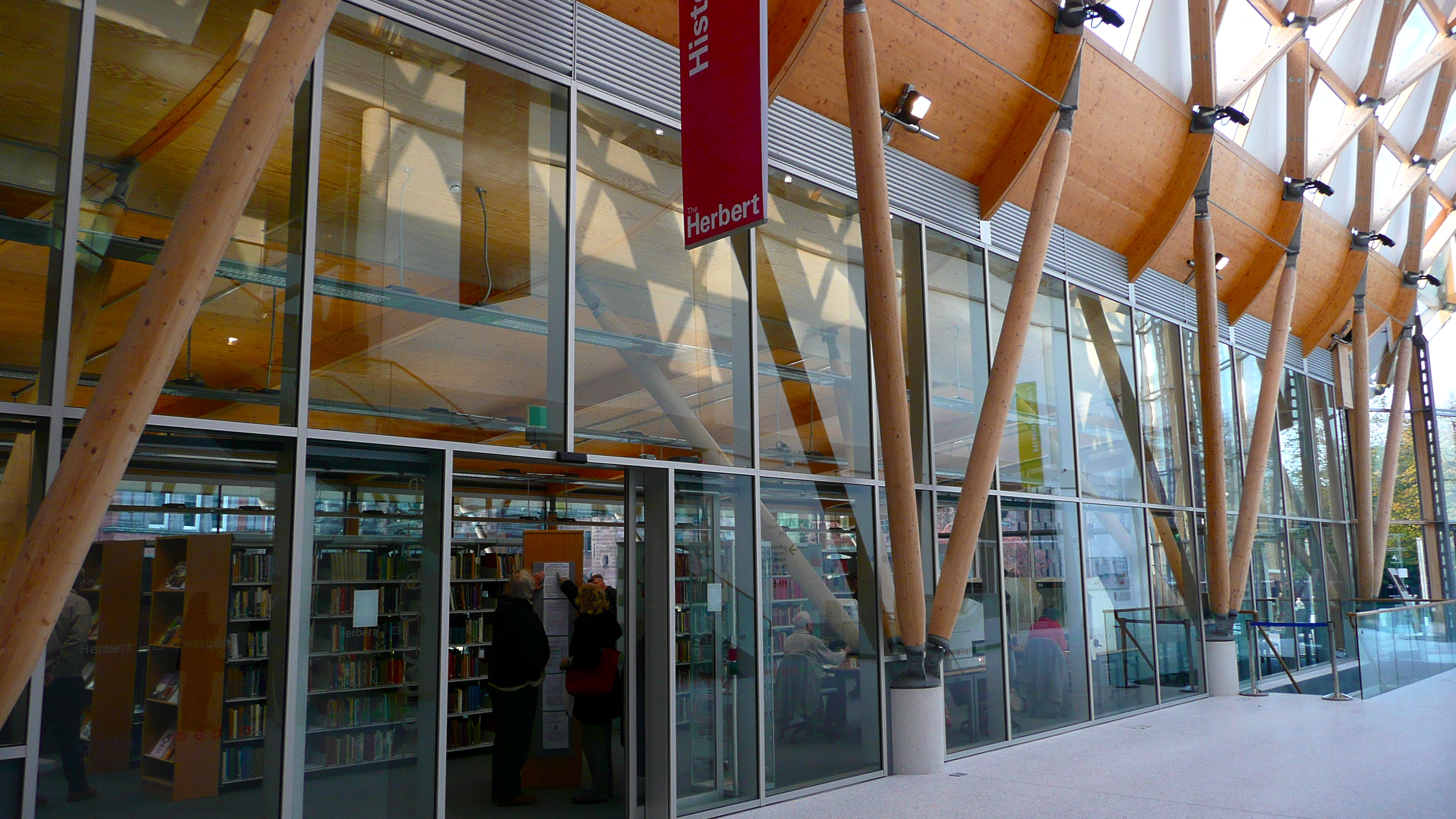
- The Coventry Archives from the covered court of Herbert Art Gallery and Museum.
- Established: 2008
- Location: Jordan Well, Coventry, England
- Type: Archives
- Curator: Victoria Northridge
- Owner: Culture Coventry
- Public transit access: Pool Meadow bus station
- Website: www.theherbert.org/history_centre/default.aspx

Coventry Archives is a records archive and local history centre for the city of Coventry, England. It is housed in Herbert Art Gallery and Museum and is one of 4 institutions owned by the Culture Coventry Trust, the other three being Herbert Art Gallery and Museum, the Lunt Roman Fort and the Coventry Transport Museum.

== History ==
The Archives were set up in 2008 during the refurbishment of Herbert Art Gallery and Museum, and was designed by Demco Interiors. It was set up to combine the former Coventry Archives and Local Studies Library.

In September 2018, the Coventry Archives underwent a name and brand change. It was renamed after the old 'Coventry History Centre'.

== Collections ==
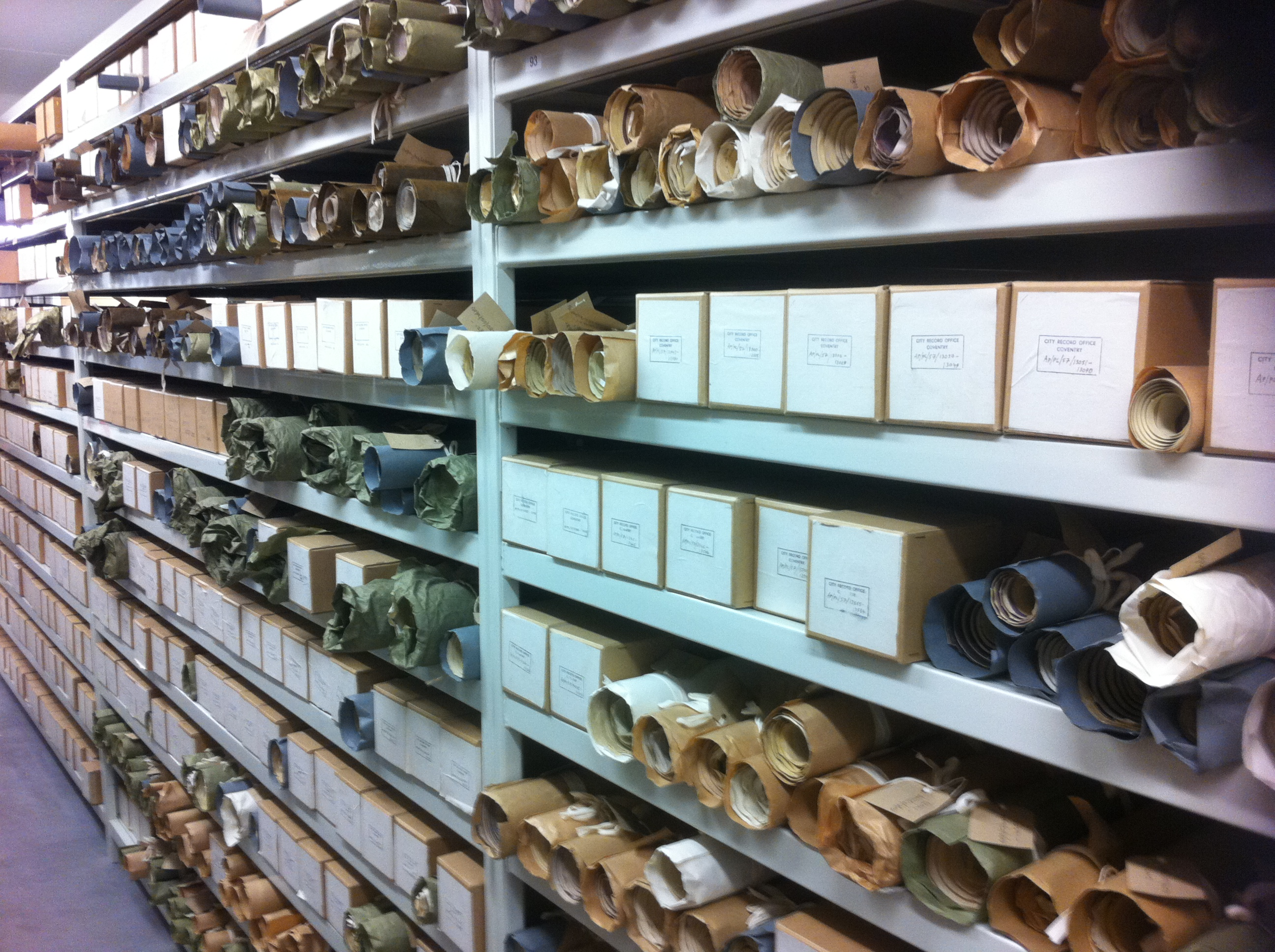
Documents on shelves in the archives' underground store.

The History Centre houses archive collections ranging from medieval times to the present day. Collections are available as:

- Oral history recordings
- Maps
- Plans
- Printed books and pamphlets
