= Powys Archives =

Archive in Powys, Wales

Coordinates: 52.2553°N 3.3775°W

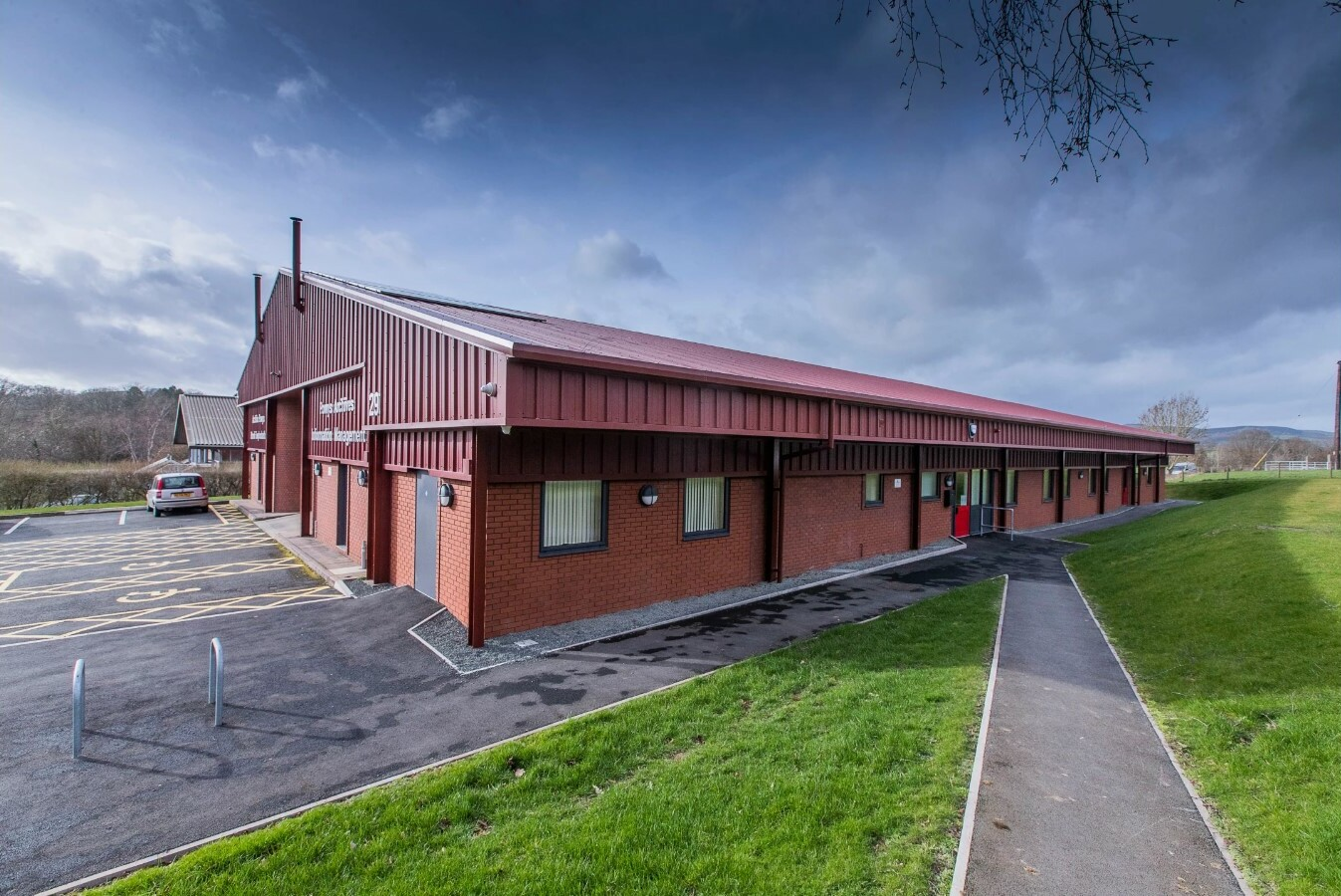
The archive building

Powys Archives (Welsh: Archifau Powys) is the official archive repository for the county of Powys. Located in Llandrindod Wells, the archive is responsible for collecting and protecting documents relating to all aspects of the history of Powys.

Powys Archives houses collections from the 14th century and they are available for view in the archive searchroom. Records can be used for all types of research: Tracing your family history; Discovering the history of your house; Finding out more about the history of your village or community; School or college projects; Investigating legal issues such as rights of way.
