= Lebrecht Photo Library =

Coordinates: 51.515050°N 0.192094°W

Lebrecht Music & Arts Photo Library
- Company type: Private
- Industry: Stock photo library
- Founded: 1992; 33 years ago
- Headquarters: St John's Wood, London, United Kingdom

The Lebrecht Photo Library was set up in 1992 by Elbie Lebrecht who worked as a specialist librarian, publishing editor and sculptor. Initially based on an archive of classical music images, it expanded to represent a number of private collections and photographers working in the field of music and the performing arts and general arts. It has grown to 175,000 images and has three sections: Music & Arts pictures at Lebrecht; Author Pictures at Lebrecht; Arts Images at Lebrecht. Notable photographers represented by the library include Betty Freeman and Wolfgang Suschitzky. Public institutions represented include New York Public Library for the Performing Arts and the Royal Academy of Music.
