= County record office =

Local authority repository

In the United Kingdom (and particularly in England and Wales) a county record office is usually a local authority repository, also called a county archives.

Such repositories employ specialist staff to administer and conserve the historic and the semi-current records of the parent body. They usually also preserve written materials from a great variety of independent local organisations, churches and schools, prominent families and their estates, businesses, solicitors' offices and ordinary private individuals.

Archives may have been acquired either through donation or (more generally) by deposit on long-term loan. Local authorities in certain larger cities sometimes administer their own separate city record office, operating along similar lines. Archive repositories are frequently – but by no means exclusively – used by local and family historians for the purposes of original research, since many records can very often have a continuing administrative or legal significance.

== Facilities ==
A record office will typically include public search rooms (including reference books, archive catalogues and other finding aids), environmentally controlled strongrooms, administrative offices, and quite often small exhibition areas (Note: The relevant British Standard for the storage and exhibition of archives, both on and off the premises, is BS 5454.) together with a conservation room for the specialist repair (Note: The relevant British Standard for the conservation and repair of documents is BS 4971.) of documents. Search rooms are generally open at their advertised times without charge, although many offices operate a reader's ticket system. Some, but not all, operate a fee-paying postal service for those who are unable to make personal research visits. All county record offices attempt to work in accordance with the appropriate official British Standard.

== Historical development of the UK archive network ==
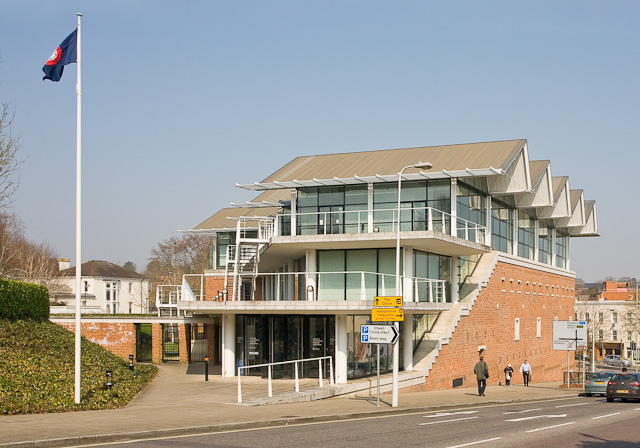
Hampshire Record Office, Sussex Street, Winchester

The earliest county record office in the modern sense was the Bedfordshire Record Office, established by George Herbert Fowler in 1913. To some extent it was operating within established traditions set by the London-based Public Record Office (now The National Archives), which first opened in 1838, or by other repositories overseas. Although the statutory operation of such county record offices under the Local Government (Records) Act 1962 was permissive rather than mandatory, the network has gradually expanded. Bristol Record Office (now Bristol Archives), opened in 1924, has been identified as the second local office to become established. The whole network now includes repositories – which operate largely independently of each other – throughout the whole of England and Wales (the most recent being Powys Archives, opened in the 1980s). Often the foundations of many of the earlier collections were the extensive surviving archives originating from a county's quarter sessions – in the county of Somerset a special muniment room had actually been provided for these as early as 1617. There are also many broadly similar repositories in Scotland, Ireland, and overseas. To varying extents, they will also help with the care of the county's semi-current or "modern records" using records management principles, as well as with the selection and preservation of today's records (both paper and digital) for future generations.

During the 19th and 20th centuries, some older libraries had also begun to maintain archive collections from their local area, although their facilities and the scope of their collections could vary considerably – as might their official legal status. There are often overlaps between local studies and record office collections, particularly with respect to printed ephemera, maps, photographs, old newspapers and local reference books. A number of record offices now operate in a formal association with one or more of their county’s principal local studies libraries, although the two professions of archivist and librarian generally remain quite distinct.

== Legal status for holding public records and other categories ==
Public access to central government archives (technically known as public records) and by extension to local government records was previously regulated in accordance with instruments such as the Public Records Act 1958 and the Public Records Act 1967. The 1958 Act enabled county repositories to be appointed by the Lord Chancellor to hold individually specified classes of Public Records – including local court records. (Note: In practice any such appointments to hold Public Records (as defined by the 1958 Act), together with manorial and tithe records, are made on the recommendation of staff of the National Archives – formerly the Public Record Office – following inspections which can be repeated every few years.) Access to material within record offices in England & Wales is now largely regulated by the Data Protection Act 1998 and the Freedom of Information Act 2000, although these do not necessarily cover privately deposited items, and closure periods may apply in certain cases. (Note: A summary of relevant legislation including the status of record offices was provided by Knightbridge A. A. H., Archive Legislation in the United Kingdom (Society of Archivists Information Leaflet, 1985), although this does not cover more recent changes.)

Since 1929 many county record offices in England have also been designated by the local bishop as a diocesan record office, latterly operating under the terms of the Parochial Registers and Records Measure 1978. Such record offices are often also formally recognised by the Master of the Rolls as approved repositories for manorial and tithe records (in accordance with the Law of Property Act 1922 and the Tithe Act 1936 (as amended by the Local Government Records Act 1962).

== Guides to the contents of record offices ==
Many county record offices have issued printed guides to their collections, although the addition of new materials can make these go rapidly out of date. Furthermore, many offices also have considerable backlogs of uncatalogued materials. From the 1990s onwards, an increasing number of offices have launched online catalogues of varying completeness, linked to their respective websites.

An earlier summary of archive repositories, including brief details of the development of each office together with outlines of their principal holdings, is provided by Janet Foster and Julia Sheppard’s British Archives (4th edition, 2002). Select lists for certain specialised categories covering many UK repositories have also been issued by a variety of other publishers, notably the Federation of Family History Societies.
