= Thomas Ashburton Picken =

Scottish engraver; 1818–1891

- Born: c. 1818; Govan, Glasgow, Scotland
- Died: 23 January 1891 (aged 72); London Charterhouse, England
- Resting place: Highgate Cemetery
- Known for: Lithographs: The destruction of both Houses of Parliament (1834); Funeral of the Duke of Wellington (1853) among many others
- Style: Lithography, Illustration, watercolor painting
- Father: Andrew Picken
- Relatives: Andrew Picken (brother)

Thomas Ashburton Picken (c. 1818 – 23 January 1891), known professionally as T. Picken, was a Scottish-born watercolourist, engraver and lithographer working in England between around 1834 and 1875. He worked for the printing firm Day and Haghe (later Day & Son) for many years, and first came to notice for his lithograph of The Destruction of Both Houses of Parliament when he was only about 16 years old. Although there is no evidence that he travelled abroad, he produced many lithographs of foreign parts after paintings by other artists. He specialised in detailed images of landscape, architecture, events of war, and ships. He produced lithographs of SS Great Eastern and the laying of the Atlantic cable, and he illustrated books.

Picken's father was the Scots novelist Andrew Picken, and his brother Andrew was a lithographer who also trained with Day and Haghe. Picken ended his days as a Poor Brother at The London Charterhouse, alongside his brother, James Canning (or Channing) Picken. His lithographs are now in many collections, including the Royal Collection Trust, the Library of Congress collection and the Royal Academy collection.

Picken exhibited his own paintings from 1846 to 1875.

== Arts background ==
Picken's father was Scots writer Andrew Picken (Paisley 1788 – London 23 November 1833), who published various novels including Traditional stories of old families (1833). Thomas' mother was Janet E. Coxon (or Coxson) (1793 – South Stoneham 1871). Andrew Picken senior's first book, Tales and Sketches of the West of Scotland (1824), about historical changes there, "gave great offence to the citizens of Glasgow" and this drove him out of the town. He died in London, where his family were "left in very precarious circumstances" when his son Thomas was around 15 years old. Thomas Picken was one of four sons, three of whom were lithographers. Two of his elder brothers were the lithographer Andrew (1815 – London 24 June 1845) and lithographic artist (later wine merchant) James Canning (or Channing) (Dublin ca.1817 – Brentford 1899). (Note: For sibling relationship with Thomas Picken, birth date and occupation, see censuses: 1841, 1851, and 1881.) He had two younger sisters: Sophia (b. Glasgow 14 December 1821), and Eleanor Emma (Glasgow ca.1822 – Portsea 21 July 1898) who, as a miniaturist portrait painter, exhibited at the Royal Academy in 1842.

== Life ==
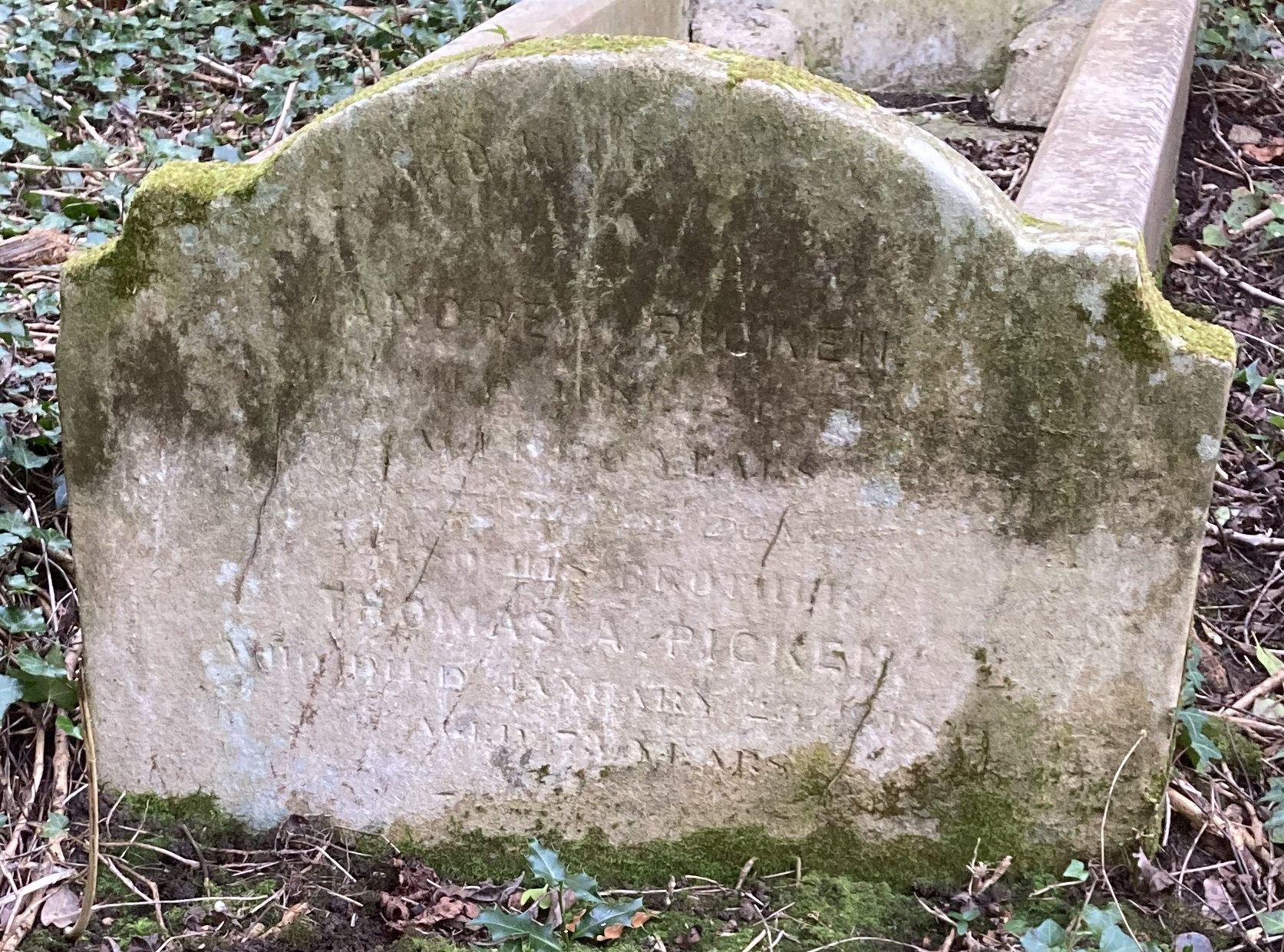
Grave of Thomas Ashburton Picken in Highgate Cemetery

Thomas Ashburton Picken was born around 1818, in Govan, Glasgow. (Note: It is the 1881 census which connects the name "Thomas Ashburton Picken", the occupation of lithographer, the brother James Canning/Channing Picken, and the birthplace of Govan, Glasgow, which are confirmed separately elsewhere. The 1851–1881 census consistently indicates a date of birth 1818–1819, and the GRO index indicates a date of birth 1819. This is sufficiently consistent to assume a date of birth circa 1818. Please see the following censuses: 1851, 1861, 1871, and 1881.) He never married. In 1841 he was living in Great Randolph Street, Kentish Town, London, with his mother Janet, his brother James, and his sisters Emma and Sophia, and describing himself as an artist. In 1851 the census finds him living at 13 Murray Street, Camden, with his brother James and his sister Sophia. By 1861 he was lodging at 27 Rutland Street, St Pancras, London, with the family of sculptor Thomas Woolner (1825–1892). In 1871 he was living as a lodger at 11 Rutland Street, describing himself as a lithographic artist.

Picken and his brother James Canning (or Channing) Picken were accepted as Poor Brothers or male pensioners at the Charterhouse, London. Thomas was described there as a former lithographer and James as a former wine merchant, and Thomas was registered in 1879. On 23 January 1891 he died at the Charterhouse. He was buried on 24 January 1891 with his brother Andrew on the west side of Highgate Cemetery. (Note: Both the death certificate and the burial register give the name Thomas Ashburton Picken.)

== Career ==
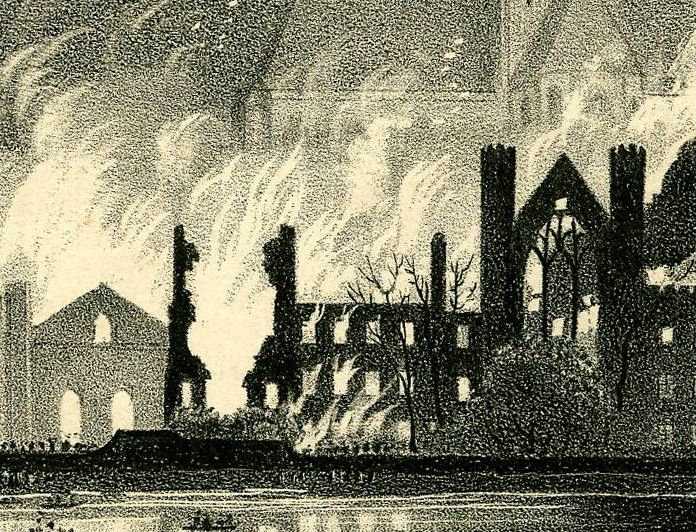
Destruction of both Houses of Parliament (extract), 1834: Picken's first known published work.

Since Thomas Picken was working for Day and Haghe, (Note: Day and Haghe was a single company while William Day and Louis Haghe were working together. See Lancaster Gazette, 13 June 1835, p.1 col.2, which says, "Views of the town of Lancaster ... printed at the establishment of Day and Haghe lithographers to the King".) later Day & Son, in 1834 at the age of around sixteen years, and served the company for the rest of his career, it is likely that he served his apprenticeship there, as did his brother Andrew. He was working as a watercolourist, engraver, lithographer and painter for that company in Camden, London from at least 1834, and flourished until at least 1875.

Probably one of Picken's earliest publications was his lithograph of The Destruction of Both Houses of Parliament, 1834, executed when he was only about 16 years old. (Note: See File:Conflagration of both Houses of Parliament by Thomas Ashburton Picken 001.jpg for the creation and publication date of 1834 (bottom right hand corner of image).) No other original artist is credited for this work, so it is not impossible that the initial sketches were undertaken by Picken himself. The authorship of original works on which lithographs were based was usually credited, but such works are often unavailable. Therefore, the question arises as to the extent to which the mid-19th-century lithographers were responsible for the final composition and detail of their engravings. The Day and Haghe lithographer William Simpson said, "In lithography ... we [at times] had to work out rough materials into pictures ... if a man has any stuff in him it finds development."

No evidence of foreign travel has been found, but many of Picken's works after other artists represent locations around the world. He made detailed images of landscape, architecture, events of war, and ships. (Note: For examples of pictures of worldwide locations and for images of landscape, architecture, war and ships, see Category:Thomas Ashburton Picken on Wikimedia Commons) He illustrated books, (Note: See Book illustration section below) and produced lithographs of SS Great Eastern, and the laying of the Atlantic cable.

=== Selected works ===
- Palace of Westminster: Destruction of both Houses of Parliament, as seen from the Surrey side (1834), by Thomas Ashburton Picken.
- Palace of Westminster: Destruction of both Houses of Parliament as seen from Abingdon Street on the Night of October 16th 1834 (1834), by Thomas Ashburton Picken.
- King's College Hospital. North or entrance front (ca.1842), after architect Thomas Bellamy (1798–1876).
- View of Quebec City, Canada (1845), after the artist and topographical engineer Benjamin Beaufoy (1814–1879).
- St Paul's Cathedral (1851), after artist George Sidney Shepherd (ca.1786–1862).
- Horse Guards Parade: General view (1851), after George Sidney Shepherd.
- Wellington Arch, Hyde Park Corner (1852), after Louis Haghe (1806–1885).
- The Great Eastern under weigh July 23rd (circa 1860).
- Native Village and Palaver House near Cavalla (1868) after George Townshend Fox (1810–1886).

=== Some lithographs ===
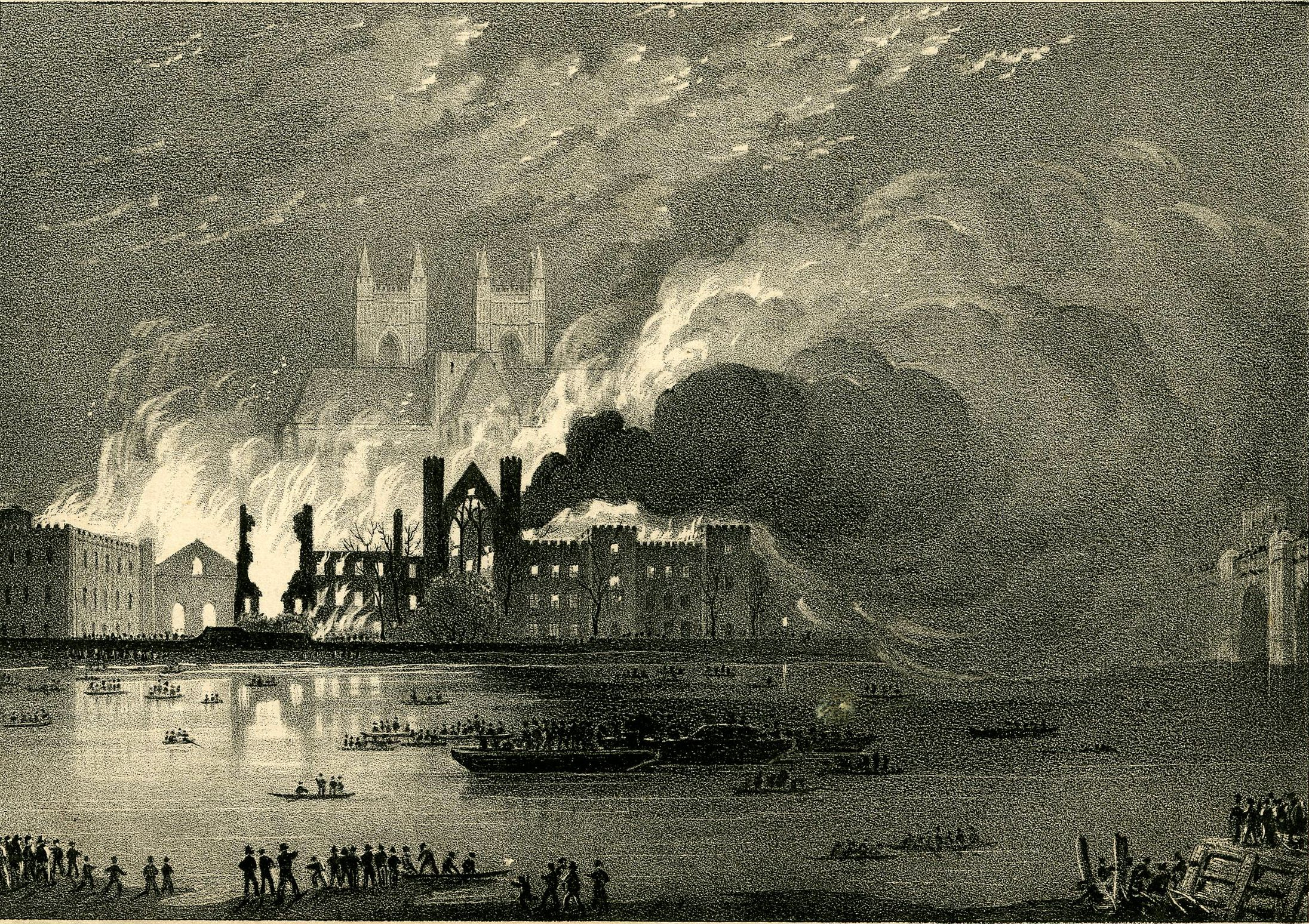
The Destruction of both Houses of Parliament by Picken, 1834

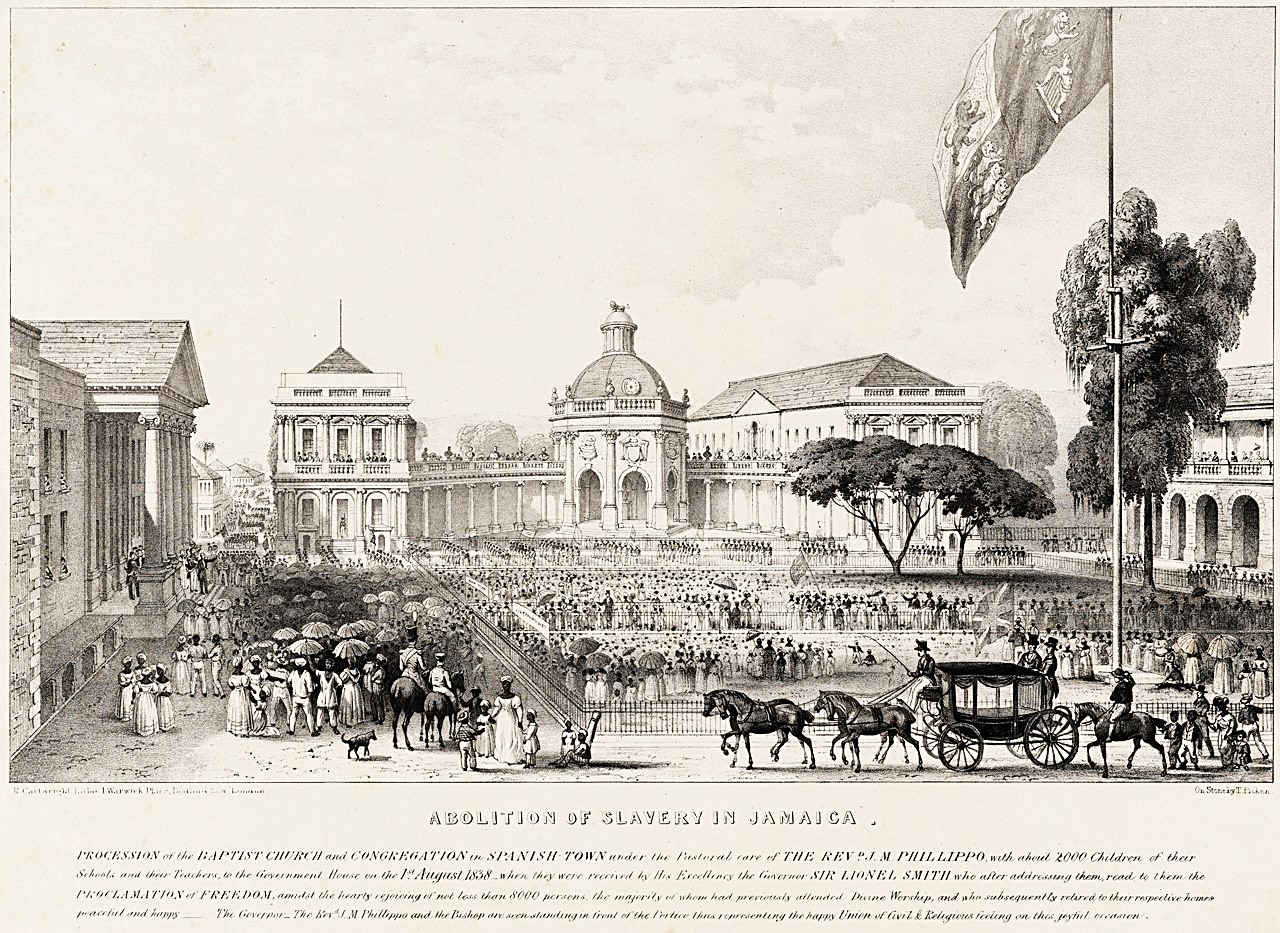
Abolition of Slavery in Jamaica, 1838

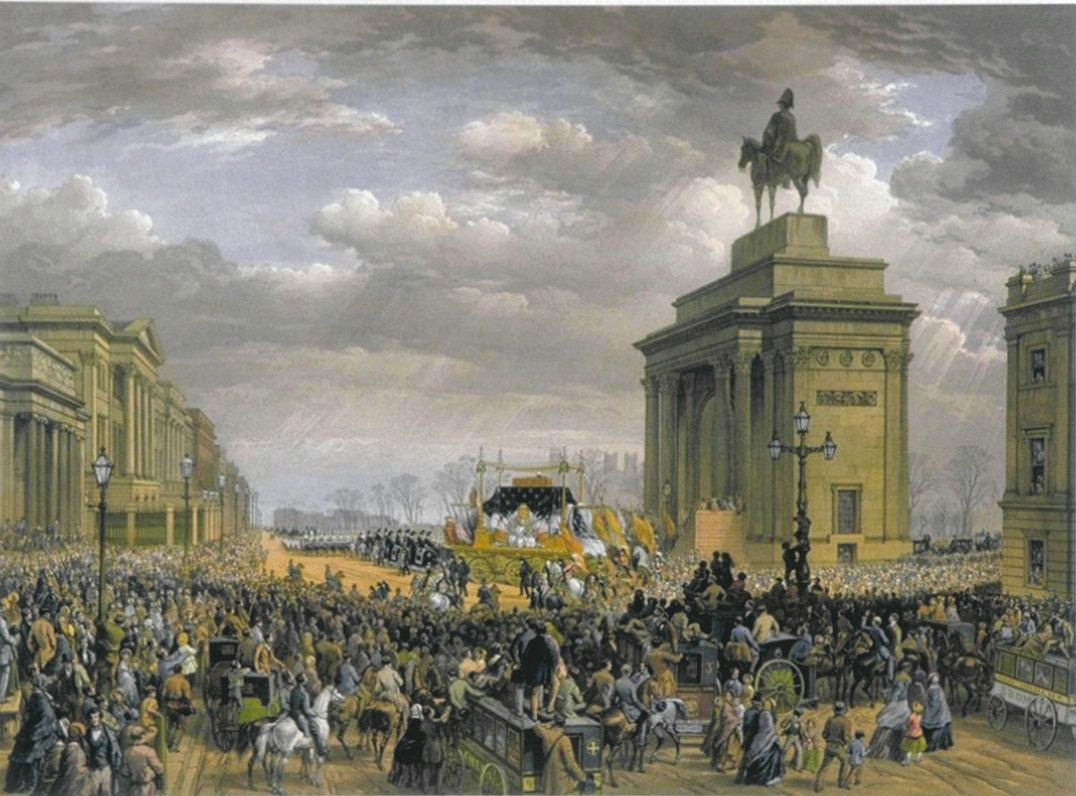
Funeral of the Duke of Wellington by Picken after Louis Haghe, 1853.

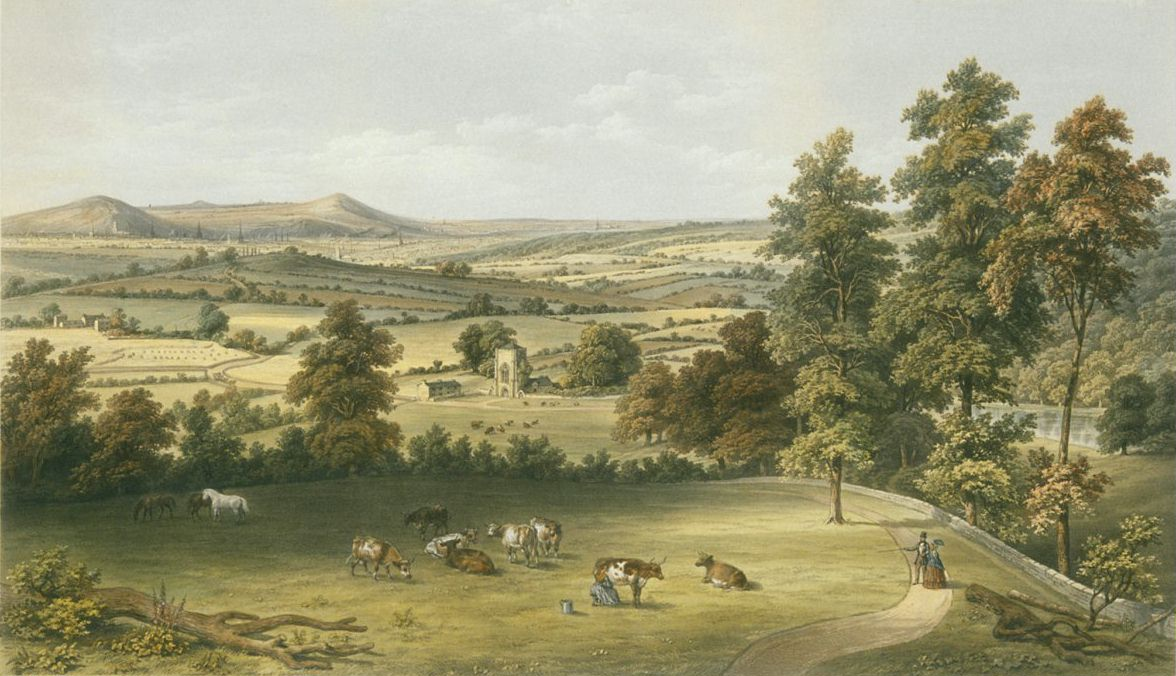
Dale Abbey by Picken after William Ibbitt, 1857.

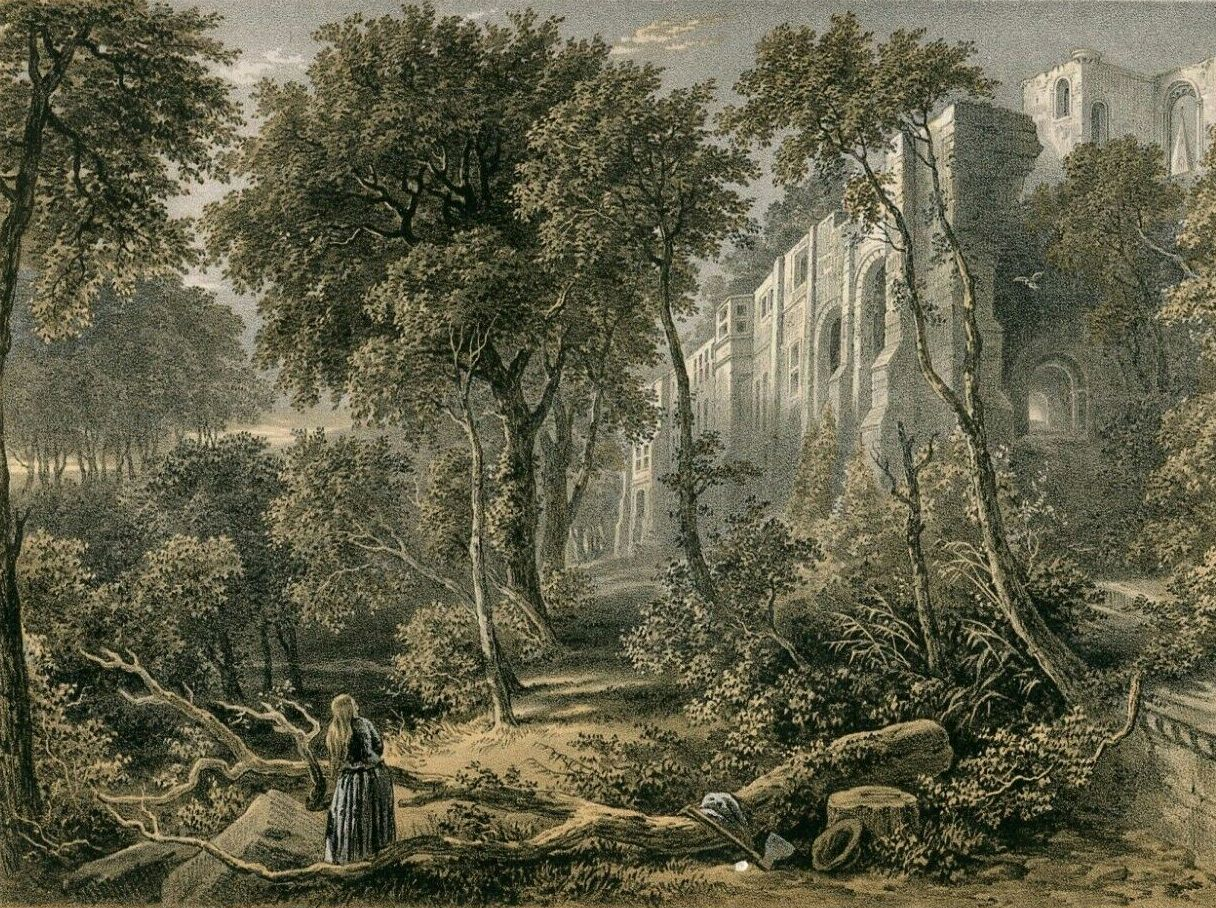
Dunfermline by Picken after David Octavius Hill, 1858.

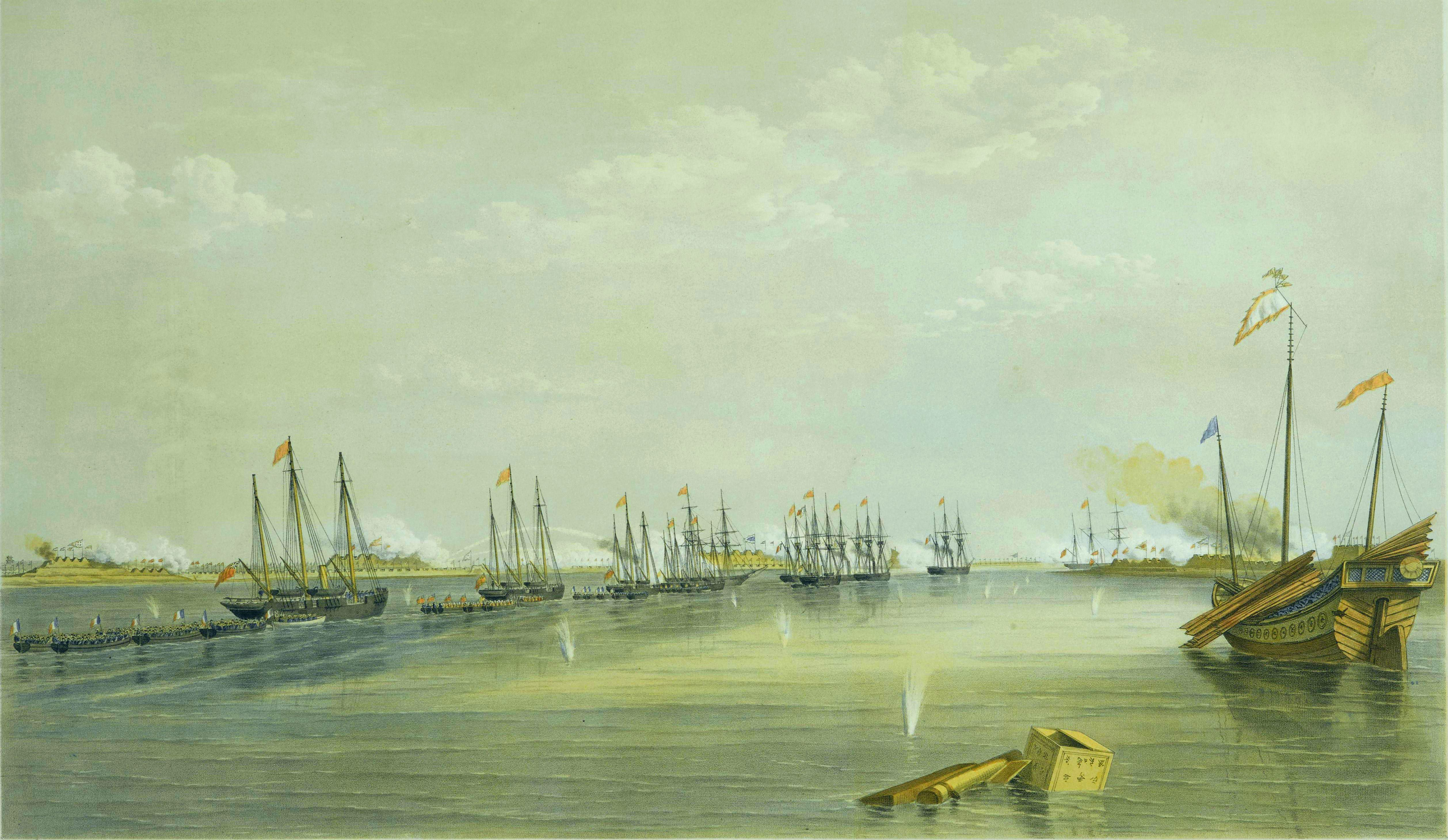
Attack on the Peiho forts, illustrating the Second Opium War in China, by Picken after F.I.E. Bedwell, 1859.

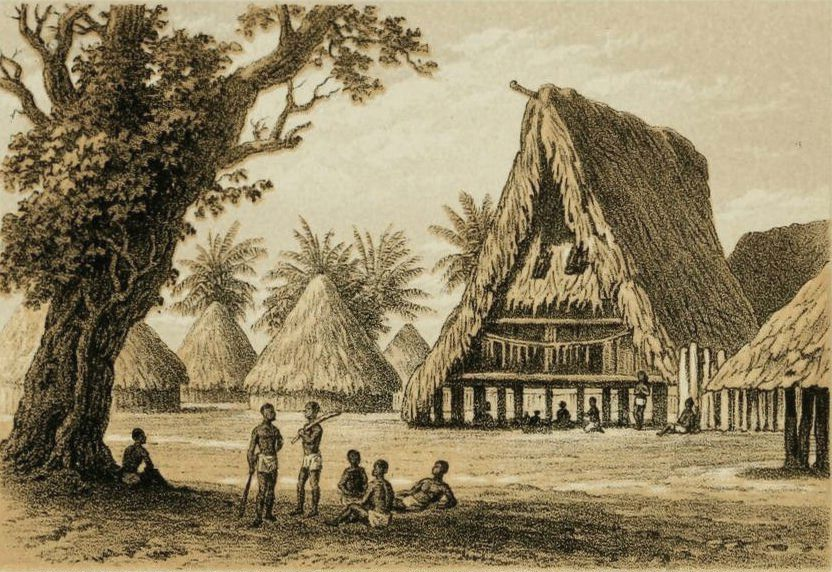
Native Village and Palaver House near Cavalla at Cape Palmas, West Africa, by Picken after George Townshend Fox, 1868.

=== Works published as sets ===
- Picken, Thomas Ashburton (1851). Ten Colour Lithographs by T. Picken After G. S. Shepherd in the Guildhall Library (Set of lithographs, 14 pages). London: R. Ackerman 1851, Guildhall Library Publications 1987. ISBN 9780900422249.
- Crofton, Mrs William (1854). Eight views, for the benefit of the County Leitrim protestant orphan society from the original drawing. Ackerman. The eight engravings were lithograph copies by Thomas Ashburton Picken of Frances Emilia Crofton's original paintings.
- Walker, Edmund (1852). A Series of Twelve Views of the Principal Buildings in London (PDF). London: Lloyd Bros & Co. pp. 58–59.. (This is a bound set of lithographs after Edmund Walker, rather than an illustrated book: Westminster Abbey; General Post Office; Greenwich Hospital; The Treasury Whitehall; The Quadrant Regent Street; St Paul's Cathedral, St Martin's Church; Trafalgar Square; Royal Exchange; Buckingham Palace; London Bridge; British Museum).

=== Book illustration ===
(In date order)

- Allen, William (1840). Picturesque views on the river Niger : sketched during Lander's last visit in 1832-33. London: J. Murray. "Printer of plates: Day and Haghe. Lithographers: Thomas Picken, William Walton, Charles Haghe"
- Roberts, David (1842–1849). The Holy Land Yesterday and Today: Lithographs and Diaries (Swan Hill Press reprint 1997 ed.). Swan Hill Press. ISBN 978-1853108716. (Lithographs after David Roberts).
- Picken, Thomas Ashburton (1843). A view of Cheltenham in its past and present state (4 ed.). London: Day and Haghe. "The illustrations to this work comprise, in addition to a coloured plan of the town, corrected to the present time - a series of six beautiful views, lithographed by T. Picken from drawings taken for the work, and printed in tint by Day and Haghe. (Also wood engravings by other artists)"
- Richardson, Charles James (1851). Studies Of Ornamental Design. London: John Weale. (Thomas Picken is credited for some of the lithographs).
- Pyne, James Baker (1853). Views of the English Lake District. London: Thos. Agnew & Son. (At least one lithograph in this book is by Picken after Pyne. Pyne is sometimes listed as "Payne".)
- Lawson, John Parker (1 January 1858). Scotland Delineated. A series of views of the principal cities and towns, particularly of Edinburgh and its environs (British Library Historical Print 2011 ed.). London: Originally Day & Son, and R. Griffin & Co. ISBN 978-1241529420..(Lithographs after William Simpson, Sir William Allan, Clarkson Frederick Stanfield, George Cattermole, William Leighton Leitch, Thomas Creswick, David Roberts, James Duffield Harding, Joseph Nash, Horatio McCulloch, J. M. W. Turner, David Octavius Hill).
- Pyne, James Baker (1858). The Lake Scenery of England Drawn on Stone (Nabu Press reprint 2013 ed.). London: Originally Day & Son. ISBN 978-1287827184. (Lithographs after James Baker Pyne).
- Newton, Sir Charles Thomas; Pullan, R.P. (1862). A history of discoveries at Halicarnassus, Cnidus and Branchidae. London. (Lithograph plate XI after B. Spackman).
- Falkener, Edward (1862). Ephesus, And The Temple Of Diana. London: Day & Son. (Some of the illustrations are lithographed by Picken).
- Hinchliff, Thomas Woodbine (1863). South American sketches; or, A visit to Rio Janeiro, the Organ Mountains, La Plata, and the Parana. London: Longman, Roberts & Green. "Six illustrations by T. Picken (lithographer)"

=== Exhibitions ===
- Royal Academy of Arts (1857): One watercolour, The Castle Rock, Lynton, North Devon.
- Society of Artists of Great Britain (1846–75): ten watercolours.

== Collections ==
Besides the list below, Picken's lithographs are in numerous collections, including: Museum of Science and Industry, Victoria and Albert Museum, Government Art Collection, Library of Congress Collection, Museum of London, National Army Museum, National Library of Poland, National Maritime Museum, London, National Railway Museum, People's Collection, Wales, Royal Academy collection, Royal Museums Greenwich, University of British Columbia, University of Edinburgh collection, Villanova University, Yale Center for British Art, and the British Museum.

- Royal Collection Trust: Five of the prints from the Eight Views set (1854), including Killarney, Dunbroody Abbey, Lough Rynn, Muckruss Abbey and Castle Otway after Frances Emilia Crofton, (Note: The Eight Views set is held in various other collections. See Frances Emilia Crofton) and Launch of the Trafalgar (1842) by T.A. Picken after William Ranwell.
- Guildhall Library print room, Wakefield Collection: St Paul's Cathedral (1851).
- London Metropolitan Archives and Guildhall Art Gallery: Palace of Westminster: Destruction of both Houses of Parliament, as seen from the Surrey side (1834), Palace of Westminster: Destruction of both Houses of Parliament as seen from Abingdon Street on the Night of 16th October 1834 (1834), Horse Guards Parade: General view (1851), Wellington Arch, Hyde Park Corner (1852),
- Wellcome Collection: King's College Hospital. North or entrance front (ca.1842), after Thomas Bellamy, People strolling along Old Well Walk, Cheltenham (1842) by T. Picken after W. Hughes.
- National Library of Wales, Welsh Landscape Collection: Various lithographs including Conwy Tubular Bridge (1849) after S. Crowther.

== Reviews ==
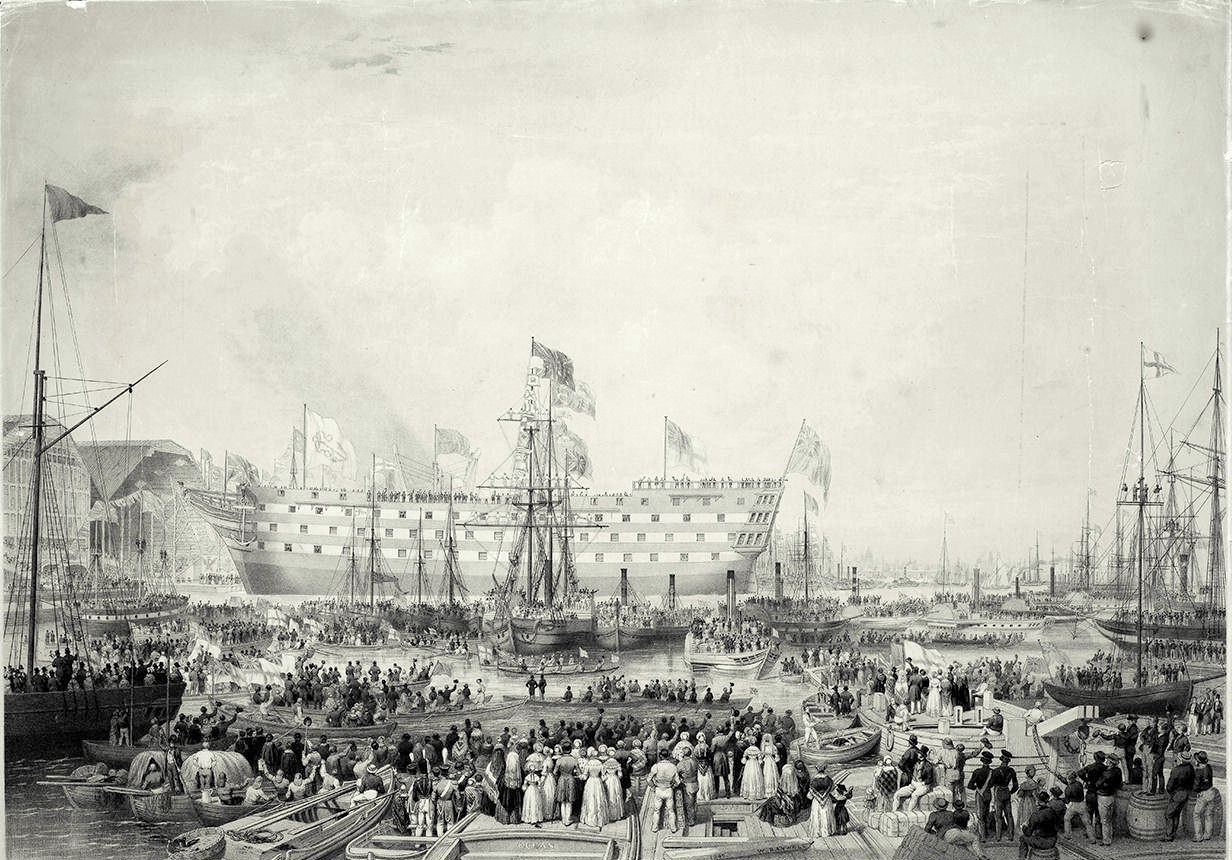
Launch of the Trafalgar by Picken after William Ranwell, 1842

- Messrs Ackerman of the Strand have just brought out a beautiful lithograph representation of the Launch of the Trafalgar drawn by Mr Ranwell and lithographed by Mr T. Picken. So far as our acquaintance with art goes, this is the first attempt that has been made to do full justice, by pictorial representation, to that soul-stirring scene to every Englishman - a ship launch. The artist could not have made a better selection of subject than the one he has chosen. The launch of the Trafalgar presented, perhaps, the most animating scene of joyousness that ever occurred in this country. More brilliant assemblages take place at Coronations and other great state ceremonies; but the glitter of a pageant has always a certain coldness associated with its formalities. Here, however, was a kind of undress scene of royalty - a monarch brought into immediate contact with her people, and sharing with them in feelings which form their mutual security. Those who were present can never forget the scene - a scene from which, with its multitudinous objects, we should have considered beyond the reach of pictorial art, if we had not seen Mr Ranwell's admirable delineation of the subject. The moment which the artist has perpetuated in the beautiful lithograph before us, is that in which the noble vessel descended majestically into the water, amid the heartwarming huzzas of countless thousands. The situation of the spectator is on the river below the slip - a line of yachts, barges and other craft, with their crowded docks forming the immediate foreground. The figures are admirably disposed and brought up with all the sharpness of a line engraving. - Intermediately is a patch of water with a few light row-boats, and then a line of steamers with their thronged and brilliant assemblages. Next, occupying the centre of the picture, is the noble vessel herself, just settling into the water, a sufficient space being left between her bow and entrance of the dock to discover the Royal party. To describe the various accessory aids which the artist has judiciously drawn into his subject would occupy a page; whilst we only have space left to observe generally that this splendid specimen of lithography is a perfect novelty in art. We had no conception so large a drawing crowded with thousands of figures could be attempted by this process with any chance of success - whilst in distinctness of outline, in sharpness and clearness of body, in delicacy of lights and in fulness of tone his magnificent picture has, as we previously observed, all the power of a line engraving; and as a specimen of lithography stands without a rival. ("Launch of the Trafalgar", Kentish Mercury, 12 March 1842). (Note: This long review has been included here in full, in order to show the enthusiastic effect that lithographic development and detail had on people during this era, and how Picken and his employers were at the forefront of this development in 1842.)

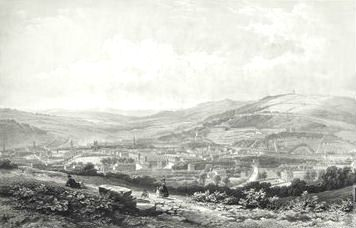
View of Bath from Sham Castle after John Syer, 1850. (Note: John Syer's original painting of Bath from Sham Castle is in Victoria Art Gallery, Bath, and can be seen here: File:Vew of Bath from Sham Castle by John Syer.jpg)

- Bath from Sham Castle drawn on stone by T. Picken, from a painting by J. Syer. A very beautiful lithograph engraving of the city of Bath has recently been published by Mr Everitt, of the Repository of Arts in that town. The view is taken from Sham Castle, and the town appears unfolded as a map, all the streets and principal buildings being represented with the strictest regard to topographical accuracy. The surrounding country is also seen for many miles, and independently of the value of the engraving in an historical point of view, and as a work of reference, it is commendable for its general fidelity to nature and artistic treatment. ("Bath from Sham Castle", Morning Post, 28 September 1850).

== Further research ==
- Engen, Rodney K.; Somerset, H. (1 July 1979). Dictionary of Victorian engravers, print publishers and their works. London: Somerset House. ISBN 978-0914146865.
