= William Day (lithographer) =

British artist (1797–1845)

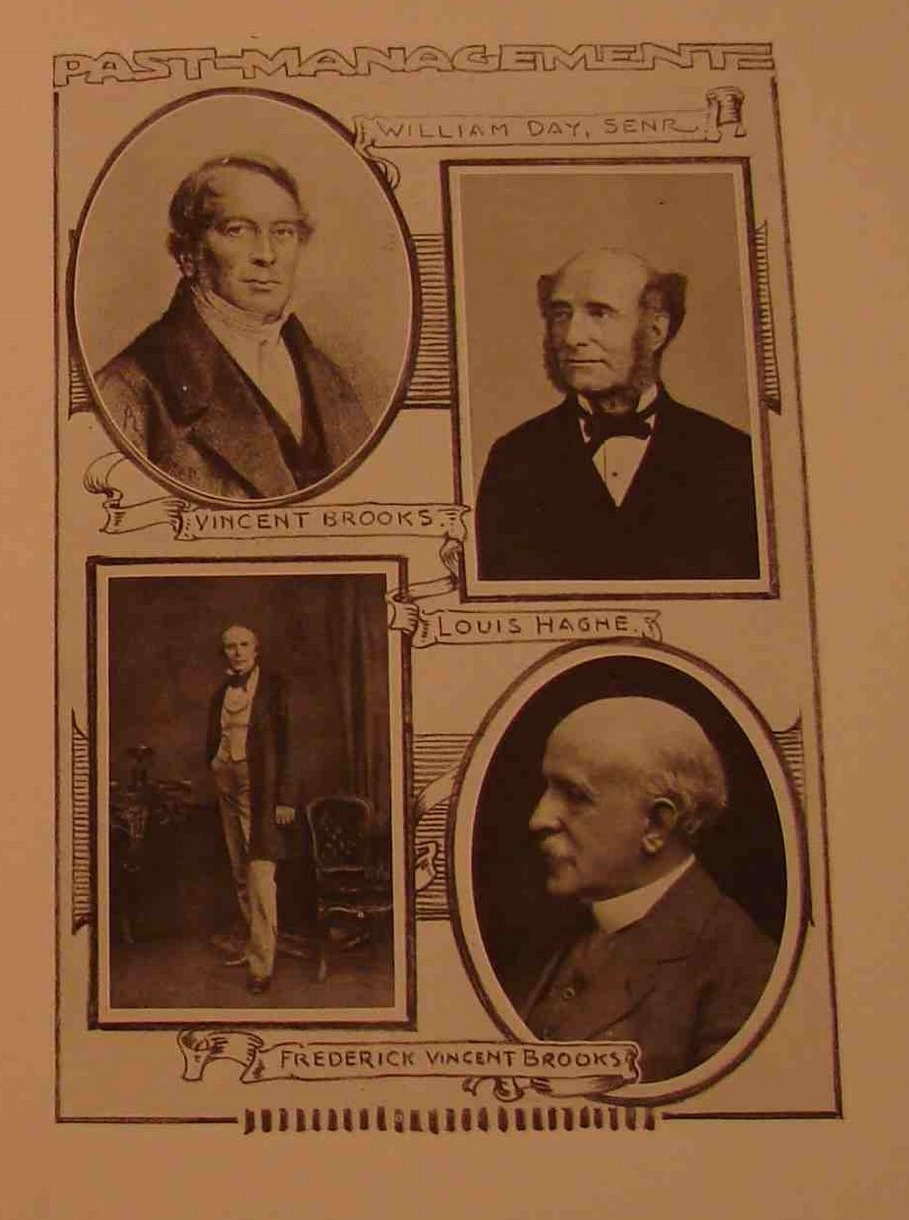
Portrait of William Day snr on the page from the programme from the celebration of the Centenary of Vincent Brooks, Day & Son Ltd.

William Day snr (1797–1845) was a lithographer and watercolour artist in partnership with Louis Haghe, forming the lithographic firm of Day & Haghe, famous in early Victorian London. The firm printed lithographs dealing with an enormous variety of topics, including hunting scenes, topographical views and genre images. Their work was so technically superior that in 1838, they were appointed 'Lithographers to the Queen.' Two of the lithographers employed by Day and Haghe were Andrew Picken and Thomas Ashburton Picken.

His son William Day jnr is recorded as being 27 years in the 1851 census and with the occupation of copperplate engraver and printer, living at 19 Lorraine Place, Islington, married to Elizabeth Rees (24 years old) from Gloucester, and with 2 sons William J. (2 yrs) and James R. (1 yr). Appearing in the same census record is William Day jnr's elder sister Caroline A Nicholls (30 years) married to John R Nicholls (38 years).

William Day snr probably had a second son, John Bellence Day, who in 1854 married a Rose Isabel Rees, sister of Elizabeth. Rose shows up in the 1861 census in Claines, Worcestershire as a visitor from Buenos Aires and married to a lithographer. The 1881 census has Caroline Nicholls staying with Dr. W.G. Grace and his wife Agnes Nicholls Day, her niece, the daughter of William Day jnr., who was also W.G. Grace's first cousin.
