= Louis Haghe =

Belgian lithographer, watercolourist

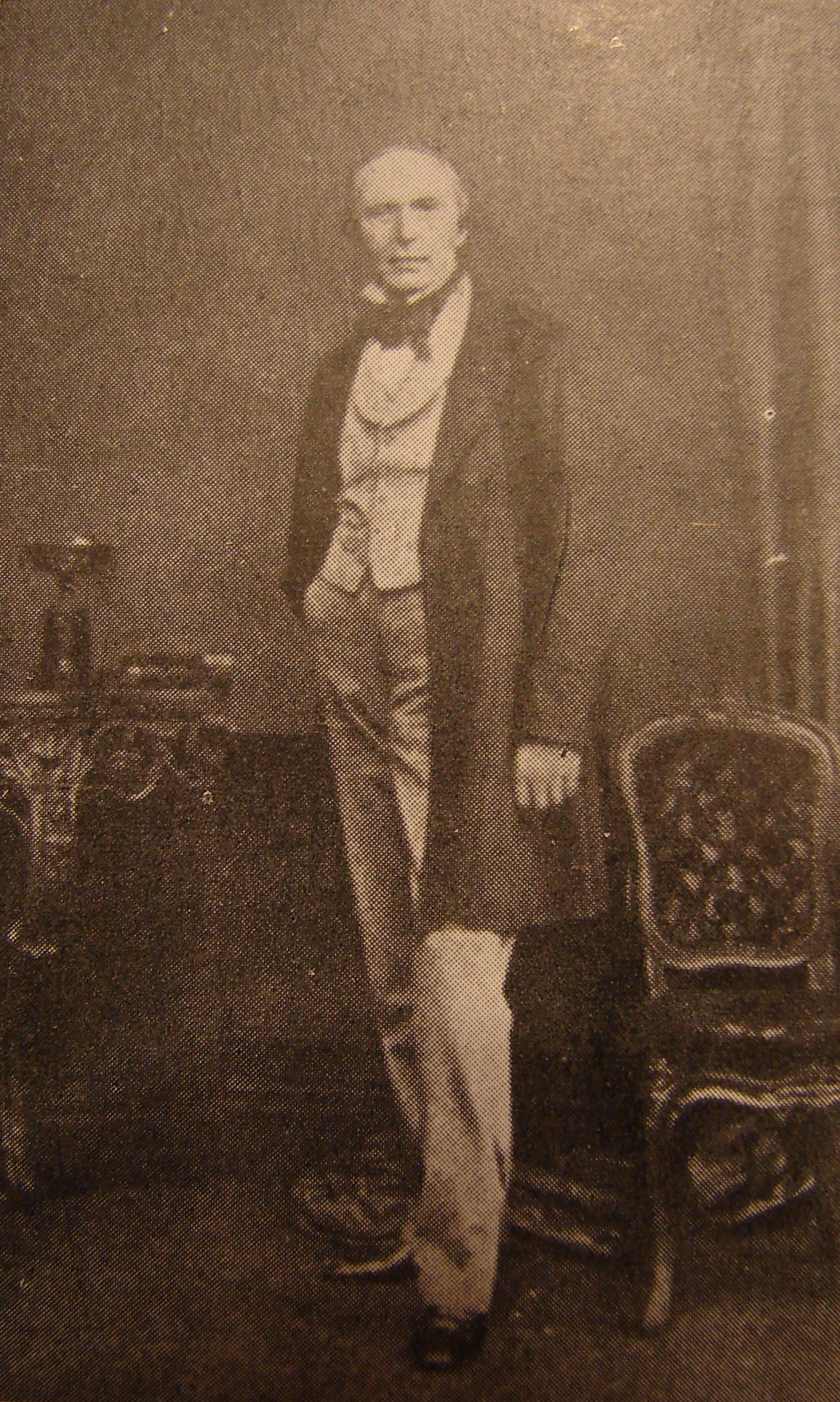
- Born: 17 March 1806; Tournai, then in the First French Empire
- Died: 9 March 1885 (aged 78); Stockwell, London
- Known for: lithographic printing

Louis Haghe (17 March 1806 – 9 March 1885) was a lithographer and watercolourist from the Netherlands and then the United Kingdom.

His father and grandfather had practised as architects. Training in his teens in watercolour painting, he found work in the relatively new art of lithography when the first press was set up in Tournai. He visited England to find work, and settled there permanently in 1823.

Together with William Day (1797–1845), around 1830 he formed the partnership Day & Haghe, which became the most famous early Victorian firm of lithographic printing in London.

Day and Haghe created and printed lithographs dealing with a wide range of subjects, such as hunting scenes, architecture, topographical views and genre depictions. They pioneered the new techniques for chromolithography as well as hand-tinted lithographs. After William's death in 1845, the firm became known as 'Day & Son'. They were pioneers in developing the medium of the colour lithograph.

In 1838, Day and Haghe were appointed 'Lithographers to the Queen'. Possibly his most ambitious project was providing 250 images for David Roberts' The Holy Land, Syria, Idumea, Arabia, Egypt, and Nubia printed between 1842 and 1849. Roberts praised his skill and artistry, although John Ruskin called it 'forced'.

From the mid-1850s Haghe concentrated more on his watercolours, and gained a reputation for his architectural scenes of northern Europe, with his pictures bought and displayed by the Victoria and Albert Museum. He also painted in oils, which were exhibited at the British Institution. He became president of the New Society of Painters in Water Colours from 1873 to 1884.

Haghe's artistic works were achieved in spite of a deformity in his right hand since birth. He died at Stockwell Road, in south London, on 9 March 1885 and was buried at West Norwood Cemetery.

His younger brother Charles Haghe (d. 1888) (also known as Charles Hague) was employed as an assistant at Day and Haghe, and remained there after Louis left. Also at the company were lithographers Andrew Picken and Thomas Ashburton Picken.

== Gallery ==
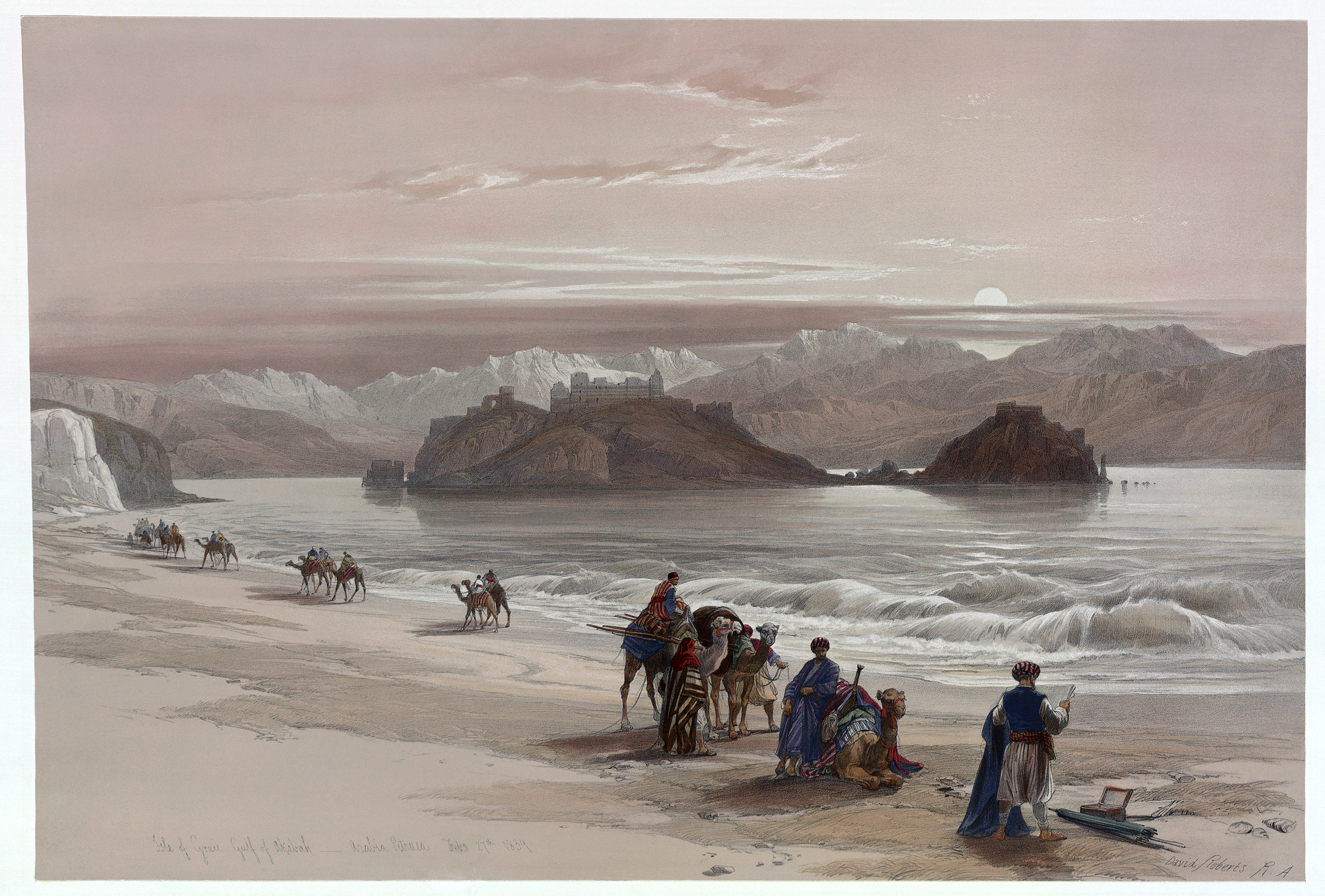
Isle of Graia Gulf of Akabah Arabia Petraea, 1839 lithograph of a trade caravan by Louis Haghe from an original by David Roberts.

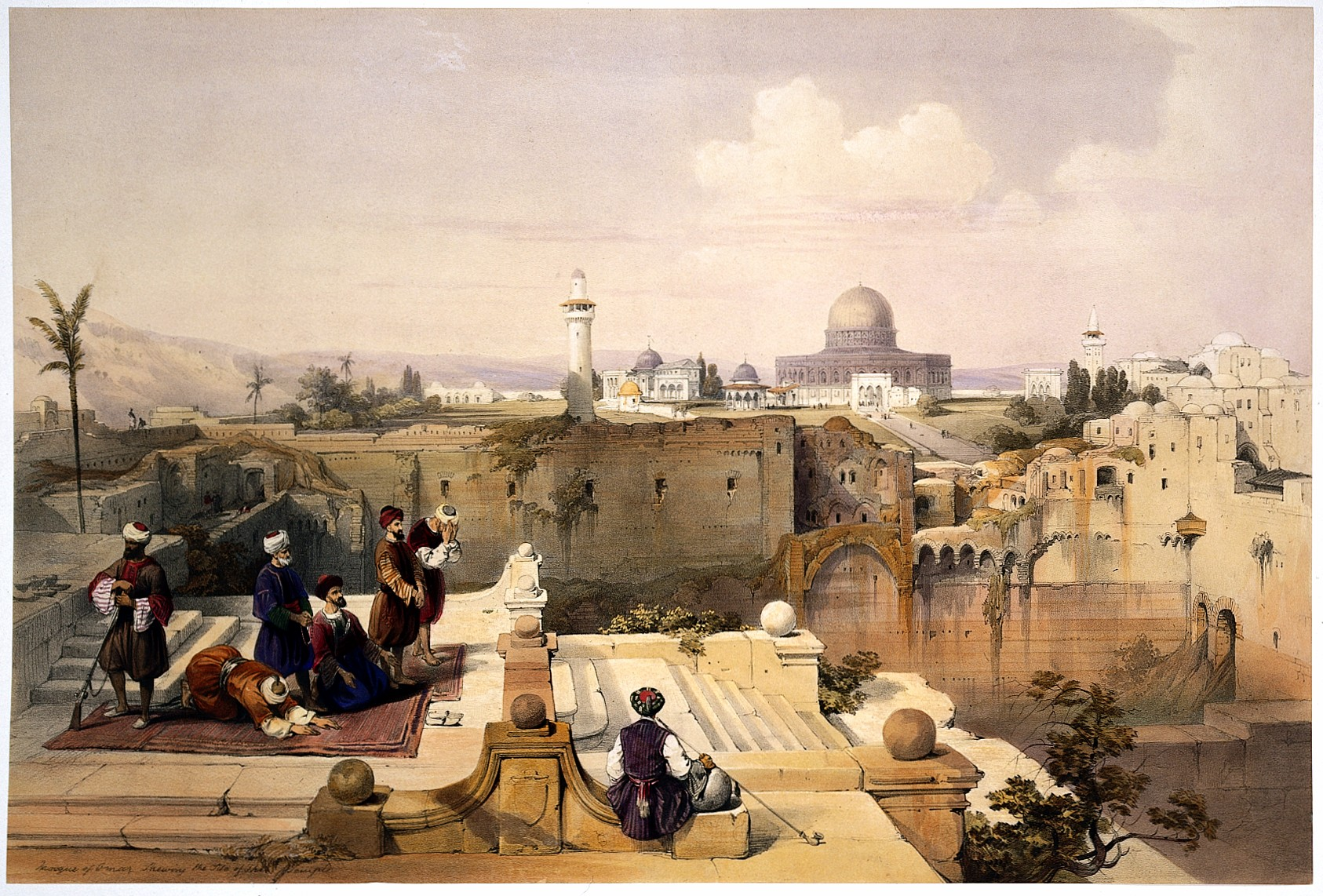
Dome of the Rock in Jerusalem, The Holy Land, Syria, Idumea, Arabia, Egypt, and Nubia by Louis Haghe from an original by David Roberts.
