= James Macaulay (editor) =

Scottish physician writer

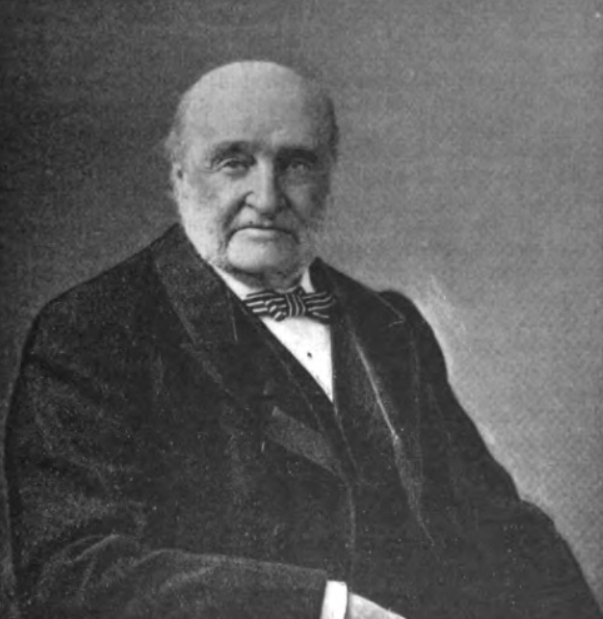
- Born: 1817; Edinburgh
- Died: 1902 (aged 84–85); Kensington
- Occupations: Physician, writer

James Macaulay (22 May 1817 – 18 June 1902) was a Scottish medical man, journalist and author, best known as an anti-vivisectionist and periodical editor.

== Career ==
Born in Edinburgh on 22 May 1817, he was the eldest son of the physician Alexander Macaulay (1783–1868). He was educated at Edinburgh Academy. He then went to Edinburgh University, where after taking the arts course, he took up medicine.

With his fellow-student and lifelong friend Edward Forbes, Macaulay went to Paris in 1837-8, and witnessed François Magendie's experiments on animals; he became an opponent of vivisection. He graduated both M.A. and M.D. at Edinburgh in 1838. He was elected Fellow of the Royal College of Surgeons of Edinburgh on 7 July 1862.

== Editor ==
Macaulay gave up medicine for literature and journalism. Settling in London, he joined the staff of the Literary Gazette in 1850. In 1858 he became editor of two weekly periodicals, The Leisure Hour (founded in 1852) and Sunday at Home (founded in 1854), and held the posts till 1895. Both papers had moral and religious aims, and a circulation among young readers. Macaulay's contributors to The Leisure Hour, who were usually anonymous, included at the outset Richard Whately, and later Frank Buckland, Canon George Rawlinson, and Arminius Vambery. Macaulay was also for many years general editor for the Religious Tract Society. The Boy's Own Paper and the Girl's Own Paper were founded in 1879 and edited under his direction.

== Death ==
Macaulay died at 41 Wynnstay Gardens, Kensington, on 18 June 1902.

== Works ==
Macaulay took interest in animal welfare and opposed vivisection. He published An Essay on Cruelty to Animals (1839). He followed it up in later life with A Plea for Mercy to Animals (1875; new edit. 1889) and Vivisection: Is it Scientifically Useful or Morally Justifiable? (1881).

On leaving university, Macaulay travelled as a tutor in Italy and Spain, and spent some months in Madeira, contributing "Notes on the Physical Geography, Geology and Climate" of the island to the Edinburgh New Philosophical Journal for October 1840. He supplied the letterpress to Madeira, illustrated by Andrew Picken, and edited The Stranger (Funchal), both also published in 1840. In 1871 he travelled through the United States of America, and wrote a series in the Leisure Hour, called "First Impressions of America", which were collected as Across the Ferry (1871; 3rd edit. 1884). A visit to Ireland next year produced Ireland in 1872: a Tour of Observation, with Remarks on Irish Public Opinion (1873; new edit. 1876); he advocated a restricted form of home rule.

Macaulay's publications in later life were mainly juvenile adventure for boys and girls, and anecdotes (of General Gordon, Martin Luther, David Livingstone, George Whitefield, and Oliver Cromwell). He also published:

- What Great Englishmen have said concerning the Papacy, 1878 (reissued as Witness of Great Englishmen, 1900).
- All True: Records of Peril and Adventure by Sea, 1879 (new edit. 1880).
- Sea Pictures drawn with Pen and Pencil, 1882 (new edit. 1884), a work praised by John Ruskin.
- Gray Hawk: Life and Adventures among the Red Indians, 1883 (reissued 1909), a story based on real life.
- Stirring Stories of Peace and War by Land and Sea, 1885 (new edit, illustrated in colour by George Soper, 1910).
- Victoria, R.I.: Her Life and Reign, 1887 (5 portraits).
- From Middy to Admiral of the Fleet: the Story of Commodore Anson retold, 1891.

He also edited Speeches and Addresses of the Prince of Wales (1889).

== Family ==
Macaulay married in 1860 Fanny Stokes, daughter of the Rev. George Stokes, vicar of Hope, Hanley, Staffordshire.

== Notes ==
Attribution

- This article incorporates text from a publication now in the public domain: Lee, Sidney, ed. (1912). "Macaulay, James". Dictionary of National Biography (2nd supplement). Vol. 2. London: Smith, Elder & Co.
