= Andrew Picken =

Scottish novelist

Andrew Picken (1788 – 23 November 1833) was a Scottish novelist, who also wrote under the pseudonym Christopher Keelivine.

== Life ==
Andrew Picken was born in Paisley, Scotland, the son of a rich clothing manufacturer. He was in business in the West Indies and in Glasgow and Liverpool, but not being successful, he went to London to try his fortunes in literature.

Picken married Janet Coxon, daughter of an Edinburgh bookseller. They had four sons, including the lithographers Andrew Picken and Thomas Ashburton Picken.

== Works ==
Tales and Sketches of the West of Scotland (1824), written as Christopher Keelevine, was a series of satirical social sketches. Though popular, this and The Sectarian (1829), gave offence in dissenting circles. The Dominie's Legacy (1830), an autobiographical novel set in Paris, had considerable success, and a book on Travels and Researches of Eminent Missionaries (1830) did something to rehabilitate him with those whom he had offended. Other books included The Club-Book (1831), The Canadas (1832), Traditional Stories of Old Families (1833) and Waltham (1833). His last work, The Black Watch (1833), a novel about the Battle of Fontenoy, had just appeared when he died of a stroke. His work has been compared to that of John Galt, combining social observation and realism.
