= Andrew Picken (lithographer) =

British lithographer

Andrew Picken (1815–1845) was a British draughtsman and lithographer.

== Life ==
Andrew Picken was the second of the four sons of Andrew Picken the novelist, and brother of Thomas Ashburton Picken the lithographer. He became a pupil of Louis Haghe, and in 1835 received from the Society of Arts their silver Isis medal for a lithographic drawing of the ruins of the Houses of Parliament after the fire of 1834. In the same year he exhibited, at the Royal Academy, a view of a tomb in Narbonne Cathedral.

Picken then established himself as a lithographer, and had earned a reputation by the excellent quality of his work when in 1837 his health broke down. His lungs were affected, and he was sent to Madeira. During a residence of two years he drew a series of views of the island, which, on his return to England, were published under the title Madeira Illustrated, 1840, with interesting letterpress edited from his notes by James Macaulay. During his brief career he executed on stone a large number of landscapes, mainly illustrations to books of travel and private commissions.

After a short break Picken found it necessary to revisit Madeira; but his disease was terminal, he came back to London, and he died there on 24 June 1845. He was buried in a family grave on the west side of Highgate Cemetery.

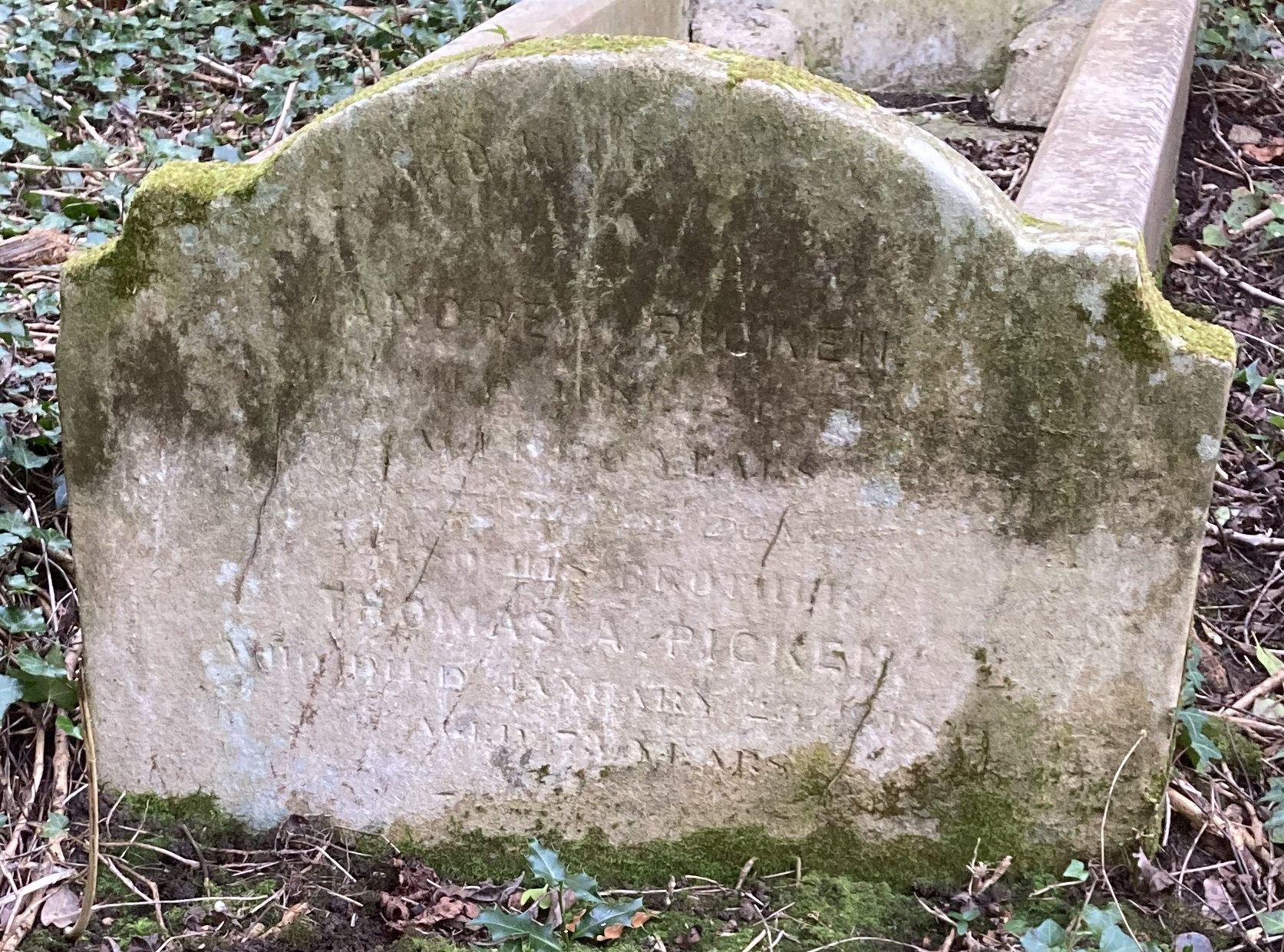
Grave of Andrew Picken in Highgate Cemetery

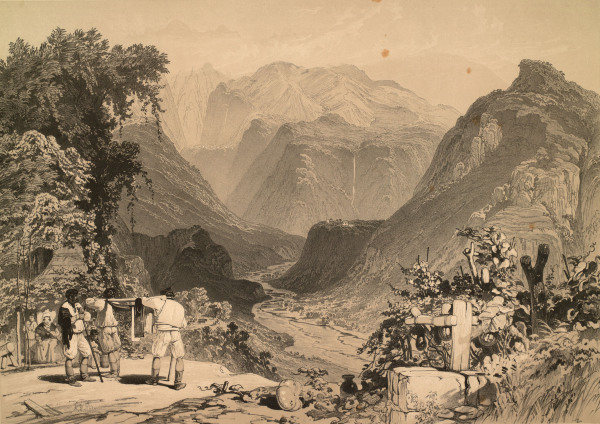
Madeira, Canyon of Sao Jorge, by Andrew Picken
