= John Syer =

English painter

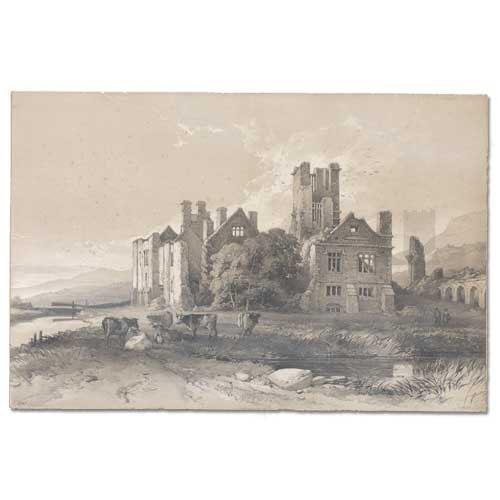
Neath Abbey by John Syer

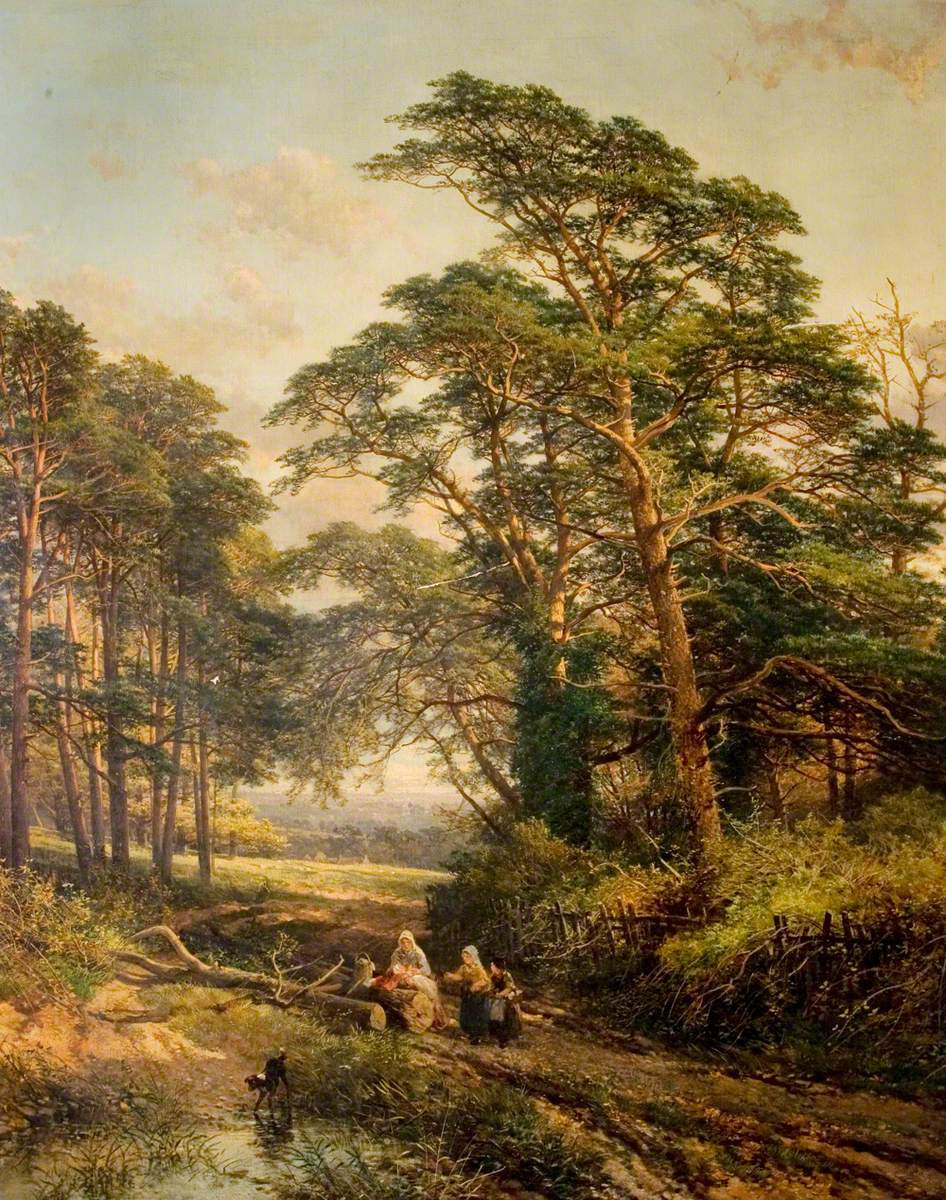
King's Weston Park, near Bristol by John Syer

John Syer (1815–1885) was an English painter. He painted landscape in a style formed chiefly upon that of William Muller, but failed as a colourist.

He exhibited at the Royal Academy, the British Institution, and with the Royal West of England Academy in Bristol, as well as the British Artists, between 1832 and 1875.

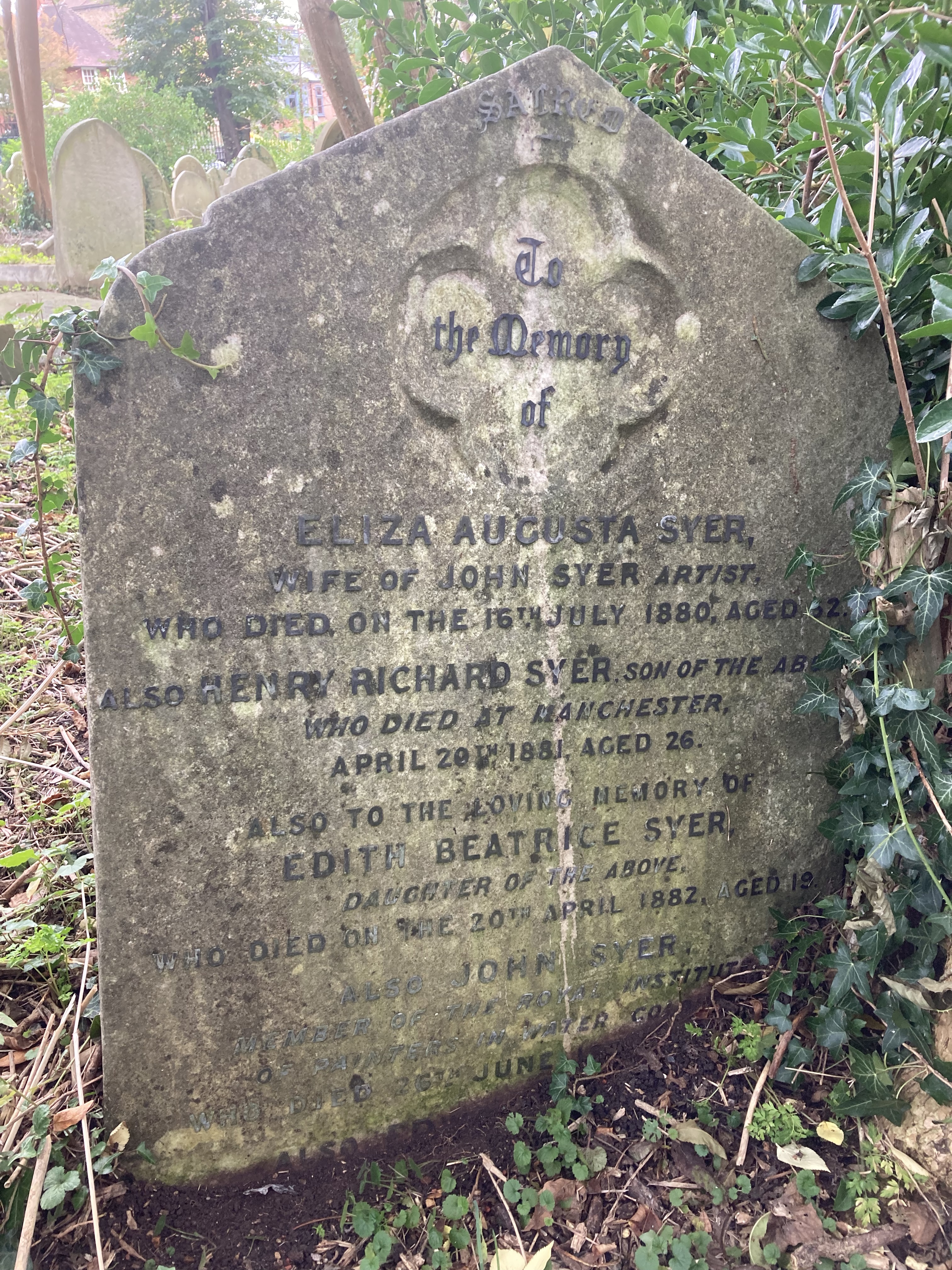
Grave of John Syer in Highgate Cemetery

He died in July, 1885 and was buried in a family grave on the eastern side of Highgate Cemetery in London.
