= Vincent Brooks, Day & Son =

- Type: Private
- Industry: Printing
- Genre: Lithography
- Founded: 1867, London, United Kingdom
- Founder: Vincent Brooks
- Defunct: 1940
- Fate: Wound up/acquired
- Headquarters: London, England

Vincent Brooks, Day & Son was a major British lithographic firm most widely known for reproducing the weekly caricatures published in Vanity Fair magazine. The company was formed in 1867 when Vincent Brooks bought the name, good will and some of the property of Day & Son Ltd, which had gone into liquidation that year. The firm reproduced artwork and illustrations and went on to print many of the iconic London Underground posters of the twenties and thirties before being wound up in 1940.

== Vincent Brooks ==
Company literature holds 1848 as the year that Vincent Robert Alfred Brooks (1815–1885) first set up in business. His father was the radical printer and stationer John Brooks of 421 Oxford Street. John Brooks has been described as the publisher of the Owenites because of his association with the early socialist Robert Owen. He published an edition of Percy Bysshe Shelley's Queen Mab, and was a member of the second council of the National Political Union.

After leaving school, Vincent Brooks spent time on John Minter Morgan's farm estate near Uxbridge before returning to London to join his father in business. Around 1840 John Brooks relocated to the Channel Island of Jersey where he continued to trade as a wholesale stationer and paper merchant. Vincent was left with the business in London. At some time during this period he was also associated with Charles Robertson, an artists' colourman based in Long Acre.

It is not certain at what point Vincent Brooks first practised lithography. A number of his early pieces were shown at the Great Exhibition of 1851. The following year the business moved from Oxford Street to 40 King Street, Covent Garden.

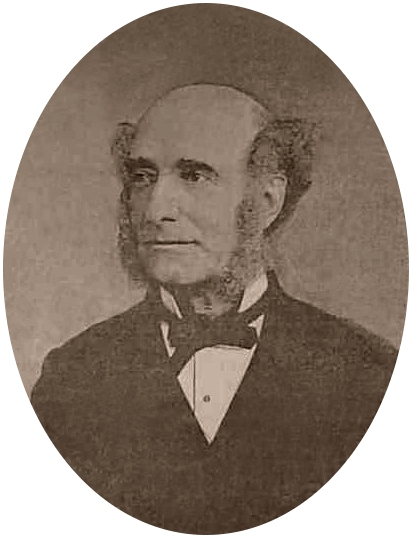
Vincent Brooks

Vincent conducted lithographic classes at Marlborough House during 1855 in what was destined to become the Royal College of Art. He was entrusted with the Princess Royal's Dying Soldier on the Battlefield, which was reproduced and sold in aid of the Patriotic fund. The following year the Arundel Society commissioned a series of lithographs to be issued yearly to their subscribers. An effort described as ‘...the most important non-commercial application of chromolithography' in the country at the time. However, the Arundel Society complained, maybe unjustly, about the quality or the lack of expertise in depicting religious subjects. The prints were also hampered by delays and by 1860 production had been switched to a German firm.

The Leighton Brothers, who would go on to produce the pictures featured in the Illustrated London News, left their Red Lion Square premises in 1857. Vincent Brooks is reported to have taken over the remaining plant.

Staying in the Covent Garden area of London, two years later, during 1859, Vincent Brooks moved to larger premises in Chandos Street. The street is now renamed Chandos Place. Work from this era is marked either as Vincent Brooks Lith. or Vincent Brooks imp.

London's International Exhibition of 1862 saw Vincent Brooks awarded a gold medal for his Lithograph of Mulready's Choosing the Wedding Gown. The same year Vincent Brooks produced one of his finest works in the form of a chromo-lithograph of the Lumley Portrait of William Shakespeare. It is even reported that the reproduction was so complete that one was sold for forty guineas to a purchaser who thought he was buying the original portrait.

During the 1860s, Vincent Brooks acquired plant and premises of Messrs J.S.Hodgson & Son of High Street Lambeth and he embarked in letterpress and colour block printing. The firm also fought off competition from Day & Son and Messrs Hanhart Bros in reproducing one of John Leech's cartoons of Jorrocks in a competition organised by Punch Magazine. The company's winning entry was reproduced by one of their leading chromo-lithographic artists, William B. Bunney, and the firm's success led to many years of work from Punch.

In 1865 Vincent Brooks became involved with the 'inventor' of colour printing George Baxter. He purchased many of Baxter's plates and printed them using Baxter's presses which he had lent him on the understanding that George Baxter Jr. took up the management of them and that George Baxter himself supervised the work. It was a complex process that required up to 20 blocks per image. The process failed to pay its way and Brooks sold the plant four years later to Abraham Le Blond.

1866 saw Vincent Brooks joined in business by his second eldest son Frederick Vincent Brooks who was to eventually take over after his father's death. Vincent's eldest son Alfred William Brooks had preceded his younger brother into the firm but 'never had very robust health' and by 1901 had left the business. Later that year the firm purchased William Willis’ remarkable Aniline process of direct photography, which reproduced engineering 'blue prints' keeping the original positive image.

At Paris's Exposition Universelle, held during 1867, Vincent Brooks won a gold medal for 'the excellence of their reproductions'.

Vincent Brooks had started negotiating to take over the business of Day & Son Ltd during 1866. Financially assisted by the Henry Graves, the Printseller of Pall Mall, Vincent Brooks bought their property, name, and goodwill in an agreement dated 25 March 1867. The firm now became known as Vincent Brooks, Day & Son.

== Day & Son ==
The firm of William Day, later Day & Son, has been described as one of the largest and most prominent lithographic firms of the second third of the nineteenth century. Company documents record William Day's business starting in 1823 although the first known lithograph was produced the following year. By 1829 the firm had moved from 59 Great Queen Street to 17 Gate Street.

From the early thirties the company was often referred to as Day & Haghe. This was due to the popularity of the work of Louis Haghe a Belgian draughtsman and water colourist who worked for the company until 1852 when he left to focus on painting.

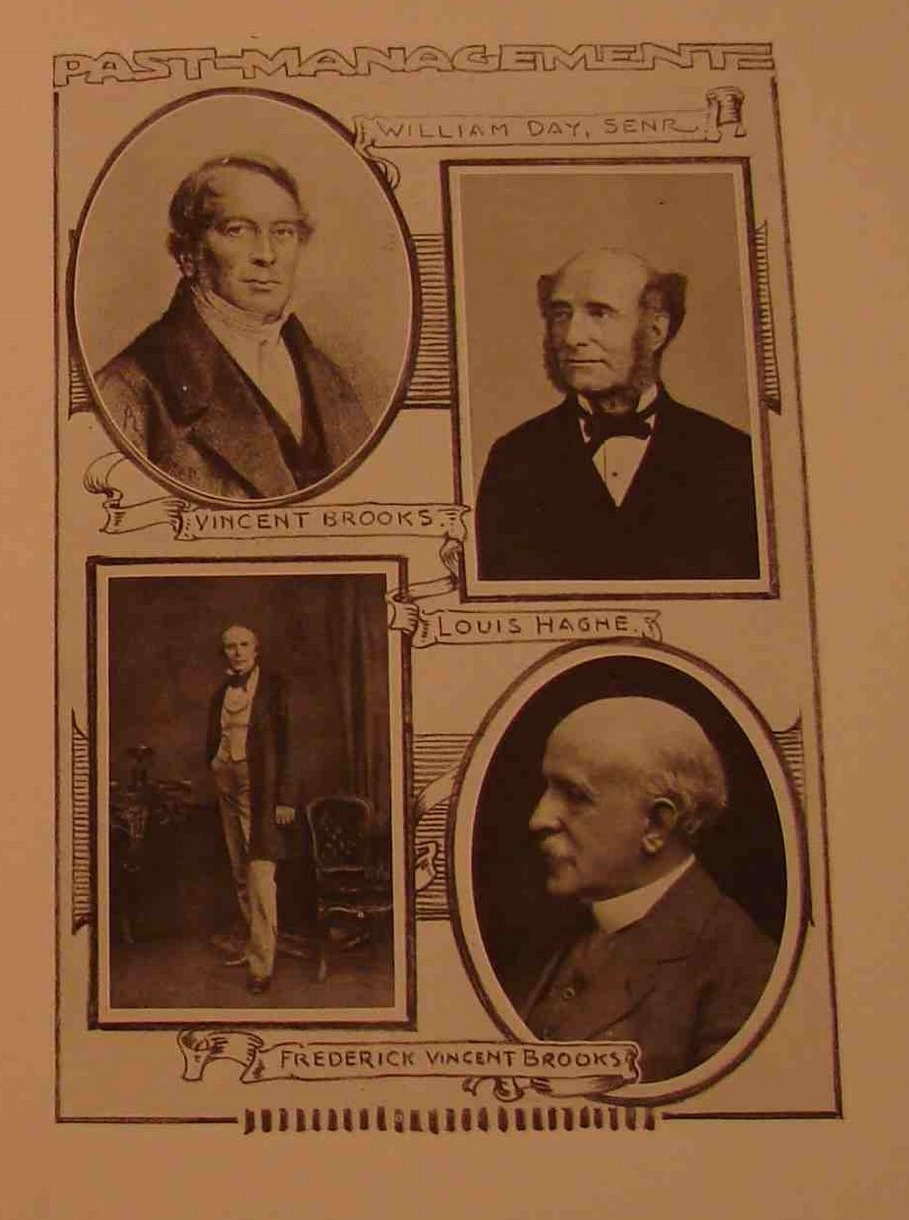
Taken from the 1923 Centenary Programme; an illustration showing the firm's past management.

The firm was granted the status of 'Lithographers to Queen Victoria and to the Queen Dowager, Queen Adelaide' in 1837 although they were not the only lithographers to be awarded the Royal Warrant. William Day Senior died in 1845 leaving the business in the hands of his son William Day Junior. The company now became known as Day & Son.

The 1850s started with a prize medal at the Great Exhibition for their display of lithography. In the mid fifties the premises in Gate Street were enlarged and the Prince of Wales and Prince Alfred visited (probably the completed works) in 1856.

In 1851, Day & Son was commissioned by Matthew Digby Wyatt, known for his work as an architect, to produce the book The Industrial Arts of the Nineteenth Century, an imposing imperial folio in two volumes which illustrates a selection of items from the Great Exhibition of 1851. There are 160 chromolithographed plates. Wyatt himself stated that he had used 'the best means of graphic representation available'. Wyatt proudly drew attention to the previously unsurpassed scale and speed of production of the book. But what brought the entire project into being was the desire of Day & Son to demonstrate the potential of chromolithography. The firm was particularly associated with the process. However, as Wyatt himself explained, the proposal was not even formalized until after the Great Exhibition had opened. Such a grandiose production must have called into play a significant proportion of Day's resources, including skilled craftsmen and lithographers such as Francis Bedford, J.A. Vinter and Henry Rafter, as well as significant capital, and management. According to Wyatt, four or five of Day's staff were constantly engaged upon the business details of the operation alone.

In 1861 the firm printed a large run of bank notes for Lajos Kossuth, the famous Hungarian patriot and democratic. Kossuth was in exile from his homeland and this attempt at re-establishing a separate Hungarian currency lead to both him and Day & Son to be charged in the courts with having 'levied war upon the Emperor of Austria'. The affair ended with Day & Son delivering the notes to the Bank of England where they were duly burnt.

The firm now started to experience financial difficulties. Many stock auctions were held, the first, of engravings, taking place in 1865. That year Day & Son became a Limited Company. This not only meant that capital could be raised by the sale of shares but also that, in some cases, employees could be paid partly in shares in lieu of real wages. Another auction, this time of illustrated books, was held in 1866. Hodgson & Co. would continue to sell off Day & Son assets up until 1873.

Despite their other business worries by 1866 Day & Son Ltd, as well as Gate Street, had premises at 43 Piccadilly and at The German Gallery, New Bond Street. These were show rooms and exhibition spaces for the company's work. They also took on the well-known photographer Vernon Heath to manage the photographic department.

Since becoming a limited company, directorship was conditional on holding at least five hundred shares. Just two years after incorporation it was pointed out to William Day Junior that he no longer fulfilled this criterion. He refused to leave the board and after the resulting row he left the company and for a short time started business in Cockspur Street.

The firm now faced liquidation and was taken over by Vincent Brooks.

== Vincent Brooks, Day & Son ==
Vincent Brooks now consolidated the new combined business in Day & Son's Gate Street premises. A later obituary published in a trade journal praises Vincent Brooks's handling of the situation stating that "the way in which he combined together the two businesses testified to his energy and experience, and the way in which they formed a harmonious whole, were a record of his remarkable tact and kindness."

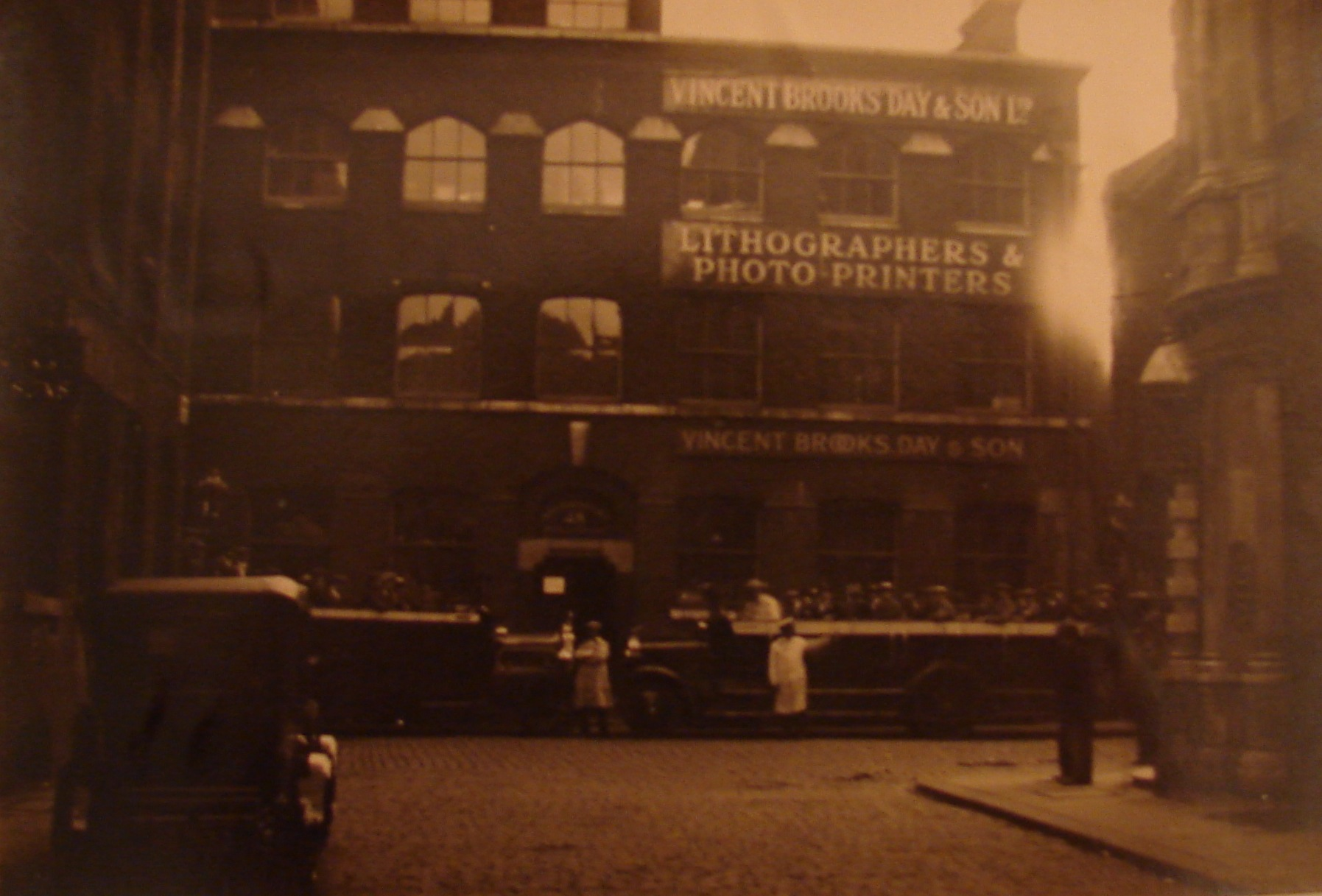
Employees of Vincent Brooks, Day & Son prepare to depart from Parker Street on a works outing.

A year after the merger, 1868, Gibson Bowles began planning his new Vanity Fair magazine. His new brand of society weekly was to carry satirical caricatures of the men of the day lithographed by Vincent Brooks. At a time when Punch magazine was still primarily using wood blocks this 'process of chromolithography and wedding it to a new kind of visual humour helped to bring about a revolution in taste, preparing the way for the acceptance of less strictly representational art forms and breaching the fortifications of academic realism.' The first issue to carry a cartoon came out in January 1869 featuring a portrait of Benjamin Disraeli. Later the magazine would claim that,

Vincent Brooks...was a pioneering lithographer on whose expertise Bowles built Vanity Fair.

Back in Chandos Street the firm had received a Command from the Queen to execute lithographs of Kenneth MacLeay's watercoloured Highlanders of Scotland. These featured the principle clans and the retainers of the Royal Household at Balmoral and are known as the artist's best works. By 1870 the originals had appeared at an exhibition at Mitchell's Royal Library in Old Bond Street with the lithographs being sold in two volumes later that year.

By the 1870s the firm was employing over one hundred and forty men and forty boys and in 1885 acquired the remaining part of Leighton bros.

On 29 September 1885 Vincent Brooks died in Spalding & Hodge Counting House, Drury Lane. He was succeeded in the business by his son Frederick Vincent Brooks (1848–1921).

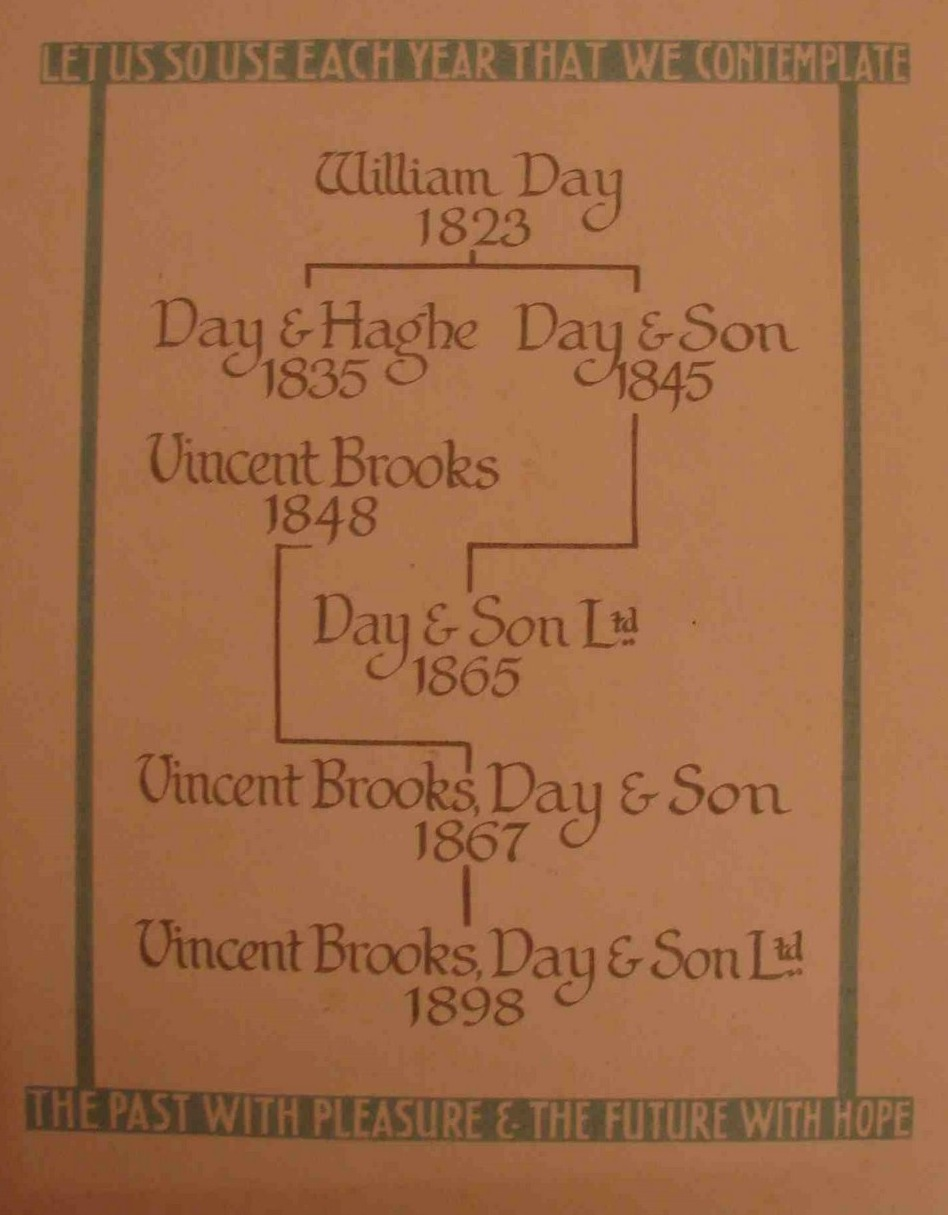
Taken from the 1923 Centenary Programme; a diagram showing the firm's history.

Frederick and his older brother Alfred appeared in the bankruptcy courts in 1898 and on 14 May that year the company was incorporated as Vincent Brooks, Day & Son Ltd. During this time the firm's premises in Gate Street were badly damaged by fire. It started around ten o'clock in the evening of Sunday 10 April and quickly spread through the buildings. It is reported that 'the whole of the main building, containing about 40 printing machines and a great quantity of type, had been entirely destroyed'. As a result, the run of Vanity Fair prints temporarily switched to colour offsets produced by P.W. Van De Weyer over in the Netherlands and the firm moved to a new home in Parker Street just a couple of minutes walk west of Gate Street.

From January 1906 Vanity Fair used a number of other (probably cheaper) firms to produce their caricatures. This decision was reversed in 1911 with the arrival of editor Thomas Allinson who, struggling with the now failing magazine, wished to revert to the process whereby 'the most satisfactory results' had been obtained. Vanity Fair magazine finally ceased publication in 1914. Its forty-five-year run of caricatures ended as Allinson absorbed it into his Hearth and Home magazine.

The start of the century also saw Frederick Vincent Brooks write an article for the 1911 Encyclopædia Britannica and become the official printer of the Senefelder Club.

Frederick died on 7 August 1921 and the business passed to two of his sons, Wilfred Vincent Brooks and Frederick Allan Brooks. Two years later the firm celebrated their centenary. Wilfred remarked that 'although there were older firms in existence that were now practising lithography, no other house had been established as lithographic printers for so long a period as theirs.' During the evening's celebration it was also announced that a former apprentice Thomas Edgar Griffits had been co-opted onto the firm's board of directors.

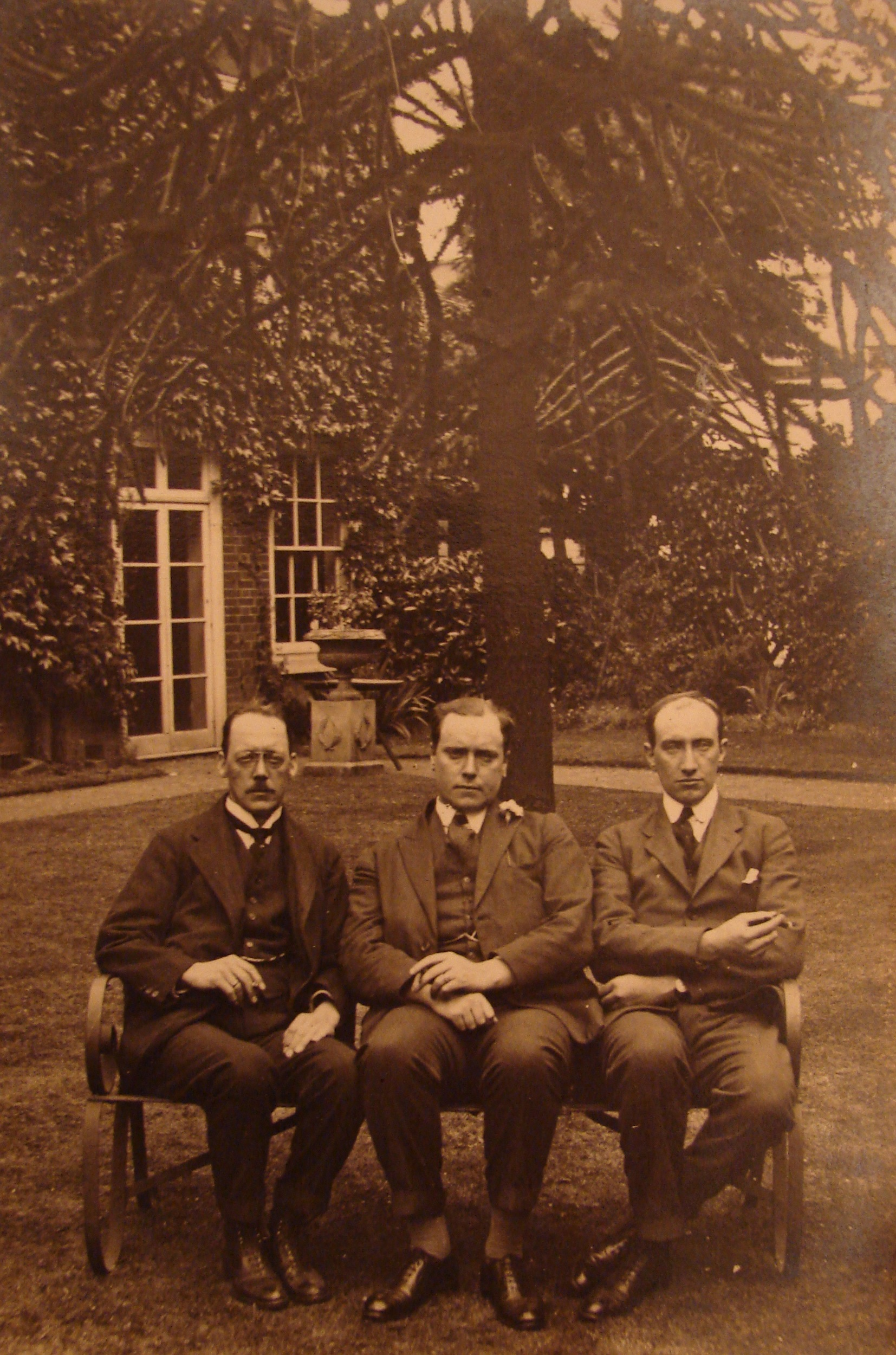
The directors of Vincent Brooks, Day & Son Ltd in the late 1920s. Right to left; Frederick Allan Brooks, Wilfred Vincent Brooks and Thomas Edgar Griffits.

During the twenties and thirties the art of the poster reached its pinnacle. Under the guidance of Frank Pick, the London Underground embraced the likes of John Hassall and Edward McKnight Kauffer. Artists were directly commissioned and it was believed that the influence of good design could extend to enrich every aspect of life. This was a common theme during the thirties. Wilfred Vincent Brooks served as chairman of the Commercial Printing Section of the Royal Academy of Art's exhibition 'British Art in Industry' held during 1935. He expressed his own sentiments in a speech soon after,

The day, I hope, will come when quality and quantity will come together in happy alliance and the most ordinary commodities will benefit in form as well as in substance. Ugliness is at all times and in all places to be vigorously rejected; it is a coarsening and debasing influence, a clear sign of deterioration in a nations life. Since the products of industry are so widespread amongst the people, there influence for a good or evil condition of taste is immense. Hence the conquest of ugliness is of even greater moment in industry than elsewhere.

During this period Wilfred was 'a valuable member of the Colour Lithography Committee of the London Master Printers' Association and was also a member of the London Central Districts Master Printers' Association.' He was chairman of the Education Committee and member of the Advisory Sub-committee, with the London County Council School of Photo-Engraving and Lithography in Bolt Street, Fleet Street, and was an inspector of the London printing schools for the Board of Education.

It was later reported that business had been continuing with 'fluctuating results up until 1919 and then had had a general upward trend in turnover. Dividends at the rate of 10% per annum were paid for each of the eight years to 1927. Dividends for the four following years were lower and no dividends were paid after 1931. From 1932 to 1940 profits were earned in only two years namely, 1937 and 1938. In an effort to raise funds the lease on the premises was sold in 1939 but this did little to bring in new business which had been affected by the start of World War Two. Finally a creditor petitioned the Companies Court and a Winding-up Order was made on 5 February 1940.

The official Receiver concluded his report stating that 'the Receiver for the debenture holder is continuing the business in the hopes of disposing of it as a going concern, but he states that having regard to the specialised and somewhat ancient type of plant he doubts whether the assets will realise sufficient to discharge the debenture liability, particularly bearing in mind the somewhat heavy claims of the preferential creditors.'

== Sanders Phillips and Co. ==
Sanders Phillips and Co. Ltd took over the company in the same year. Nine months later the Parker Street premises were destroyed by fire during an air raid, but the company, operating from London offices in Norfolk Street, Strand, son established Government contracts for reproducing maps for Bomber Command, plans for M.I.8, and, after 'D' Day, 'communication maps' which were collected by the R.A.F. and flown direct to France.

When these contracts ran out at the end of the war, it was decided to specialise in the reproduction of town and country planning maps. Typical of this work was a new series of land utilisation maps for King's College Geographic Department, which were produced in 11 colours. Later examples include motorways and transport maps for the Greater London Council.

Sanders Phillips and Co became a part of the International Publishing Corporation (IPC) in 1963 operating as a subsidiary of the parent company. The IPC were in turn acquired by the Reed Group in 1969 who created Reed International plc to control its UK subsidiaries.

In 1976 Reed International sold off Vincent Brooks, Day & Son to the firms chief draughtsman Sidney Reed. Up until his retirement in the 1990s Sidney Reed continued to run the company on a small-scale basis using outside printers, notably Round Square Ltd, to produce the work he had created. Round Square Ltd took ownership of Vincent Brooks, Day & Son after Sidney Reed's retirement but went into liquidation themselves some time prior to 1999.

Ten years after this Sidney Reed's son Barry revived the company name and, although not currently trading, is keeping alive the name of the company that his father dedicated virtually his whole working life to.
