= Frances Emilia Crofton =

19th-century Anglo-Irish landscape painter

- Born: Frances Emilia Dunn; 1822; Waterford, Ireland
- Died: 23 October 1910 (aged 88); Dunmore, County Waterford, Ireland
- Notable work: Eight Views (1854), a bound collection of eight lithographs after paintings by Crofton
- Style: Picturesque
- Spouse: William Crofton (1813–1886) RN MD JP

Frances Emilia Crofton née Dunn (1822 – 23 October 1910), known professionally as Mrs William Crofton, was an Anglo-Irish landscape painter of the picturesque style who flourished in the mid-19th century. In 1854 she published Eight Views, a folio edition of lithograph prints of her original landscape paintings of Britain and Ireland, to be sold for charitable purposes. These sets of eight prints were purchased by various bishops, members of the aristocracy and others, and some are now in public collections. She married Anglo-Irish landowner William Crofton, a naval surgeon and justice of the peace, and lived for the rest of her life in Cheltenham, Gloucestershire and at Lakefield, a mansion with a large estate in County Leitrim, Ireland.

== Background ==
Frances Emilia Dunn (Waterford 1822 – Dunmore 23 October 1910), was known to her family as Fanny. She was the daughter of Nicholas James Cuthbert Dunn RN (1785–1858) (Note: NJC Dunn, father of Frances Emilia, was born in France (1851 Census) and was buried in Cheltenham new burial ground on 6 March 1858 (Gloucestershire Church of England burials 1858, p.132).) and his wife Frances Elizabeth (1794–1872). Two of her brothers, Montagu Buccleugh and William James, were Naval lieutenants. On 30 March 1848 she married William Crofton (1813 – 23 May 1886), RN, MD, JP, at St Mary's Church, Pembroke. He had been an assistant surgeon on HMS Royal Adelaide, and was the second son of Duke Crofton, JP, DL. When her husband died in 1886, he left over £20,000 (equivalent to £2,247,547.74 in 2025), including the couple's houses and contents at Lakefield and Cheltenham, and the Lakefield estate.

Crofton married into the politically complex situation of Anglo-Irish sectarianism. In 1902, at the time of the accession of Edward VII, she presided over the "enthusiastic" celebrations organised for her family's estate workers at Lakefield in Ireland, and was congratulated for that. On the same occasion her nephew, Captain Duke Crofton, proposed a toast to the health of the new king, but "in doing so referred to the offensive terms of the Coronation Oath to His Majesty's Catholic subjects". Half a century before that, she had published a volume of pictures in aid of a charity whose intention was to "preserve the Protestantism of the orphans of mixed marriages". (Note: "Mixed marriages" in this case refers to 19th-century Protestant-Catholic marriages in Ireland)

In Cheltenham Crofton supported charities for the poor. In 1870 she was a patron of amateur concerts in aid of the Female Orphan Asylum and the Local Poor, in Cheltenham.

When young, Crofton was described by the Wexford Independent newspaper as "amiable and accomplished". In her old age the Leitrim Advertiser said she was "venerable and highly respected".

=== Homes in England and Ireland ===
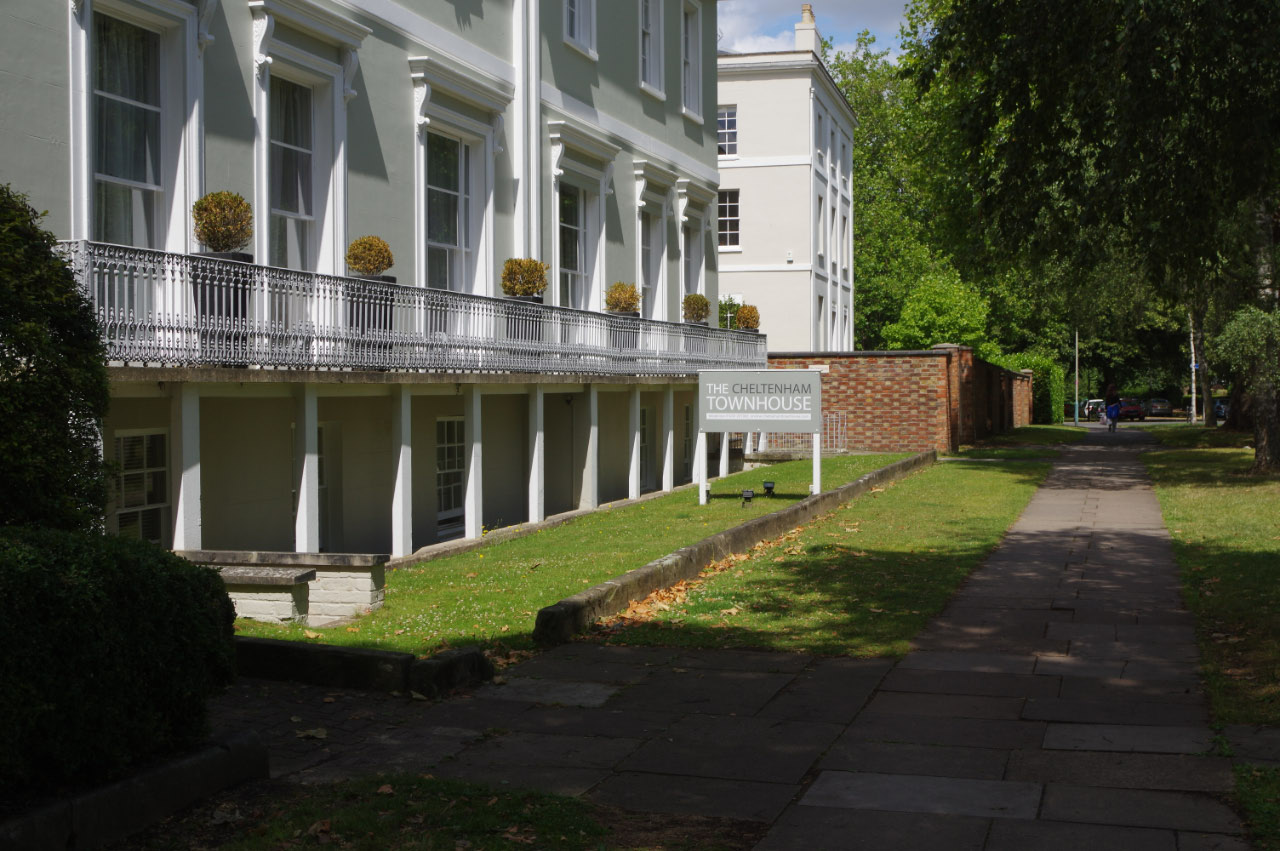
Crofton's Cheltenham address

Crofton and her husband lived in both Britain and Ireland, travelling regularly between the two. In England they lived at Montagu Villa, 1 Clarendon Villas, Cheltenham, Gloucestershire, (Note: "Montagu" was the contemporary spelling. The later spelling was "Montague". The address has now been re-named as 6 Pittville Lawn.) where Frances Emilia Crofton's parents lived between 1849 and 1860, and Frances and William Crofton lived between 1862 and 1910. Frances and William Crofton's Irish home was Lakefield, a mansion with an estate in Mohill, County Leitrim, Ireland. The house was built between 1791 and 1798, and its lands were part of the Crofton Mohill estate. The Crofton family owned it until 1931 when it was sold to the Irish Land Commission, after which it became a ruin.

== Artwork ==
Crofton's professional name was Mrs William Crofton. She is known for a single work only: a set of lithograph copies of her own original landscape paintings of Britain and Ireland. The whereabouts of her original paintings is unknown. In 1855, she donated £51 (equivalent to £5,935.93 in 2025) to the County Leitrim Protestant Orphan Society. This was the proceeds of the sale of "eight views taken by that lady": a subscriber edition of bound volumes containing a set of eight lithographs after landscape pictures by Crofton. A Dublin bookseller Penelope Gibson has said, "The plates are in striking detail showing scenery chiefly of the Irish country side, castles, abbeys and ruins".

=== Commentary on the style of the Eight Views (1854) ===
Although beautiful, the style of the Eight Views might have appeared to be fifty years out of date by 1854. The subscribers' list suggests that by the age of 32 years Crofton possessed a strong group of Protestant Establishment contacts. The list includes the bishops of St Asaph, Cashel and Waterford, Killaloe, Peterborough, Ripon, Winchester and other clergy, titled personages and military officers, besides members of the middle classes. (Note: For the subscriber list for Eight Views, see File:Frances Emilia Crofton subscriber list.jpg and File:Frances Emilia Crofton subscriber list 2.jpg.) It follows that the accepted and morally-uplifting artistic style previously promoted by the Royal Academy would be appropriate to gain and hold the support of such a group. If the Eight Views of 1854 are representative of Crofton's preferred style, then it is possible that she and perhaps her subscribers might have favoured the older picturesque and repoussoir style of painted landscapes as a matter of taste.

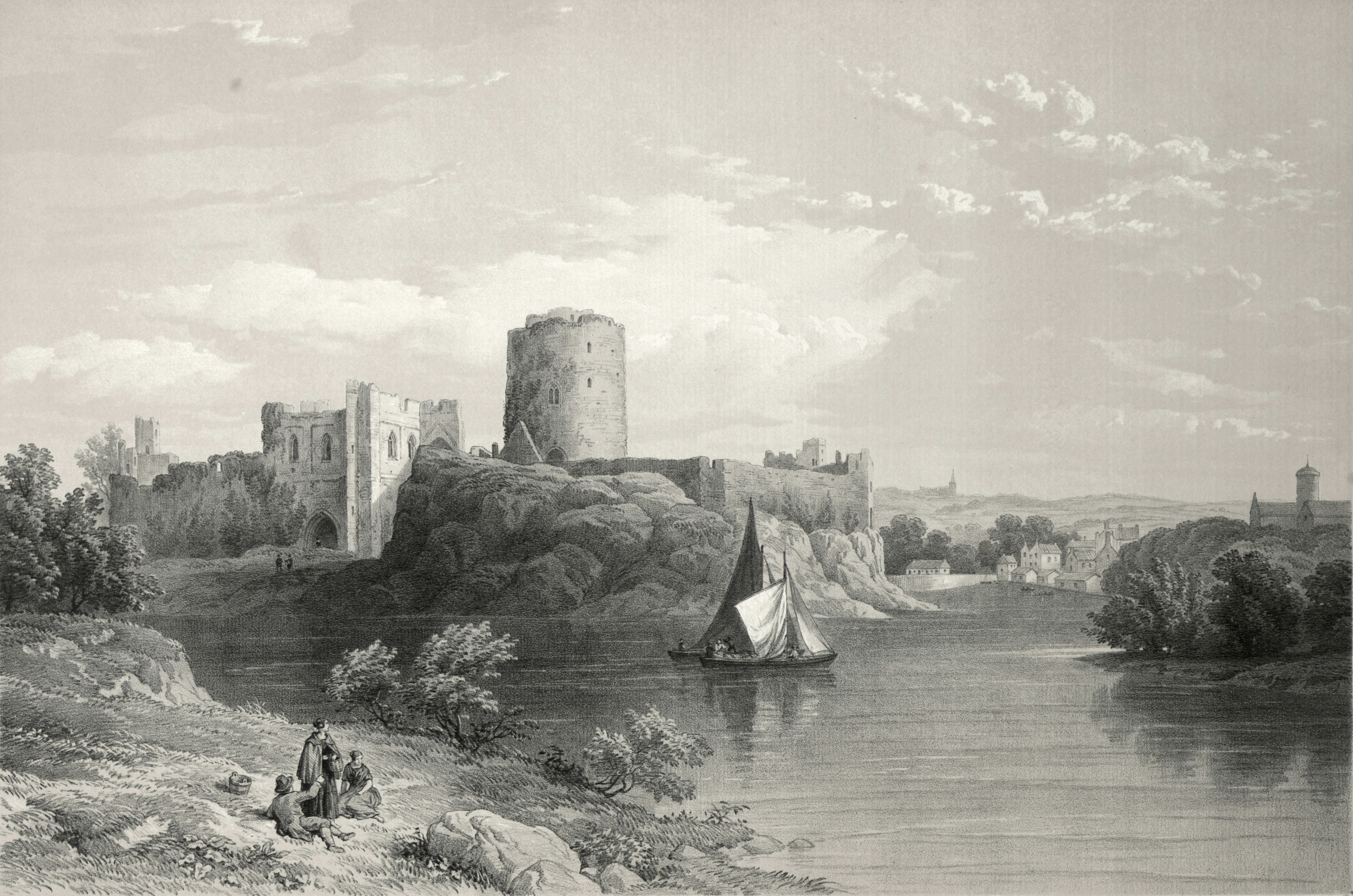
The picturesque Pembroke Castle, South Wales, 1854, with Romantic ruins

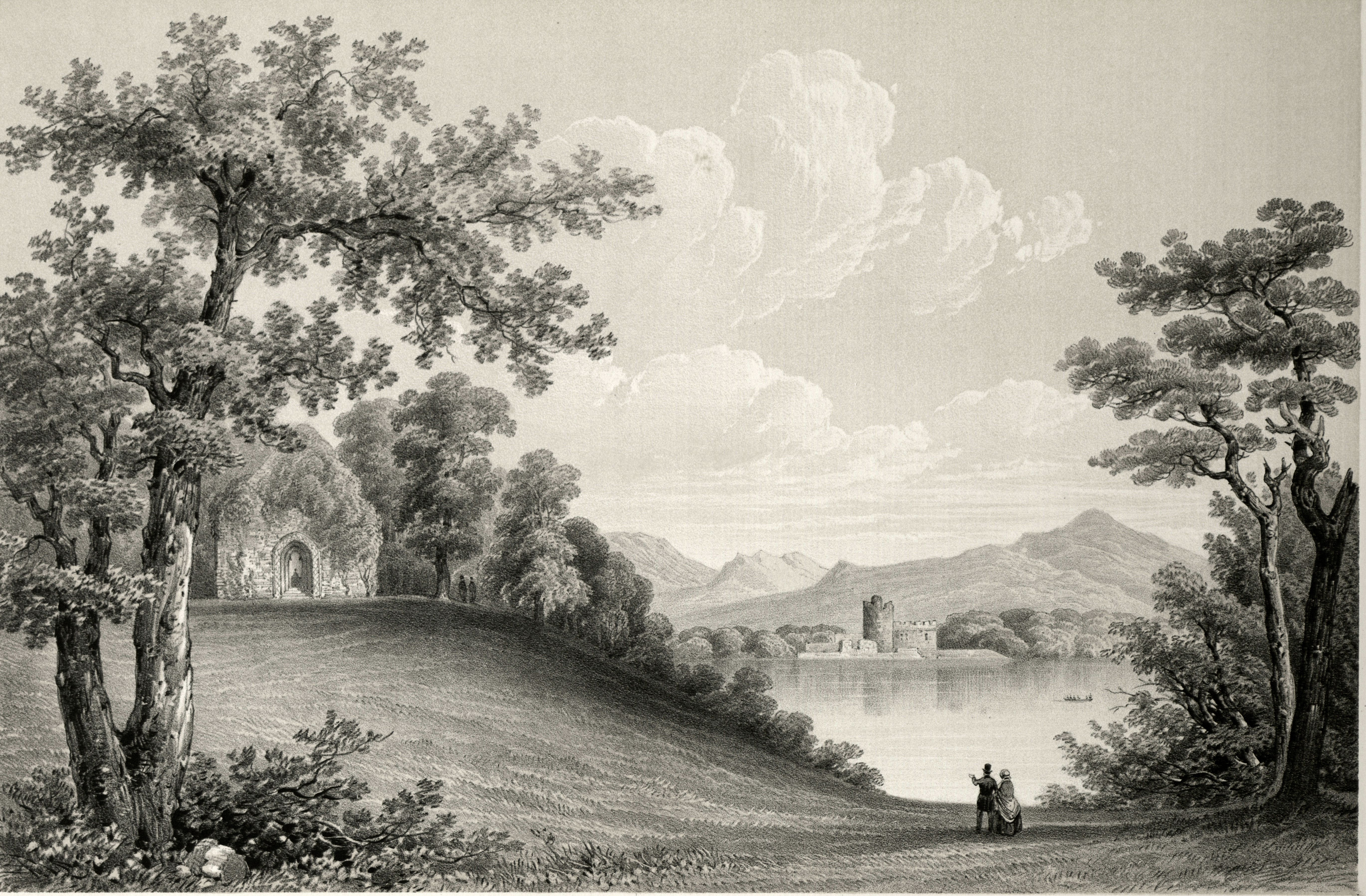
The repoussoir Monastery of Innisfallen Island, 1954, with framed perspective

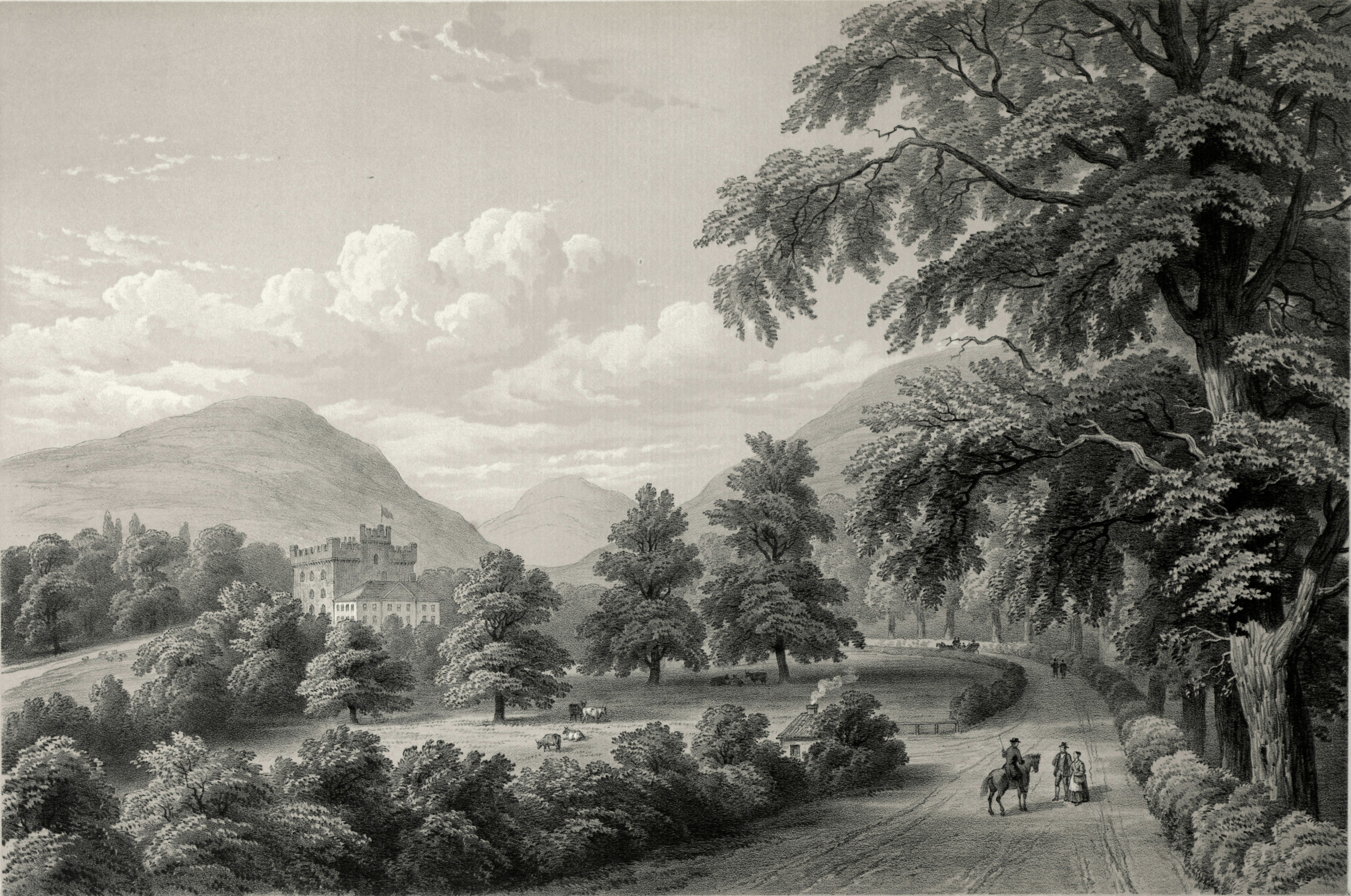
The sublime Castle Otway, County Tipperary, 1854, where the castle is dwarfed by Nature

== Publication ==
- Crofton, Mrs William (1854). Eight views, for the benefit of the County Leitrim protestant orphan society from the original drawing. Ackerman. The eight engravings were lithograph copies of Crofton's original paintings. Some editions were bound in olive green cloth with gold motif. The untinted lithographs were by Thomas Ashburton Picken (1818–1891), and some tinted lithographs were by William Louis Walton (1808-1879). It was produced in folio or quarto size.
- I View from Clooncaher of Lough Rynn and Lakefield, County Leitrim (1854).
- II Ruins of Muckruss Abbey (1854).
- III Monastery on Innisfallen Island, and Ross Castle, Killarney (1854).
- IV Castle Otway, County Tipperary, residence of Captain Otway, RN (1854).
- V Dunbrody Abbey, County Wexford (1854).
- VI Pembroke Castle, South Wales (1854).
- VII Isle of Portland, Dorsetshire (1854).
- VIII Village of Hambledon, Hants (1854).

=== Details from three views ===
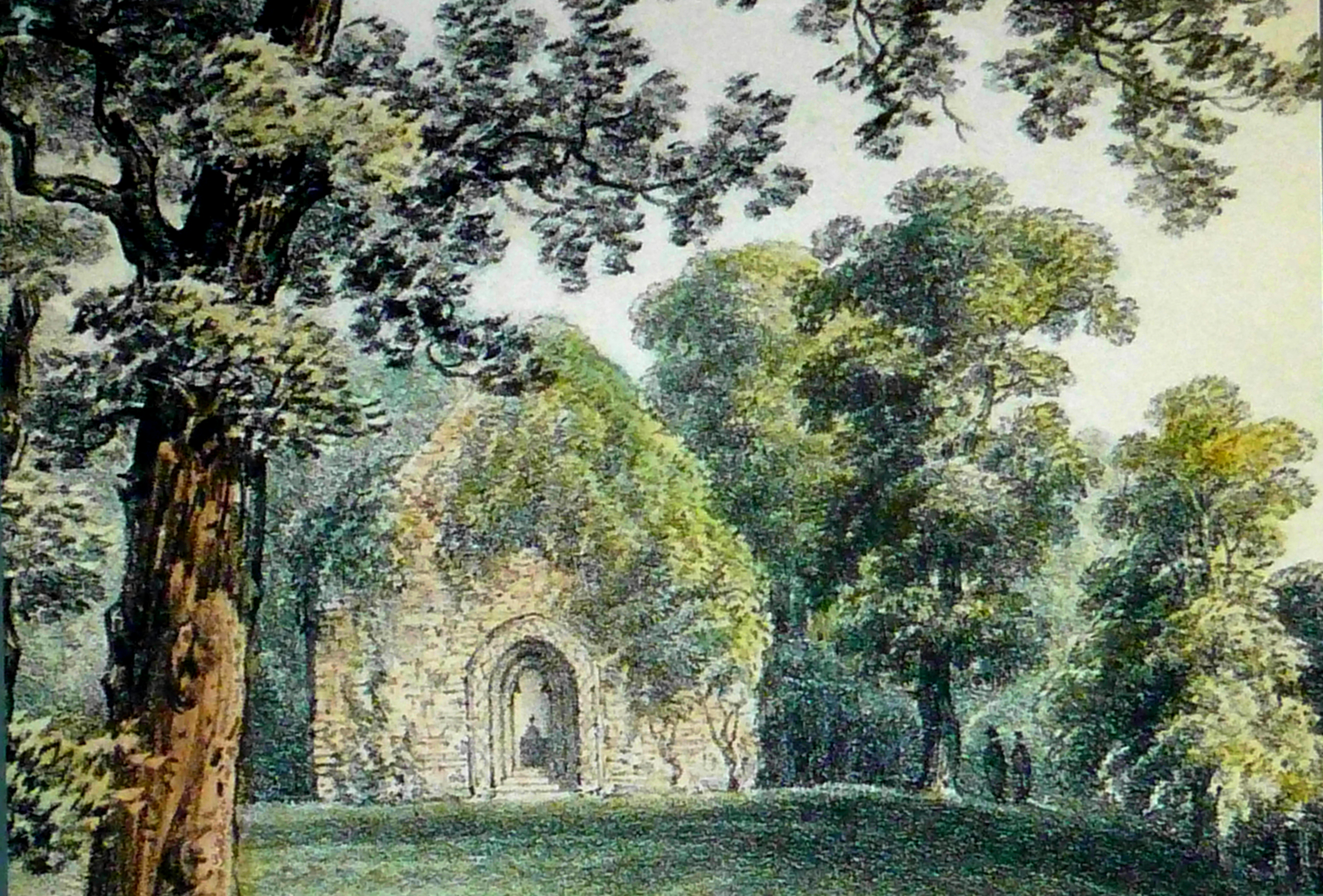
From III, showing Innisfallen Abbey

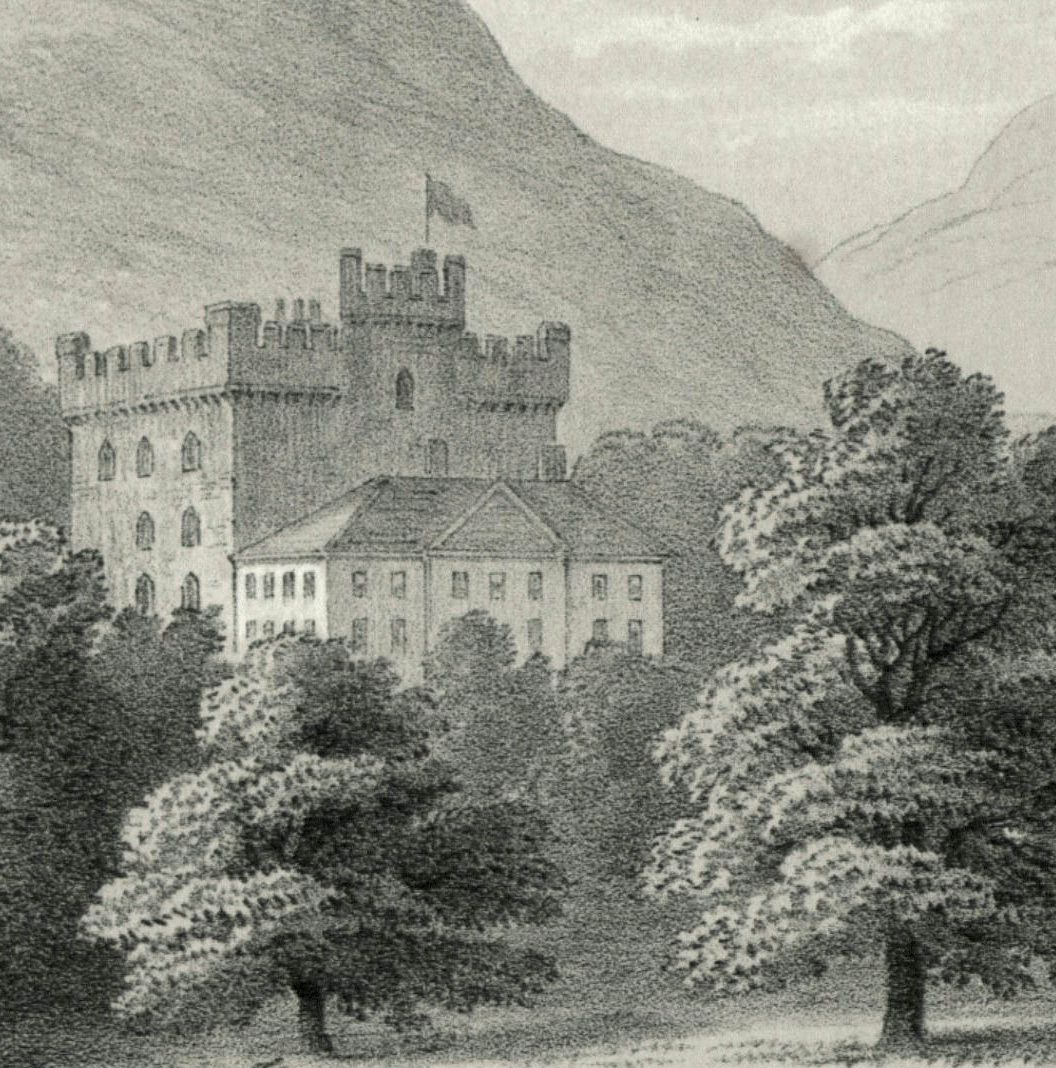
From IV, showing Castle Otway

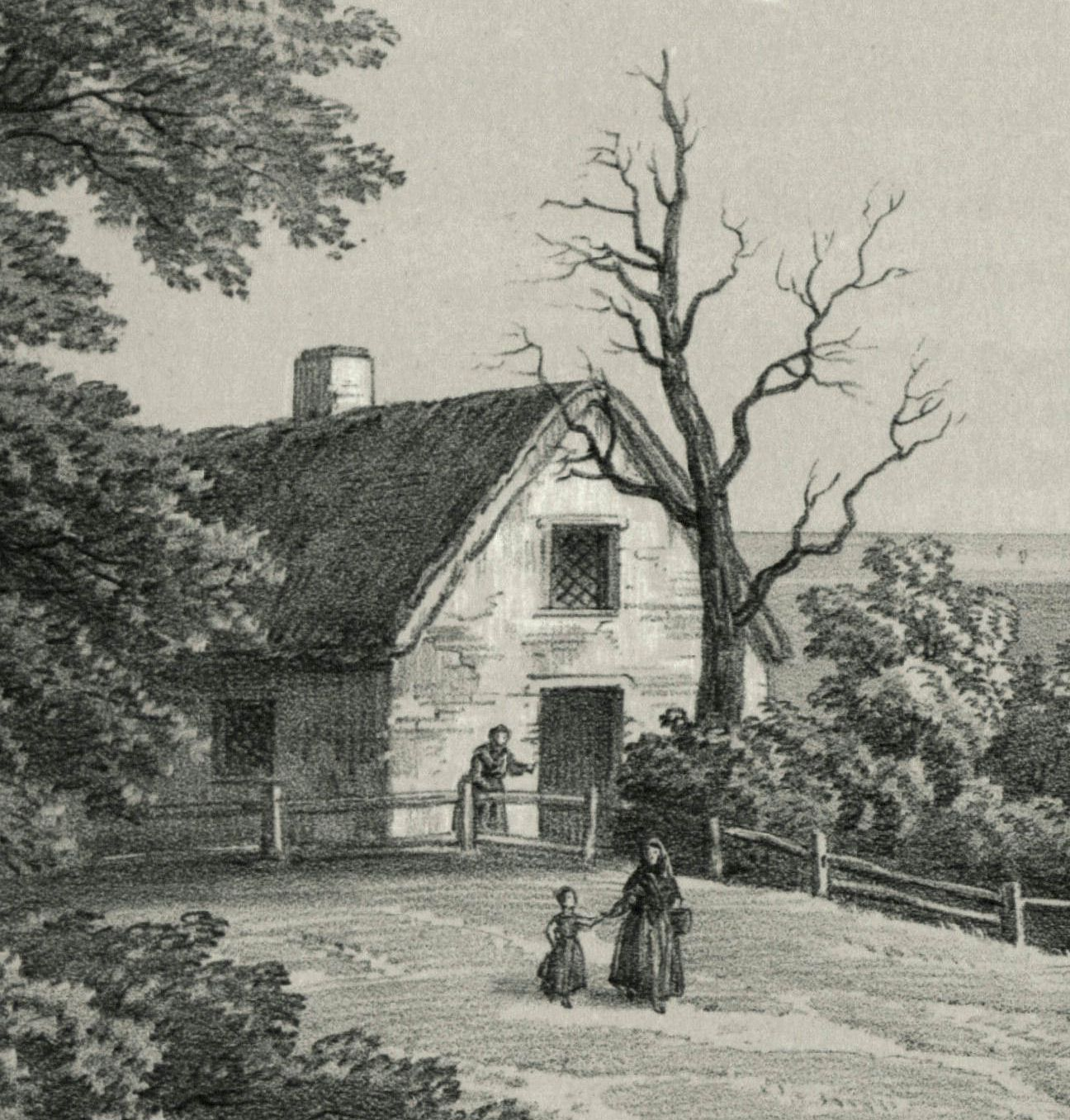
From VII, showing Isle of Portland

== Collections ==
- Royal Collection Trust: Five of the prints including Killarney, Dunbroody Abbey, Lough Rynn, Muckruss Abbey and Castle Otway.
- Falvey Memorial Library, Villanova University, Pennsylvania: Eight views for the benefit of the County Leitrim Protestant Orphan Society: 8 tinted lithographs of folio size 450 x 320mm, after original drawings by Mrs William Crofton. The list of plates has a wood-engraved border.
- The People's Collection, Haverfordwest Library: Pembroke Castle, South Wales
- National Library of Wales: Pembroke Castle, South Wales.
- National Library of Ireland: Monastery on Innisfallen Island and Ross Castle, Killarney.
- Marquess Conyngham collection, Slane Castle (until 1980): Bound volume, Eight Views. (Note: Francis Conyngham, 2nd Marquess Conyngham was a subscriber to Eight Views, and the volume was kept in Slane Castle collection until 1980, when the castle's collection was sold by the 8th marquess Henry Mountcharles)

== Crofton in culture ==
- Leverson, Ada (12 December 2019). The Twelfth Hour. Good Press. This novel was originally published in 1907 by Grant Richards. It references an elderly Mrs William Crofton in Chapter IV "Aunt William".

== Further research ==
- Crofton, Henry Thomas (1911). Crofton Memoirs and account of John Crofton. York: Yorkshire Printing Company. OCLC 499678075.
- Crofton, Henry Thomas. "The Crofton Memoirs 1911". irishfamilyhistorycentre.com/. The Irish Family History Centre. (This link gives a summary of the contents of the above book).
