= William Ranwell =

English painter

William Ranwell (26 July 1797 – 5 October 1861) was an English landscape artist during the early 19th century. Ranwell exhibited as a Royal Academician and with Suffolk Street Galleries.

He married Frances Rutherford on 19 October 1828 in St Mary, Woolwich, and lived at 8 Beresford Terrace (now 42 Hillreach) in Woolwich between 1849 and 1861. A Blue Plaque was unveiled on 14 December 2010 by the Mayor of Greenwich.

Much of Ranwell's work is associated with river scenes in east London. Some of his work is held at the National Maritime Museum in Greenwich, reflecting his role in documenting navy shipbuilding and London dock construction. Further examples of his work can be found in the London Guildhall Library print collection.

His most widely known image, The launch of HMS "Trafalgar" at Woolwich dockyard on June 21, 1841 in the presence of Queen Victoria and the Prince Consort, was sold at auction in November 2000.
