= Day (surname) =

Origin
- Region of origin: Wales, England, Ireland

Day is an English and Irish surname. Notable people and characters with the surname Day include:

== A ==
- Albert Day (cricketer) (1865–1908), English cricketer for Yorkshire
- Albert Day (English footballer) (1918–1983), professional footballer for Ipswich
- Albert R. Day (1861–?), American state legislator from Maine
- Albert Day (politician) (1797–1876), American lieutenant governor of Connecticut
- Albert Day (Welsh footballer), Welsh professional footballer for Cardiff
- Albert Day (foundry), iron and brass founders in Mark, Somerset
- Al Day (1938–1979), American football player
- Alex Day (born 1989), British musician and YouTuber
- Alexander Day (artist) (1751–1841), British miniaturist and art dealer
- Alexander Day (con artist) (fl. 1722–1723), British confidence trickster
- Alf Day (1907–1997), Welsh footballer
- Alf Day (Australian footballer) (1884–1968), Australian rules footballer
- Alf Day (1907–1997), Welsh footballer
- Alf Day (Australian footballer) (1884–1968), Australian rules footballer
- Alfred Day (jockey) (1830–1868), British jockey
- Alfred Day (music theorist) (1810–1849), English music theorist
- A. N. Day (Alfred Norwood Day, 1868–1939), South Australian railways official
- Alice Day (1906–1995), American actress
- Alon Day (born 1991), Israeli racing driver
- Andra Day, stage name of American R&B singer, songwriter and actress Cassandra Batie (born 1984)
- Andy Day, British 21st century actor/television presenter
- Angela Day (born 1952), Canadian chess Woman International Master
- Ann Day (1938–2016), American politician
- Anne-Marie Day (born 1954), Canadian politician
- Archibald Day (1899–1970), Royal Navy officer and Hydrographer of the Navy
- Arthur Day (English cricketer) (1885–1969), English cricketer
- Arthur Day (Australian cricketer) (born 1933), Australian cricketer
- Arthur Day (golfer) (1878–1946), English golfer
- Arthur Louis Day (1869–1960), American geological physicist
- Arthur H. Day (1890–1967), American lawyer and politician from Ohio
- A. Grove Day (1904–1994), author, teacher, and authority on the history of Hawaii
- Ashley Day (Australian cricketer) (born 1999)
- Ashley Day (English cricketer) (born 1969)

== B ==
- Benjamin Henry Day (1810–1889), American illustrator and printer; founder of the original New York Sun
- Benjamin Henry Day Jr. (1838–1916), American illustrator and printer
- The Ben Day process, printing technology invented by Benjamin Henry Day Jr.
- Bert Day (1908–1977), Welsh rugby union international and rugby league player
- Bert Day (footballer, born 1894) (1894–1949), Australian rules footballer
- Bert Day (footballer, born 1900) (1900–1964), Australian rules footballer
- Besse Day (1889–1986), American statistician
- Bill Day (disambiguation)
- Bob Day (born 1952), Australian businessman and former politician
- Bob Day (athlete) (1944–2012), American long-distance runner
- Bob Day (musician) (1941–2013), half of the English pop duo The Allisons
- Bobby Day, stage name of American R&B singer Robert Byrd (1930–1990)
- Brian Day (born 1947), Canadian doctor and surgeon also known as Dr. Profit
- Brian Day (swimmer) (born c. 1938), English swimmer
- Bud Day (1925–2013), United States Air Force officer awarded the Medal of Honor
- Burke Day (1954–2017), American politician

== C ==
- Carol-Anne Day (born 1986), Canadian voice actor
- Catherine Day (civil servant) (born 1954), former European civil servant from Ireland
- Catherine Day (biochemist), New Zealand academic
- Boots Day (Charles Day, born 1947), former baseball player
- Charles Day (boot blacking manufacturer) (died 1836), founder of Day and Martins Blacking
- Charles Day (Medal of Honor) (1844–1901), American soldier in the American Civil War
- Charles Day (engineer) (1879–1931), American engineer and co-founder of Day & Zimmermann
- Charles Day (rower) (1914–1962), American rower
- Charlie Day (Charles Peckham Day, born 1976), American actor
- Charles Bernard Day (born 1957), American judicial nominee
- Charles Dewey Day (1806–1884), Canadian judge
- Charles W. Day (1836–1906), Wisconsin state senator from De Pere, Wisconsin
- Charles Wayne Day (1942–2008), American blues guitarist
- Chris Day (hepatologist) (born 1960), Vice-Chancellor of Newcastle University
- Chris Day (basketball), basketball coach
- Chris Crass, birth name of American anarchist activist
- Christian Day (born 1983), English rugby player
- Christine Day (born 1986), Jamaican sprinter
- Christine M. Day (born 1962), Canadian retail executive
- Christine Day (author), Indigenous American author
- Corinne Day (1962–2010), English fashion photographer, documentary photographer and fashion model

== D ==
- Daniel Day (manufacturer) (1767–1848), American pioneer in woollen manufacturing
- Daniel Day (cricketer) (1807–1887), English cricketer
- Dapper Dan (designer) (born 1944), American fashion designer, born Daniel Day
- Darren Day (born 1968), English actor
- David Day (Canadian author) (born 1947), author from British Columbia
- David Day (historian) (born 1949), Australian historian
- David Day (broadcaster) (1951–2015), Australian radio broadcaster, known as "Daisy"
- David Day (cricketer) (1916–1944), English cricketer and British Army officer
- Dave Day (musician) (1941–2008) of the punk band The Monks
- David Day (Minnesota politician) (1825–1896), politician from Minnesota Territory
- David Day (Missouri politician) (born 1963), American former politician in the Missouri House of Representatives
- David A. Day (missionary) (1854–1897), Lutheran missionary
- David F. Day (1847–1914), Union Army soldier and Medal of Honor recipient
- David Talbot Day (1859–1925), American chemist and geologist
- David V. Day (born 1936), British theologian and academic
- David V. Day (psychologist), American industrial-organizational psychologist, academic, and author
- David Van Day (born 1956), English singer and media personality
- Delbert Day, American engineer and inventor
- Dennis Day (1916–1988), Irish-American radio personality
- Dennis Day (artist) (born 1960), Canadian video artist
- Dennis Day (Mouseketeer) (1942–2018), American actor and director
- Dillon Day (born 1970), American pornographic actor
- Dillon Day (American football) (born 1991), American college football player
- Dominic Day (born 1985), Welsh rugby union player
- Don Day (1924–2010), Australian politician
- Donald S. Day (1895–1966), American reporter and World War II Nazi radio broadcaster
- Doris Day, stage name of Doris Kappelhoff (1922–2019), American singer, actress, and animal welfare advocate
- Dorothy Day (1897–1980), American religious and social activist
- Douglas Day (1932–2004), American novelist, biographer, and critic

== E ==
- Edgerton W. Day, Canadian pioneer and politician
- J. Edward Day (1914–1996), American businessman and political office-holder
- Edward William Day (1901–1985), U.S. federal judge
- Edward Day (cross-country skier) (born 1949), Canadian cross-country skier
- Edward Day (priest) (1738–1808), Archdeacon of Ardfert
- Edward Denny Day (1801–1876), Irish-Australian police magistrate
- Ellen Channing Day, American member of high society
- Emily Day, American beach volleyball player
- Eric Day, English footballer

== F ==
- Felicia Day, American actress
- Frances Day, American actress and singer popular in the United Kingdom in the 1930s
- Frances Sally Day (1816–1892), English painter
- Francis Day (1829–1889), British zoologist and colonial administrator
- Francis Day (artist) (1863–1942), American painter
- Francis Day (Madras) (1605–1673), English colonial administrator, considered one of the founders of Madras (now Chennai)
- Frank Day (disambiguation)

== G ==
- Gene Day, Canadian comic book artist
- George Day (bishop) (c. 1501–1556), Bishop of Chichester, 1543–1551, and vice-chancellor of the University of Cambridge in 1537
- George Day (Australian politician) (1826–1906), member of the New South Wales Parliament
- George Day (cricketer) (1879–1953), New Zealand cricketer
- George A. Day (1859–1927), justice of the Nebraska Supreme Court
- George C. Day (1871–1940), U.S. Navy rear admiral
- Bud Day (George E. Day, 1925–2013), U.S. Air Force colonel, Medal of Honor recipient
- George Edward Day (1815–1872), Welsh physician
- George Fiott Day (1820–1876), Royal Navy captain, Victoria Cross recipient
- George Lawrence Day, alias of John Mapes Adams (1871–1921), United States Marine and Medal of Honor recipient
- George S. Day, marketing specialist in the 1970s
- George T. Day, Free Will Baptist writer, publisher, pastor and professor
- Gerry Day (1922–2013), American film and television writer
- Giles Hiram Day (1839–1909), American politician
- Graham Day, Canadian/British business executive
- Graham Day (footballer) (1953–2021), English footballer
- Guy Day, co-founder of American advertising firm Chiat/Day

== H ==
- Hap Day, Canadian hockey player, referee, coach and general manager
- Harold Day (Australian footballer) (1890–1961), Australian rules footballer
- Harold Day (sportsman), English rugby player
- Harold Day (Royal Navy officer), Welsh World War I flying ace
- Harry Day (politician) (1880–1939), British labour party politician, Member of Parliament 1924–1931, 1935–1939
- Harry Day (rugby union) (1863–1911), Welsh international rugby union forward
- Harry G. Day (born 1906), American chemist and professor
- Harry S. Day (1871–1956), Ohio State Treasurer
- Heather Day, American artist
- Helen Day, American social worker and child welfare advocate
- Holman Day, American journalist and author
- Howie Day, American singer-songwriter

== I ==
- Icey Day (1891–1956), American politician

== J ==
- James Day (poet) (fl. 1637), English poet
- James Milford Day (1815–1894), Texas military figure
- James Plummer Day (1831–1905), American farmer, agricultural science and education advocate, and Dakota territorial politician
- James G. Day (1835–1898), justice of the Iowa Supreme Court
- James Roscoe Day (1845–1923), American minister and academic administrator
- James Day (cricketer) (1850–1895), English cricketer
- James Wentworth Day (1899–1983), British writer and broadcaster
- James C. Day, (1822–1911) American politician and soldier
- J. Edward Day (1914–1996), American businessman and political office-holder
- James Day (journalist) (1918–2008), American public television executive and performer
- James L. Day (1925–1998), U.S. Marine Corps general
- Jim Day (James E. Day, born 1946), Canadian equestrian
- Jim Day (host) (born 1965), American television sports broadcaster
- James Buddy Day, Canadian director, writer and producer
- James M. Day, American game designer
- Jamie Day (footballer, born 1979), currently assistant manager at Forest Green Rovers F.C.
- Jamie Day (footballer, born 1986), currently playing for Crawley Town F.C.
- Jamie Day (racing driver) (born 2005)
- Jamie Day (racing driver) (born 2005), Emirati-British racing driver
- Jason Day (actor) (born 1985), Peruvian actor
- Jason Day (fighter) (born 1981), Canadian mixed martial artist
- Jason Day (rower) (born 1970), Australian Olympic rower
- Jennifer Day (singer), American country music singer
- Jennifer Margery Day, Australian volleyball player
- Jennifer Day (Kansas politician), member of the Kansas House of Representatives
- Jen Day, member of the Nebraska Legislature
- Jeremiah Day, president of Yale University from 1817 to 1846
- Jill Day (singer), English singer and actress
- John Day (Arkansas politician), state legislator
- John Day (Nova Scotia legislator) (died 1775), merchant and politician in Nova Scotia
- John Day Jr. (died 1792), soldier and political figure in Nova Scotia
- John Day (Liberian judge) (1797–1859), Liberian politician and judge
- John Charles Day (1826–1908), English judge
- John Adam Day (1901–1966), politician in Devon, England
- John Day (Indiana politician) (born 1937), Democratic member of the Indiana House of Representatives
- John Day (Australian politician) (born 1955), Western Australian politician
- John Day, Transport Workers Union of America Local 100 Vice President
- Joe Day (ice hockey) (born 1968), American ice hockey center
- Joe Day (footballer) (born 1990), English football goalkeeper
- Joseph Day (inventor) (1855–1946), inventor of the modern two-stroke engine
- Joseph A. Day (born 1945), Canadian senator
- Joseph P. Day (1874–1944), American real estate entrepreneur
- Joseph Day (Massachusetts politician), representative to the Great and General Court
- Judson Leroy Day (1877–1944), American dentist and politician

== K ==
- Kayla Day, American tennis player
- Ken Day (cricketer) (1919–1991), English cricketer of the 1950s
- Ken Day (rugby league) (1936–1998), Australian rugby league footballer of the 1960s
- Kevin Day, English comedian and television sports presenter

== L ==
- Laraine Day (1920–2007), American actress
- Laurence J. Day, American politician
- Linda Day, American television director
- Lucille Lang Day (born 1947), American poet
- Luke Day, American revolutionary and dissident

== M ==
- Marele Day, Australian author
- Marceline Day, American actress
- Margie Day (1926–2014), stage name of Margaret Hoffler, American R&B singer
- Mark Day (racing driver) (born 1961), American racecar driver
- Mark Day (actor) (born 1978), Canadian actor
- Mark Day (film editor) (born 1958), British film editor
- Mark Day (singer), Canadian Idol season 6 contestant
- Mark Day (musician), member of the Happy Mondays
- Martin Day (writer), British screenwriter and novelist
- Martin Day (fighter), Japanese-born American mixed martial artist
- Martin Day (architect), Irish architect and builder
- Mary Gage Day (1857–1935), American physician, medical writer
- Mary L. Day (1836 – after 1883), American author
- Matt Day, Australian actor
- Matthias W. Day, American army officer and Medal of Honor recipient
- Maurice Day (bishop of Clogher) (1843–1923), Anglican bishop
- Maurice Day (bishop of Cashel and Waterford) (1816–1904), Church of Ireland bishop
- Maurice Day (dean of Waterford) (1858–1916), Irish Anglican priest
- Jake Day (Maurice Day, 1892–1983) American illustrator
- Melvin Day (1923–2016), New Zealand artist
- Merritt H. Day (1844–1900), namesake of Day County, South Dakota
- Mervyn Day, English professional footballer
- Miles Jeffery Game Day (1896–1918), British naval aviator and poet
- Morris Day, American musician, frontman of band The Time

== N ==
- Nick Day (statistician), English statistician and cancer epidemiologist
- Nicolas Day (born 1955), Australian wildlife artist

== P ==
- Pat Day (born 1953), American jockey
- Patrick Day (1992–2019), American boxer
- Paul Mario Day (1956–2025), English singer, lead vocalist of Iron Maiden, 1975–76
- Paul Day (sculptor) (born 1967), British sculptor
- Paul William Day, Australian producer, director, musician
- Paul Day (table tennis) (born 1958), English table tennis player
- Pea Ridge Day (real name: Henry Clyde Day), American baseball pitcher
- Peter Day (chemist) (1938–2020), British inorganic chemist
- Peter Day (broadcaster) (1947–2023), British broadcaster on BBC Radio
- Pete Day (born 1970), recording engineer, record producer and songwriter
- Peter Morton Day (1914–1984), journalist and ecumenical leader in the Episcopal Church in the United States
- Phil Day (artist) (born 1973), Australian artist

== R ==
- Robert Day (antiquarian) (1836–1914), Irish antiquarian and photographer
- Robert Day (Australian politician) (1886–1968), New South Wales politician
- Robert H. Day (judge) (1867–1933), lawyer and judge in Ohio
- Robert H. Day (soldier) (1835–1929), Union officer, railroad engineer and electrical engineer
- Robert Day (Irish politician, born 1746) (1746–1841), Irish politician, barrister and judge
- Robert Day (Irish politician, born 1884) (1884–1949), Irish Labour Party politician from Cork
- Robert Day (cartoonist) (1900–1985), American cartoonist
- Robert L. Day (1920–1999), mayor of Boise, Idaho
- Robert Day (director) (1922–2017), English film director
- Robert Day (footballer) (born 1944), former Australian rules footballer
- Robert Addison Day (1943–2023), businessman
- Robert Day (basketball) (born 1982), American basketball player
- Robin Day (1923–2000), British journalist and broadcaster
- Robin Day (designer) (1915–2010), British furniture designer
- Rowland Day (1779–1853), Congressman from New York
- Rufus M. Day, American politician
- Ryan Day (snooker player) (born 1980), Welsh professional snooker player
- Ryan Day, a past member of Attack! Attack! (Welsh band)

== S ==
- Samuel Day (sportsman) (1878–1950), English cricketer and footballer, known as Sammy Day
- Samuel S. Day (1808–1871), Canadian-born American Baptist missionary
- Samuel T. Day (1838–1877), American physician, plantation owner and politician
- Sam Day (jockey) (1802–1866), English jockey and uncle of
- Sam Day Jr. (1818–1838), English jockey
- Sam Day (Australian footballer) (born 1992), Australian rules footballer
- Sammy Day, the title character of the Belgium comic series Sammy
- Sam Day (rugby league) (born 1994), rugby league footballer
- Sandra Day O'Connor (1930–2023), née Day, United States Supreme Court associate justice
- Sarah Day, Australian poet
- Skyler Day, American actress
- Stockwell Day, Canadian politician

== T ==
- Theodore D. Day (1917–2003), New York politician
- Tom Day (rugby union) (1907–1980), Welsh rugby union player
- Tom Day (American football) (1935–2000), American football player
- Tom Day (footballer) (born 1997), English footballer

== W ==
- Walter Day, American businessman
- Walter Edwin Day (1880–1969), American farmer and politician
- William Day (lithographer) (1797–1845), British lithographer and watercolour artist
- Bill Day (filmmaker) (born 1959), American documentary filmmaker
- Bill Day (cartoonist), American cartoonist

== Z ==
- Zach Day (born 1978), American baseball player

== Fictional characters ==
- Bob Day, a character in the American sitcom New Girl
- Geoffrey Day, in the 1996 novel Infinite Jest by David Foster Wallace
- Jessica Day (New Girl), in the TV show New Girl

== See also ==
- General Day (disambiguation)
- Justice Day (disambiguation)
- Senator Day (disambiguation)
- Daye (disambiguation)
- Days (surname)
- Dayes, a list of persons with this surname
- Day-Lewis, a list of persons with this surname
