= James Day =

James Day may refer to:

- James Day (poet) (fl. 1637), English poet
- James Milford Day (1815–1894), Texas military figure
- James Plummer Day (1831–1905), American farmer, agricultural science and education advocate, and Dakota territorial politician
- James G. Day (1835–1898), justice of the Iowa Supreme Court
- James Roscoe Day (1845–1923), American minister and academic administrator
- James Day (cricketer) (1850–1895), English cricketer
- James Wentworth Day (1899–1983), British writer and broadcaster
- James C. Day, (1822–1911) American politician and soldier
- J. Edward Day (1914–1996), American businessman and political office-holder
- James Day (journalist) (1918–2008), American public television executive and performer
- James L. Day (1925–1998), U.S. Marine Corps general
- Jim Day (James E. Day, born 1946), Canadian equestrian
- Jim Day (host) (born 1965), American television sports broadcaster
- James Buddy Day, Canadian director, writer and producer
- James M. Day, American game designer

== See also ==
- Jamie Day (disambiguation)
- St James Day
