= Day (disambiguation) =

A day is a unit of temporal measurement. It may also mean daytime, the part of the day when sunlight provides illumination.

Day, DAY or Days may also refer to:

== People and fictional characters ==
- Day (surname), a list of people and fictional characters
- Days (surname), a list of people
- Day9, alias of Sean Plott, former professional gamer and e-sports commentator

== Art ==
- Day (Michelangelo), a sculpture in the Medici Chapels in Florence, Italy
- Day, an 1881 painting by William-Adolphe Bouguereau

== Film and television ==
- Days (2020 film), a Taiwanese drama
- Days (2023 film), a Canadian documentary
- "Day" (The Acolyte), an episode of The Acolyte

== Literature ==
- Day (Wiesel novel), a 1962 novel by Elie Wiesel
- Day (Kennedy novel), a 2007 novel by A. L. Kennedy
- "Days" (poem), a short poem by Philip Larkin
- Days (manga), a manga series by Tsuyoshi Yasuda

== Music ==
- DJ Day, American DJ, producer, and musician

=== Albums ===
- Days (Real Estate album), 2011
- Days (The Mountain Goats album), 2026
- Days, by Tim Knol, 2011
- Day, an EP by Jeong Se-woon, 2019

=== Songs ===
- "Days" (Alisa Mizuki song), 1997
- "Days" (Flow song), 2005
- "Days" (High and Mighty Color song), 2005
- "Days" (The Kinks song), 1968; covered by Kirsty MacColl, 1989
- "Days", a 1972 song by Steve Peregrin Took from the 1995 posthumous album The Missing Link To Tyrannosaurus Rex
- "Days"/"Green", by Ayumi Hamasaki, 2008
- "Day", by Katatonia from Brave Murder Day
- "Days", by David Bowie from Reality
- "Days", by the Drums from Portamento
- "Days", by Mother Mother from Grief Chapter

== Geography ==
=== United States ===
- Day, California, an unincorporated community
- Day, Florida, a census-designated place
- Day, Minnesota, an unincorporated community
- Day, Missouri, an unincorporated community
- Day, New York, a town
- Day, Wisconsin, a town
- Day County, South Dakota
- Day Township, Michigan
- Days Canyon, a valley in Utah
- Black Mountain (Milpitas, California), also known as Mount Day

=== Elsewhere ===
- Le Day, a hamlet in the municipality of Vallorbe, Vaud canton, Switzerland

== Industry ==
- Day (automobile), an automobile built in Detroit, Michigan, from 1911 to 1914
- John Day Company, an American publisher
- Day Software, an American/Swiss content management system vendor

== Other uses ==
- Day language, a Mbum-Day language of southern Chad
- DAY, IATA code for Dayton International Airport, Ohio, United States

== See also ==
- The Day (disambiguation)
- The Days (disambiguation)
- Day-Lewis, a surname
- Daye (disambiguation)
- Dayes, a surname
