= Albert Day =

Albert Day may refer to:

- Albert Day (cricketer) (1865–1908), English cricketer for Yorkshire
- Albert Day (English footballer) (1918–1983), professional footballer for Ipswich
- Albert R. Day (1861–?), American state legislator from Maine
- Albert Day (politician) (1797–1876), American lieutenant governor of Connecticut
- Albert Day (Welsh footballer), Welsh professional footballer for Cardiff
- Albert Day (foundry), iron and brass founders in Mark, Somerset
- Al Day (1938–1979), American football player
