= Henry Day =

Henry Day may refer to:

- Pea Ridge Day (Henry Clyde Day, 1899–1934), pitcher in Major League Baseball
- Harry Day (rugby union) (Henry Thomas Day, 1863–1911), Welsh rugby union forward
- Henry Day (priest) (1865–1951), British priest
- Henry Noble Day (1808–1890), American philosopher
- Henry Day (British Army officer), British soldier

== See also ==
- Harry Day (disambiguation)
- Day (surname)
