= Harold Day =

Harold Day may refer to:

- Harold Day (Australian footballer) (1890–1961), Australian rules footballer
- Harold Day (Royal Navy officer) (1897–1918), Welsh-born World War I flying ace
- Harold Day (sportsman) (1898–1972), English rugby union footballer and cricketer

== See also ==
- Harry Day (disambiguation)
- Day (surname)
