= Alfred Day =

Alfred Day may refer to:

- Alf Day (1907–1997), Welsh footballer
- Alf Day (Australian footballer) (1884–1968), Australian rules footballer
- Alfred Day (jockey) (1830–1868), British jockey
- Alfred Day (music theorist) (1810–1849), English music theorist
- A. N. Day (Alfred Norwood Day, 1868–1939), South Australian railways official
