= Bert Day (disambiguation) =

Bert Day (1908–1977) was a Welsh rugby hooker who played rugby union for Newport and rugby league for Salford.

Bert Day may also refer to:

- Bert Day (footballer, born 1894) (1894–1949), Australian rules footballer for Essendon
- Bert Day (footballer, born 1900) (1900–1964), Australian rules footballer for St Kilda
