= David Day =

David Day may refer to:

- David Day (Canadian author) (born 1947), author from British Columbia
- David Day (historian) (born 1949), Australian historian
- David Day (broadcaster) (1951–2015), Australian radio broadcaster, known as "Daisy"
- David Day (cricketer) (1916–1944), English cricketer and British Army officer
- Dave Day (musician) (1941–2008) of the punk band The Monks
- David Day (Minnesota politician) (1825–1896), politician from Minnesota Territory
- David Day (Missouri politician) (born 1963), American former politician in the Missouri House of Representatives
- David A. Day (missionary) (1854–1897), Lutheran missionary
- David F. Day (1847–1914), Union Army soldier and Medal of Honor recipient
- David Talbot Day (1859–1925), American chemist and geologist
- David V. Day (born 1936), British theologian and academic
- David V. Day (psychologist), American industrial-organizational psychologist, academic, and author
- David Van Day (born 1956), English singer and media personality

== See also ==
- Dave Days (born 1991), American musician
