= Derbyshire Record Office =

County record office for Derbyshire, England

Agency overview
- Formed: 1962
- Jurisdiction: Derbyshire, City
- Headquarters: Derbyshire Record Office, New Street, Matlock, Derbyshire, DE4 3FE
- Agency executive: Sarah Chubb, Archives and Local Studies Manager
- Website: www.derbyshire.gov.uk/leisure/record-office/derbyshire-record-office.aspx

The Derbyshire Record Office, established in 1962, is the county record office for Derbyshire, England. It holds archives and local studies material for the County of Derbyshire and the City of Derby and Diocese of Derby. It is situated in Matlock. The Record Office contains more than four miles of original Derbyshire records.

Derbyshire County Council has been collecting records since 1889, but it was not until 1962 the Derbyshire Record Office was opened. In 2013, the Local Studies Library in Matlock joined the Derbyshire Record Office. To enable this to happen the building was refurbished and an extension was built costing £4 million. The first County Archivist was Joan Sinar, previously County Archivist at Devon Record Office. She was succeeded by Margaret O'Sullivan.

== Archive Collection ==
- Official records of the County council, City Council, Borough Councils, District Councils, Town Councils and Parish councils along with their predecessors
- Records for hospitals, workhouses, police, local courts, schools, wills and further education institutions
- Diocesan and other church/parish records including the Diocese of Derby official records and registers for over 400 Anglican parishes. These include baptism, marriage and burial registers from the 16th century onwards
- Registers of baptisms, marriages and burials in non-conformist chapels from the 17th century onwards
- Other archives from Derbyshire industries, businesses, societies, charities, estates, families and voluntary groups
- Manuscript and printed plans from the 17th century onwards including estate plans, tithe maps, enclosure maps and early ordnance survey maps

== Local Studies Collection ==
- Books including county, town and village histories
- Journals
- Newspapers such as the Matlock Mercury.
- Old trade and telephone directories
- Census 1841-1891 on microfilm and 1841-1911 via Ancestry.com
- Old and modern Ordnance Survey and other mapping
- Photographs and other illustration collections
