= Edward Day =

Edward Day may refer to:

- J. Edward Day (1914–1996), American businessman and political office-holder
- Edward William Day (1901–1985), U.S. federal judge
- Edward Day (cross-country skier) (born 1949), Canadian cross-country skier
- Edward Day (priest) (1738–1808), Archdeacon of Ardfert
- Edward Denny Day (1801–1876), Irish-Australian police magistrate

== See also ==
- Ned Day (1945–1987), journalist
- Edward Dayes (1763–1804), artist
