= Paul Day =

Paul Day may refer to:

- Paul Mario Day (1956–2025), English singer, lead vocalist of Iron Maiden, 1975–76
- Paul Day (sculptor) (born 1967), British sculptor
- Paul William Day, Australian producer, director, musician
- Paul Day (table tennis) (born 1958), English table tennis player
