= Jennifer Day =

Jennifer Day may refer to:

- Jennifer Day (singer), American country music singer
- Jennifer Margery Day, Australian volleyball player
- Jennifer Day (Kansas politician), member of the Kansas House of Representatives
- Jen Day, member of the Nebraska Legislature
