= Arthur Day =

Arthur Day may refer to:

- Arthur Day (English cricketer) (1885–1969), English cricketer
- Arthur Day (Australian cricketer) (born 1933), Australian cricketer
- Arthur Day (golfer) (1878–1946), English golfer
- Arthur Louis Day (1869–1960), American geological physicist
- Arthur H. Day (1890–1967), American lawyer and politician from Ohio
- A. Grove Day (1904–1994), author, teacher, and authority on the history of Hawaii

== See also ==
- Arthur's Day, an annual series of music events worldwide
