= Harry Day (disambiguation) =

Harry Day (1898–1977) was a Royal Marine and RAF pilot during the Second World War, prisoner of war and noted escapee.

Harry Day may also refer to:

- Harry Day (politician) (1880–1939), British labour party politician, Member of Parliament 1924–1931, 1935–1939
- Harry Day (rugby union) (1863–1911), Welsh international rugby union forward
- Harry G. Day (born 1906), American chemist and professor
- Harry S. Day (1871–1956), Ohio State Treasurer

== See also ==
- Harold Day (disambiguation)
- Henry Day (disambiguation)
- Day (surname)
