= The Days =

The Days may refer to:

== Music ==
- The Days (band), British band
- "The Days" (Avicii song), 2014
- "The Days" (Chrystal song), 2024
- "The Days", song by Patrick Wolf from Lupercalia
- "The Days", song by Shinhwa from Winter Story
- "I Giorni", song by Ludovico Einaudi from I Giorni
- "Les Jours", song by Charles Aznavour from Aznavour toujours
- "Les Jours", song by Constance Amiot from 12eme Parallele
- "The Days", song by Sandro Cavazza

== Other uses ==
- The Days (1993 film), a Chinese film
- The Days (2006 film), a Canadian short drama film
- The Days (American TV series), 2004 TV series
- The Days (Japanese TV series), a 2023 TV series about the Fukushima nuclear disaster
- The Days (book) (Arabic: Al-Ayyam) an autobiography by Taha Hussein

== See also ==
- Day (disambiguation)
- The Day (disambiguation)
