= Devon Record Offices =

Archive and county record office for Devon

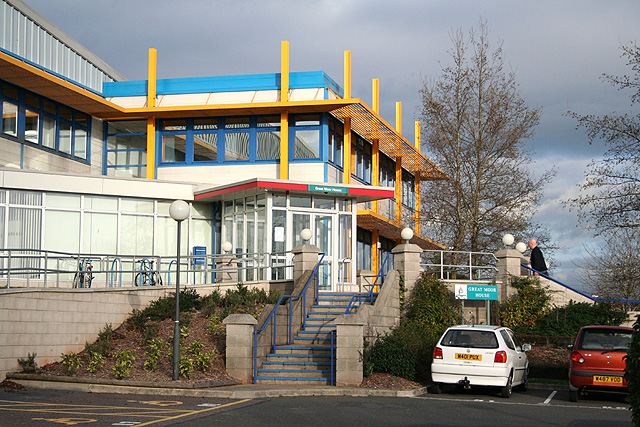
Great Moor House, the building that houses the Devon Heritage Centre

There are three local archives covering the historic county of Devon, England. The Devon Heritage Centre in Exeter is the main archive. It has a branch office, the North Devon Record Office in Barnstaple (established in 1988), which is the repository for records broadly relating to North Devon. Since 2014 the joint service has been run by the South West Heritage Trust under the name of the Devon Archives and Local Studies Service.

In addition, there is The Box in Plymouth, a new museum, art gallery and archive for the South West which opened in September 2020. Alongside local archives from the former Plymouth and West Devon Record Office, The Box holds materials from the former South West Film & Television Archive, South West Image Bank and Plymouth City Museum and Art Gallery.

== Devon Heritage Centre ==
The Devon Heritage Centre (DHC) is the successor to the Devon Record Office (DRO) that was established by Devon County Council in 1952. The DRO incorporated the Exeter City Record Office that had collected Devon's records since 1946, when it took over from the Exeter City Library, which had collected documents since the early 20th century. In 2005 the DRO moved into a specially-constructed building at Great Moor House, Sowton Business Park, Exeter. A restructuring of services led to the creation of the Devon Heritage Service in November 2011 with the aim of integrating the collections of the DRO and the Westcountry Studies Library, and from autumn 2012 the Westcountry Studies Library that had been housed in Exeter city centre, moved into Great Moor House which was renamed the Devon Heritage Centre. On 1 November 2014 Devon Heritage Services was transferred from the County Council to the management of the South West Heritage Trust (an independent charity, which also runs Somerset Archives and Local Studies), and was rebranded as the Devon Archives and Local Studies Service.

Among the holdings of the DHC are the complete records of the Devon Quarter Sessions courts from 1592 until their abolition in 1971; this is the earliest uninterrupted series of such records in the country. Other holdings include the records of the city of Exeter from c.1100; the records of the Diocese of Exeter (which included Cornwall until 1875) from the 13th century; Anglican church records for the whole of Devon from the 16th century; and the records of many of the major Devon families. Also housed at the DHC is the National Meteorological Archive which includes daily weather reports for the United Kingdom from 1869 and many earlier documents.

== See also ==
- Joan Sinar, first county archivist, 1952–1962
