= The Day =

The Day may refer to:

== Film and television ==
- The Day (1914 film), an Australian silent film
- The Day (1960 film), a short film
- The Day (2011 film), a Canadian film
- The Day (2022 film), a Bangladeshi–Iran joint production film
- The Day, a television news program produced by Deutsche Welle
- The Day (TV series), a 2023 South Korean television series

== Music ==
- The Day (EP), a 2015 EP by Day6
- The Day (Babyface album), 1996
- The Day (Deen album), 1998
- "The Day" (Moby song), 2011
- "The Day" (K.Will and Baekhyun song), 2016
- "The Day", a song by They Might Be Giants from the album They Might Be Giants, 1986

== News media ==
- The Day (New London), a Connecticut, US newspaper founded in 1881
- The Day (website), British news website for schoolchildren
- The Day (Kyiv), a Kyiv, Ukraine newspaper founded in 1996

== Other ==
- Yoma, "The Day" in Aramaic, the fifth tractate of Seder Moed ("Order of Festivals") of the Mishnah and of the Talmud

== See also ==
- Day (disambiguation)
- The Days (disambiguation)
