= Frank Day =

Frank Day may refer to:

- Frank A. Day (1855–1928), Minnesota legislator
- Frank Day (artist) (1902–1976), Native American artist
- Frank Miles Day (1861–1918), Philadelphia-based architect
- Frank Parker Day (1881–1950), Canadian athlete, academic and author
- Frank R. Day (1853–1899), entrepreneur and politician in Los Angeles and Monterey, California
