= Joan Sinar =

English archivist

Joan Collier Sinar, later Ferguson, FRHistS (1 May 1925 – 18 January 2015) was an English archivist who set up the county record offices for Devon and Derbyshire.

== Career ==
Sinar was born in Leigh, Lancashire, the daughter of Frank Sinar, a mining surveyor, and his wife Ruth, née Collier. She was educated at Leigh Girls' Grammar School and at Somerville College, Oxford University, where she studied Modern History. At Somerville she was a contemporary and friend of Margaret Roberts (later Thatcher). She graduated in 1946, and went on to study for an MA at the University of Manchester, awarded in 1949.

She began work in 1948 as an assistant archivist at Staffordshire Record Office (established a year earlier). In 1952 she took up an appointment as Assistant Records Officer (effectively county archivist) for Devon, where she established the Devon Record Office. In 1962 she moved to Derbyshire to become County Archivist there, and to establish the Derbyshire Record Office. She retired in 1988, shortly before the office moved into new premises.

== Other activities ==
Throughout her time in Derbyshire, Sinar was active in the work of the Derbyshire Archaeological Society: she edited the Derbyshire Archaeological Journal from 1970 to 1976, and Derbyshire Miscellany, the society's local history magazine, from 1970 to 1982. In 1977, she became a founding committee member of the Derbyshire Record Society. Following her retirement, she helped establish the Derbyshire Historic Gardens Trust in 1989.

She lectured widely to local groups, and was an honorary lecturer in the University of Sheffield extramural department.

She was also active in the Church of England, and was admitted a lay reader in the Diocese of Derby in 1991. She served for about five years on the council of the Modern Churchpeople's Union.

== Honours ==
Sinar was elected a Fellow of the Royal Historical Society in 1974.

== Personal life ==
Following her retirement, Sinar entered into a relationship with John Ferguson, a retired nurse and a member of her church congregation. The couple lived successively in mid-Derbyshire, in Wiltshire (where they married, in 2002), in southern Spain, and finally near Newtownards, County Down, where Sinar died in 2015. She was survived by her husband.

== Publications ==
- The Castle of Exeter. Exeter: Devon Record Office, 1956
- "Some medieval and modern benefactions in Kingsbridge and the neighbourhood", Devonshire Association Report and Transactions 90 (1958), pp. 167–78
- The Pentrich Revolution 1817. Matlock: Pentrich Festival Organising Committee, 1967
- "John Morton Bestall 1921–1973: a memoir", Derbyshire Archaeological Journal 93 (1973), pp. 5–8
- Derbyshire's Architectural Heritage: a bibliographical guide (with Vanessa Doe and Patrick Strange). Matlock: Derbyshire County Council, 1975. ISBN 0904369021
- Derbyshire: an illustrated history. Matlock: Derbyshire Library Service, 1979. ISBN 0903463067
- Derbyshire Historic Buildings Trust: the first 20 years. Wirksworth: Derbyshire Historic Buildings Trust, 1994
- "The early days of the Derbyshire Record Office" (as Joan Ferguson), in Philip Riden and David G. Edwards (eds), Essays in Derbyshire History: presented to Gladwyn Turbutt, Derbyshire Record Society 30, Chesterfield, 2006, pp. 266–80 ISBN 9780946324262

== Sources ==
- "Joan Sinar, county archivist – obituary". The Telegraph. 24 April 2015.
- Riden, Philip (2015). "Obituary: Joan Sinar (1925–2015)". Archives and Records. 36 (2): 259–62. doi:10.1080/23257962.2015.1070724.
