= Jamie Day =

Jamie Day is the name of:

- Jamie Day (footballer, born 1979), currently assistant manager at Forest Green Rovers F.C.
- Jamie Day (footballer, born 1986), currently playing for Crawley Town F.C.
- Jamie Day (racing driver) (born 2005)

== See also ==
- James Day (disambiguation)
