= William Day =

William, Will, Bill, or Billy Day may refer to:

== Arts and entertainment ==
- William Day (lithographer) (1797–1845), British lithographer and watercolour artist
- Bill Day (filmmaker) (born 1959), American documentary filmmaker
- Bill Day (cartoonist), American cartoonist

== Law and politics ==
- William Day (Australian politician) (fl. 1861), Australian politician in New South Wales
- William R. Day (1849–1923), American diplomat and Supreme Court Justice
- William Louis Day (1876–1936), American judge
- William J. Day (1876–1950), American judge from Massachusetts
- William S. Day (1923–1984), American politician in the state of Washington

== Sports ==
- William Day (horseman) (1823–1908), British racehorse trainer
- Bill Day (baseball) (1867–1923), American baseball player
- Bill Day (alpine skier) (1934–2024), Australian Olympic skier
- Billy Day (1936–2018), English footballer
- Will Day (born 2001), Australian rules footballer

== Other people ==
- William Day (bishop) (1529–1596), English clergyman
- William Day (divine) (died 1684), English clergyman
- William Day (sea captain) (1715–1797), American naval captain
- William Day (architect) (fl. 1800), Irish architect
- William H. Day (1825–1900), American abolitionist
- William Scott Day (1951–2006), American prison escapee and spree killer

== Other uses ==
- SS William R. Day, a Liberty ship
