= Albert Day (foundry) =

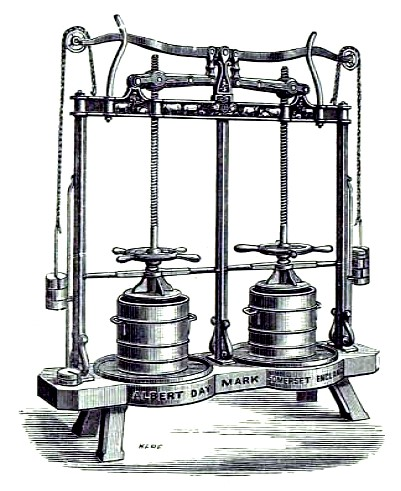
A cheese press made by Albert Day

Albert Day & Sons were iron and brass founders in Mark, Somerset, in the early twentieth century.

Records are held at the Somerset Heritage Centre (now managed by the South West Heritage Trust).
