= General Day =

General Day may refer to:

- Allan Day (fl. 1980s–2020s), U.S. Air Force major general
- Hannibal Day (1804–1891), U.S. Army brigadier general
- James L. Day (1925–1998), U.S. Marine Corps major general
- Karl S. Day (1896–1973), U.S. Marine Corps lieutenant general
