= Days (surname) =

Days is a surname. Notable people with the surname include:

- Alice T. Days, American documentary filmmaker
- Braheme Days Jr. (born 1995), American shot putter
- Darius Days (born 1999), American basketball player
- Dave Days (born 1991), American musician
- Drew S. Days III (1941–2020), American lawyer
- Rita Heard Days (born 1950), American politician

== See also ==
- Day (surname)
