= Bath Record Office =

Achieves record in Bath

Bath Record Office holds the archives for the City of Bath, England. The archives are held at the Guildhall, High Street, Bath and run by the Bath & North East Somerset Council. Their mission statement reads "Bath Record Office collects and keeps safe historical records relating to Bath & North East Somerset and its people".

The significance of the collections held by Bath Record Office is demonstrated by their designation as a Collection of Outstanding Importance. At the core of the collections are the records of Bath City Council, for which the Record Office holds the original charters, minutes, leases, rate books and a wide range of other records of the Corporation and the council from 1189 to the present day. The city records are complemented by the records of official bodies such as the law courts, the police, and the Board of Guardians, together with the records for petty sessions, which dealt with minor cases of law-breaking, and for quarter sessions, which dealt with more serious criminal cases. The Bath Board of Guardians was responsible for the administration of poor relief, either in the workhouse or for poor people in their own homes. The Record Office also holds "deposited records" for a wide range of societies and organisations, businesses, and individuals in Bath.

In 2017, the Local Studies Reference Collection, formerly held in Bath Central Library, was transferred to Bath Record Office.

== See also ==
- Somerset Archives and Local Studies
