= Days Canyon =

Coordinates: 40°10′13″N 111°38′21″W

Days Canyon is a canyon in the Wasatch Range in eastern Utah County, Utah, United States.

== Description ==
The canyon is located within the Uinta-Wasatch-Cache National Forest, about 6.75 miles (10.86 km) east of downtown Springville, and is a tributary of the Right Fork Hobble Creek Canyon. It has two tributaries of its own, Left Fork Days Canyon and Right Fork Days Canyon. The main canyon extends roughly southeast from the Right Fork Hobble Creek Canyon for about 4,250 feet (1,300 m) before splitting. Left Fork Days Canyon then continues easterly for about 1.85 miles (2.98 km) and Right Fork Days Canyon continues southerly for about 1.5 miles (2.4 km).

The canyon was named for Abraham Day, an early settler that opened the Cherry Picnic area (now Cherry Campground) at the mouth of the canyon. A day use only hiking trail begins the Right Fork Hobble Creek Canyon and continues through Left Fork Days Canyon to connect with the trail in Kirkman Hollow (another tributary of the Right Fork Hobble Creek Canyon).

== See also ==
- List of canyons and gorges in Utah
