= Mary L. Day =

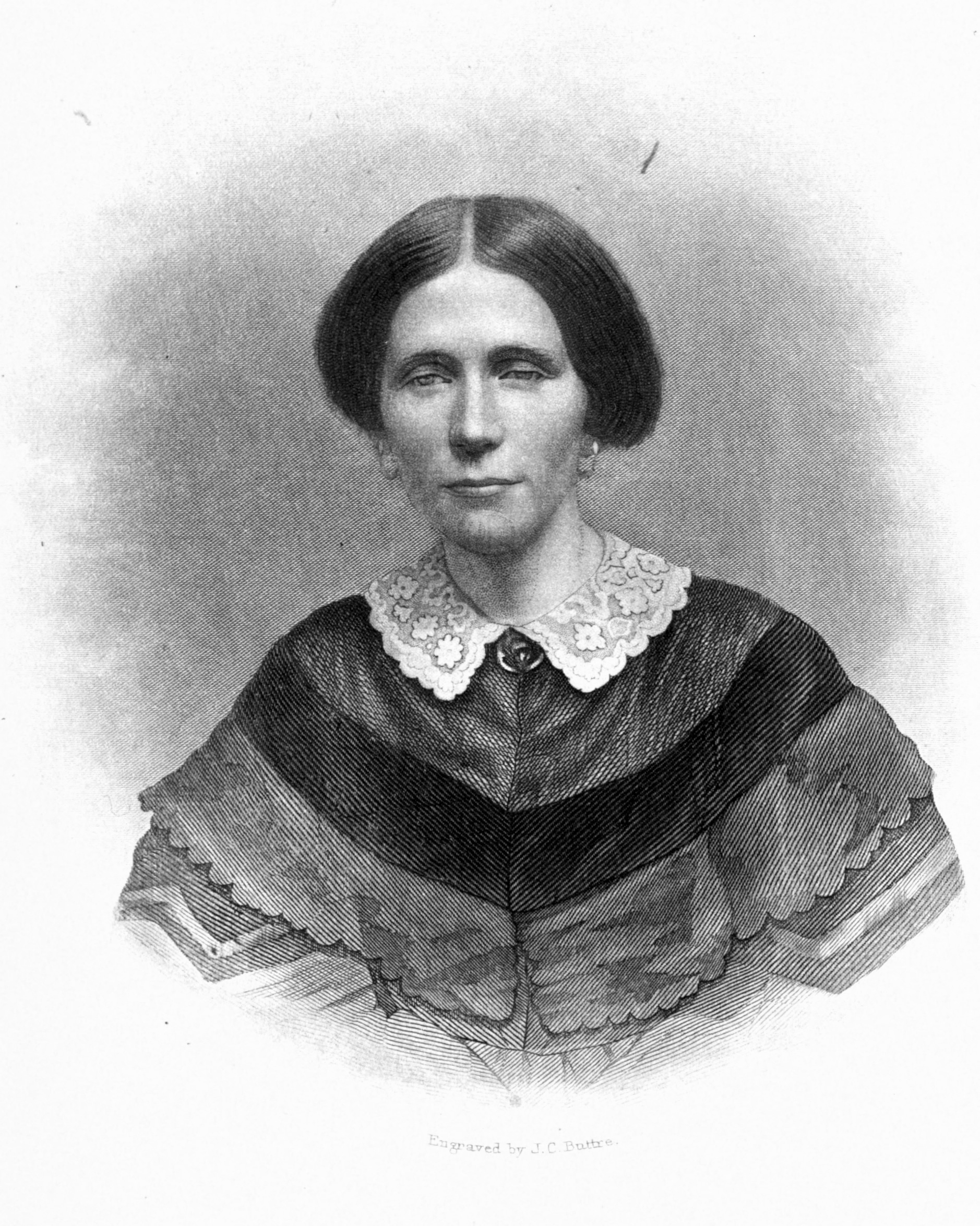
- Mary L. Day, from the frontispiece of her 1859 memoir.
- Born: 1836; Baltimore, Maryland
- Other name: Mary L. Day Arms (after marriage)
- Occupation: Writer
- Notable work: Incidents in the Life of a Blind Girl (1859); The World as I Have Found It (1878)

Mary L. Day (born 1836, died after 1883) was an American writer, best known for her 1859 memoir Incidents in the Life of a Blind Girl and its 1878 sequel, The World as I Have Found It.

== Early life ==
Day was born in 1836, in Baltimore, and moved to Michigan with her parents as a small child. They lived in a log cabin until her mother died and her widowed father moved away, leaving the five Day children to the care of other families.

When she was twelve, Day lost her sight in a sudden attack of inflammation. Various interventions were attempted, including surgeries, but she remained blind. A foster family, the Cooks, read to her and taught her to knit. She moved to Chicago at 17, to live with a sister there, and then to Baltimore in search of more help. She enrolled at the Maryland Institution for the Blind in 1855.

== Career ==
Day was one of a handful of blind authors familiar to American readers in mid-nineteenth-century. She wrote two memoirs, Incidents in the Life of a Blind Girl (1859) and The World as I Have Found It (1878). She sold copies of Incidents to support herself, traveling the United States with a companion, and making personal appearances. She also sold her knitting, her beading, and her handwoven baskets. She visited with President James Buchanan, who bought a book from her. She visited with Susan B. Anthony, but the encounter was "cruel", in Day's account, as Anthony scolded her and advocated restrictions on blind marriage and parenthood.

The World as I Have Found It carried an introduction by Charles Deems, a noted Methodist preacher. Among the stories in the sequel were her impressions of the Solid Muldoon, a "petrified man" hoax in Colorado. She also traveled to various American cities selling the second book.

== Personal life and legacy ==
Before 1878, Mary L. Day married a businessman known as "Mr. Arms". She was living in Shasta County, California, in 1883. Day's writings continue to be studied as the works of a blind woman in nineteenth-century America.
