= Edward Denny Day =

Police magistrate in New South Wales, Australia (1801-1876)

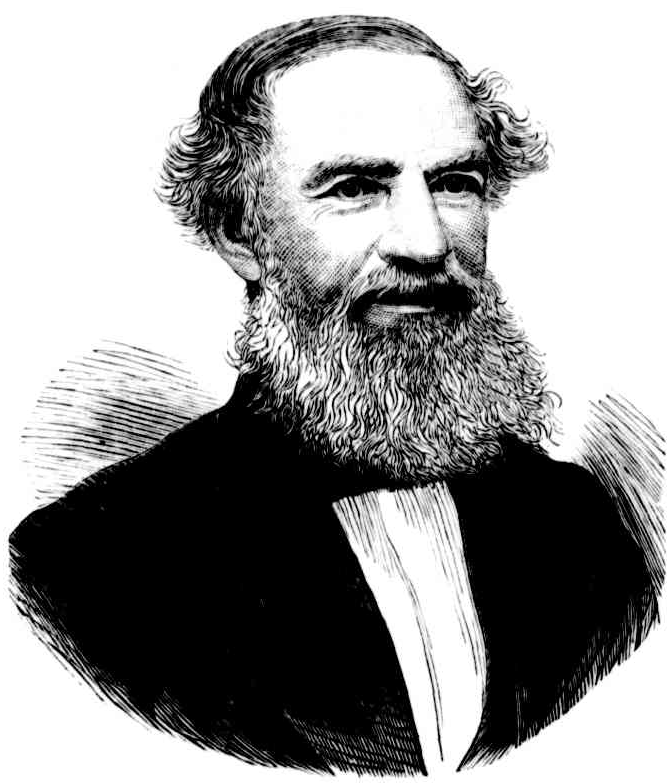

Edward Denny Day (1801 - 6 May 1876) was an Irish-Australian police magistrate famous for arresting the perpetrators of the Myall Creek Massacre and capturing the bushranger Edward Davis.

== Early life ==
Denny Day, as he was known, was born in Tralee, Country Kerry, Ireland in 1801. In 1820 he joined the 46th Regiment. In 1833 he became a lieutenant in the 62nd Regiment. He served some time in India until 1834 when he resigned due to ill health.

== Duties of police magistrate ==
In 1835 he arrived in Sydney to work as clerk to the Executive Council. He worked in the office of the Colonial Secretary Alexander Macleay. In January 1836 he became the magistrate for the Vale of Clywdd. In January 1837 he served as magistrate in Maitland. In June 1838 he organised mounted police to arrest the 11 of 12 men responsible for the Myall Creek Massacre In 1840 he organised the capture of bushranger Edward Davis. He arranged the capture of two other bushrangers Davidson and Smith. Between 1841 and 1842 he became the commissioner for the Court of Requests in Maitland mainly working on insolvent estates. In September he announced to the community that he was replacing Captain Inness as superintendent of Sydney Police. On 1 January 1851 he was appointed the provincial inspector of police for the northern district of Sydney. In 1853 he was stipendiary magistrate in Port Macquarie. Between 1858 until illness and attacks of paralysis in 1869 forced his retirement as magistrate in Maitland.

== Personal life ==
In 1836 he married Margaret the daughter of postmaster-general James Raymond. The couple had eleven children together. After the capture of Davis the residents of Scone presented him with a plate for his services. He was a foundation member of the Australian Immigration Association and was elected chairman of the Maitland branch On 16 February 1844 he laid the foundation stone for the new gaol at East Maitland. In January 1846 he laid the foundation of a new hospital at Maitland. He was unsuccessful as a businessman and his estate was sequestrated in 1848. He died on 6 May 1876. He is buried at St Peter's Burial Ground, East Maitland. At St Peter's Church, Maitland there is a stained glass window dating back to 1887 with the inscription: "To the Glory of God and in memory of Edward Denny Day of the 62nd Regiment who fell asleep 6 May 1876."
