= Senator Day =

Senator Day may refer to:

- Albert R. Day (1861–1924), Maine State Senate
- Ann Day (1938–2016), Arizona State Senate
- Arthur H. Day (1890–1967), Ohio State Senate
- Charles W. Day (1836–1906), Wisconsin State Senate
- Clint Day (born 1959), Georgia State Senate
- Connie Day (Nebraska politician) (1949–2001), Nebraska State Senate
- Dick Day (born 1937), Minnesota State Senate
- Frank A. Day (1855–1928), Minnesota State Senate
- Jen Day (born 1981), Nebraska State Senate
- L. B. Day (1932–1986), Oregon State Senate
- Luther Day (1813–1885), Ohio State Senate
- Theodore D. Day (1917–2003), New York State Senate
- William S. Day (1923–1984), Washington State Senate

== See also ==
- Rita Heard Days (born 1950), Missouri State Senate
