= Daye (disambiguation) =

Daye is a city in Hubei, China.

Daye may also refer to:

== China ==
- Daye dialect (大冶话), a dialect spoken in Daye
- Daye, era name of Emperor Yang of Sui during his reign (605–618)
- Daye Group, a geological formation
- Ye the Great or Daye (大业), a figure from Chinese mythology
- Daye, Cenxi (大业镇), a town in Guangxi, China
- Daye, Dengfeng (大冶镇), a town in Henan, China

== Surname ==
- Austin Daye (born 1988), American professional basketball player
- Buddy Daye, Canadian boxer
- Darren Daye (born 1960), American professional basketball player
- Daryl Daye (born 1963), American football coach
- Gabrielle Daye (1911–2005), British television actress
- Irene Daye (1918–1971), American jazz singer
- Joseph Daye (born 1990), Australian rules footballer
- Pierre Daye (1892–1960), Belgian collaborationist
- Prince Daye (born 1978), Liberian international football striker
- Stephen Daye (c. 1594–1668), British North American printer

== Other ==
- Day language, a Mbum-Day language of southern Chad, also spelled Daye

== See also ==
- Day (disambiguation)
