= 126th Illinois Infantry Regiment =

Union Army infantry regiment

126th Regiment Illinois Volunteer Infantry
- Illinois flag
- Active: September 2, 1862, to July 12, 1865
- Country: United States
- Allegiance: Union
- Branch: Infantry

The 126th Illinois Volunteer Infantry was an infantry regiment in the Union Army during the American Civil War.

== Service ==
The 126th Illinois Infantry was raised in response to President Abraham Lincoln's call for 300,000 volunteers in the late summer of 1862. The recruits were all from Moultrie, Shelby, Montgomery, Mercer, and Rock Island Counties. It was organized in Alton, Illinois beginning on September 2, 1862 and mustered in for three years service on September 4 under the command of Colonel Jonathan Richmond.

The regiment took the field on November 20, 1862, manning the fortifications along the Mississippi River at Columbus for a week before joining Ulysses S. Grant's army at LaGrange, and being attached to the XIII Corps. They spent the winter guarding supply lines and railroads around Jackson and Humboldt. Staying behind while the main force advanced down the Mississippi River and against Jackson, the regiment eventually joined in the Siege of Vicksburg on May 28, 1863. They were present for the Confederate surrender on July 4 and were then assigned to duty in Helena. From August 1 to early September 1863 they joined General Frederick Steele and his expedition against Little Rock. There they saw action at the Battle of Bayou Fourche where the Confederate forces under General Sterling Price were defeated and Union forces exercised control over most of Arkansas.

After the Little Rock expedition, the 126th was stationed at DeValls until August 1864. During this time they saw little combat and simply endured the monotony of daily life in the army. The lone action was some light skirmishing that occurred on June 25–26, 1864 at the tiny settlement of Clinton. The regiment spent the rest of the war in the vicinity of Pine Bluff in central Arkansas. After spending almost their entire service serving in a rear echelon role the 126th Illinois was mustered out of service on July 12, 1865 at Pine Bluff.

== Detailed service ==
Frederick H. Dyer in his Compendium of the War of the Rebellion wrote of the 126th Illinois: Duty at LaGrange, Tenn., till January, 1863. (6 Companies moved to Jackson, Tenn., December 19, 1862; thence moved to Humboldt, Tenn. R.R. crossing at Fork Deer River December 20. Action at Humboldt December 21.) 4 Companies on duty at Jackson, Tenn., and 6 Companies at Humboldt, Tenn., January to March 25; then at Jackson till May 25, 1863. Moved to Vicksburg, Miss., May 25–28. Siege of Vicksburg May 28 - July 4. Moved to Helena. Ark., July 24. Expedition against Little Rock, Ark., August 1 - September 10. Bayou Fourche and capture of Little Rock September 10. Moved to Duvall's Bluff October 24, and duty there till August 19, 1864. Action at Clinton June 25–26. Moved to Pine Bluff, Ark., August 19, and duty there till February 12, 1865. Scouts from Pine Bluff toward Camden and Monticello January 26–31. At mouth of White River, Ark., till June 12, and at Pine Bluff till July 12.

== Casualties ==
The regiment lost 6 men killed or mortally wounded, 4 officers and 192 enlisted men dying of disease for a total of 202 fatalities.

== Commanders ==
- Colonel Jonathan Richmond—resigned March 3, 1864
- Colonel Lucius W. Beal—mustered out with the regiment on July 12, 1865

== See also ==
- List of Illinois Civil War units
- Illinois in the Civil War
