= Dayes =

Dayes is a surname. Notable people with the surname include:

- Edward Dayes (1763–1804), English watercolour painter and engraver
- Hylton Dayes (born 1964), men's soccer coach at the University of Cincinnati
- Matthew Dayes (born 1994), American football player
- Yussef Dayes (born 1992), English jazz drummer, composer and record producer

== See also ==
- Day-Lewis
