= Judson Leroy Day =

American politician (1877–1944)

Judson Leroy Day (October 8, 1877 – September 14, 1944) was an American dentist and politician.

== Early life, education and career ==
Day was born on a farm in Castle Rock, Dakota County, Minnesota. He went to the Pillsbury Academy and to the University of Minnesota Dental School. He lived in Clinton Falls, Steele County, Minnesota with his wife and family and was a dentist. Day served in the Minnesota House of Representatives from 1931 to 1934. His brother Walter Edwin Day also served in the Minnesota House of Representatives.
