= James Plummer Day =

American farmer, educator, and politician

- Born: August 2, 1831; Allegheny County, Pennsylvania, U.S.
- Died: December 5, 1905 (aged 74); Grand Bay, Alabama, U.S.
- Resting place: Grand Bay Cemetery, Grand Bay, Alabama
- Other names: James P. Day, J.P. Day
- Office: Councilman, 6th District, Dakota Territory
- Term: 1885–1886
- Political party: Republican
- Board member of: Dakota Agricultural College at Brookings Board of Trustees
- Spouses: Elizabeth Hutchman; Catherine "Kittie" Graham; Helen Chollar
- Military career
- Allegiance: United States
- Branch: Union Army, Infantry
- Service years: 1862–1865
- Rank: Corporal
- Units: Company G, 126th Illinois Infantry Regiment
- Conflicts: American Civil War: Siege of Vicksburg

James Plummer Day (August 2, 1831 – December 5, 1905) was an American farmer, agricultural science and education advocate, and Dakota territorial politician. He served as a Councilman for the 16th Dakota Territorial Council in 1885, was a board member and president of the Dakota Agricultural College Board of Trustees, and was an American Civil War veteran.

== Early life ==
Day was born on August 2, 1831, the eldest of seven children of Abraham Day and Anne Plummer, in Tarentum, Pennsylvania / East Deer Township, Allegheny County, Pennsylvania, on the west bank of the Allegheny River near Pittsburg. Abraham's grandfather, Ezekial Day, was reported to be the first English settler in that part of Allegheny County. In 1856, James Day married Elizabeth Hutchman in the Hutchman family home in Bakerstown, Pennsylvania. Sometime before June 1856 Day's family moved to Coe Township, Rock Island County, Illinois.

== Civil War service ==
Several months after the death of his wife Elizabeth, Day enlisted in the Army in August 1862, serving with others from Coe Township in Company G, 126th Illinois Infantry Regiment. He was quickly appointed to Corporal. He participated in its actions in the western theater, including the siege of Vicksburg in July 1863. On 12 July 1865, he mustered out of the Army at Pine Bluff, Arkansas.

Day's name is among the 36,325 names engraved on the walls of the Illinois Memorial at Vicksburg National Military Park.

== Career ==
After the Civil war, Day returned to his farm in Coe Township, Rock Island County, Illinois. Day and his wife Kittie successfully farmed in Rock Island County for several years, and was active in local politics, the local grange, and a local farmers insurance company. In 1881, they moved to Spink County, Dakota Territory. There he organized a Farmer's organization and served on the County Grange.

Day built up his farm about three miles south of Mellette, Dakota Territory, near the James River.

== Public service in Dakota Territory ==
In 1884, Day ran unopposed on the Republican ticket for Territorial Councilman (roughly equivalent to a state senator) for the Sixth District of the Dakota Legislature. Winning handily, Day and J.H. Westover served as Dakota 6th District's Councilmen on the 16th Territorial Council, which met in the new capitol of Bismarck for 60 days in Jan-Mar 1885. Two legislative proposals during the 16th Legislative Session are noteworthy: the aftermath of the so-called Spink County War, and Women's Suffrage.

The Spink County War was a dispute between Old Ashton and Redfield for the County Seat. In December 1884, after the November vote to move the county seat to Redfield, county records were taken at night from the Old Ashton County Courthouse and moved to Redfield. An armed confrontation between the men of Old Ashton and the men of Redfield ensued, while legal challenges were ongoing within the circuit court. Upon the request of the County Sheriff, Governor Pierce called up a company of the Dakota Territory Militia and dispatched them to Spink County to maintain the peace., In reaction to the Spink County War, several legislative proposals were submitted a month later, in January 1885, to the 16th Territorial Legislature. One was a requirement for Spink County to repay the Territory for the costs of calling up the militia. Most controversial was a legislative proposal to split Spink County and Beadle County to its south into three counties. This proposal was strongly opposed by many Spink and Beadle County citizens, including threats of physical violence sent to Councilman Day and Representative Miller. The legislative proposal to split the counties was ultimately rejected, but also resulted in a strongly worded concurrent Joint Statement by the Territorial Council and House of Representatives denouncing those who threatened their political representatives with physical violence.

The 16th Territorial Legislature also saw an early attempt to grant women the right to vote. House Bill 71, submitted by Major John Pickler of Faulkton was hotly debated, and after approval by the House of Representatives, passed the Territorial Council by a vote of 14 to 10. Councilman Day was one of the 14 voting Aye. When submitted to Governor Pierce for his signature, H.B.71 was vetoed and returned to the House of Representatives. Major Pickler’s attempt to overturn Governor Pierce's veto. was unsuccessful.

Upon the completion the 16th Dakota Territorial Legislature session, on 13 March 1885, Governor Gilbert Pierce appointed Day to the Dakota Agricultural College Board of Trustees. In 1890, Day was reappointed to the board of trustees by the newly formed South Dakota Board of Regents. He was elected as President of the Board of Trustees, serving in this capacity until his resignation 7 Sep 1892.

== Personal life ==
Day was married three times. His first wife, Elizabeth Hutchman, died in 1862, prior to his Army service. After the Civil War, J.P Day met Catherine "Kittie" Graham, and they married in Dixon, Illinois in October 1865. Together they raised six children. Due to Kittie's poor health, in late 1892 they moved from Mellette, South Dakota, to Grand Bay, Alabama, where Kittie survived another two years. In 1899, Day married his third wife, Helen Chollar.

== Death ==
Day died in Grand Bay, Alabama, on 5 December 1905, aged 74.
