= Alice T. Days =

American director and writer

Alice T. Day is an American director and writer known for her film Scarred Lands and Wounded Lives, which she directed with her husband Lincoln H. Day. She is also known for extensive world peace organization work and work within the sociological field.

== Biography ==
Day was born in New York. She studied at Smith College, where she received a Bachelor of Arts,. She went on to attend Columbia University, where she received a Master of Arts degree in sociology, and the Australian National University, where she received a PhD. Day has served as a Hofstee Fellow at The Hague and was the director of an Australian federal government project entitled Successful Aging, A.C.T. during the 1990s. She is currently a board member of Council for a Livable World, a non-profit organization against nuclear weapons in the United States, as well as a member of the Center for Arms Control and Non-Proliferation.

Day met her husband while attending Columbia University. The two of them have worked on many different projects together including books and the film Scarred Lands and Wounded Lives. They are both dual citizens of Australia and America and have done extensive traveling throughout the entire world in pursuit of sociological research.

== Selected bibliography ==
=== Books ===
- Too Many Americans (1964, with Lincoln H. Day)
- Family Size in Industrialized Countries: an Inquiry Into the Social-cultural Determinants of Levels of Childbearing (1969, with Lincoln H. Day)
- We Can Manage - Expectations About Care and Varieties of Family Support Among Persons 75 Years of Age and Over (1985, with Lincoln H. Day)
- Remarkable Survivors - Insights into Successful Aging Among Women (1991, Urban Institute Press)

=== Articles ===
- "The Modern Rise of Population" (1977, American Scientist)
- "Women and the challenge of long life : report on a survey, For women over 60" (1984)
- "Developments in Kinship Support Networks for the Aged in the Netherlands" (1989, Population Studies)
- "Living Arrangements and ‘Successful’ Ageing among Ever-Married American White Women 77–87 Years of Age" (1993, Ageing and Society, with Lincoln H. Day)
- "Endangered by Science?" (1986, American Scientist)

== Scarred Lands & Wounded Lives ==
In 2008, the Days released the documentary Scarred Lands & Wounded Lives. The film uses on-site and archival footage and examines how war and its preparations can cause detrimental change to the environment and natural resources. This includes expert analysis on various wars throughout history and involves several examples of how the creating of munitions for example can cause environmental pollution. Critical reviews for the film have been positive, as reviewers felt that while the documentary's topic might be depressing for some that viewers would "come away knowing a whole lot more than [they] ever wanted to about war's impact on the environment-and that's just one of the reasons [that they] should watch it."

The film was also shown in 2010 at the FILManthropy festival "Open Your Eyes Program." The film aired at 9:00am on October 3 of the festival and was in association with Fund for Sustainable Tomorrows.

== Remarkable Survivors: Insights into Successful Aging among Women by Alice T. Day ==
In a review by Elizabeth A. Kutza, the reviewer says the book's "strength comes from the longitudinal nature of its data as well as in its blending of qualitative and quantitative approach to issues." The review discusses how Alice used information gathered from 1000 older women in order to identify a pattern between these women. Personal interviews were conducted with 20 of the women used to gather the research findings and all of it was used to make the final product.

=== Awards and nominations ===
- Earth Award at the Cinema Verde Film Festival (2008, won)
- Best Environmental Documentary at the Chagrin Documentary Film Festival (2012, won)
- Best Environmental Feature at the Columbia Gorge Film Festival (2012, won)
- Best Documentary Feature at the California Independent Film Festival (2012, won)
