= Jimmy Holmes (footballer, born 1908) =

English footballer

Personal information
- Full name: James Holmes
- Date of birth: 27 December 1908
- Place of birth: Skelmersdale, England
- Date of death: 1 November 1971 (aged 62)
- Place of death: Chesterfield, England
- Height: 5 ft 11 1/2 in (1.82 m)
- Position: Defender

Youth career
- Prescot Cables

Senior career*
Years	Team	Apps	(Gls)
1930–1931	Chesterfield		
1931–1936	Sheffield United	135	(0)
1936–1937	West Ham		
1937–1940	Reading		
1940	→ Chesterfield (guest)	2	(0)
- * Club domestic league appearances and goals

James Holmes (27 December 1908 – 1 November 1971) was an English footballer who played as a defender.

Born in Skelmersdale, Lancashire, Holmes had trial spells with both Liverpool and Wigan Borough in 1925 but was an employed as a miner and playing for local side Prescot Cables when he was spotted by Chesterfield in 1930. Signed by Chesterfield in May of that year, Holmes remained with the Derbyshire club for just one season before being signed by Division One side Sheffield United in May 1931 for £1,750.

Making his debut for United in October 1931 in an away fixture at Manchester City, Holmes became a regular in the Blades defence for the next four years. Holmes was regarded as a robust and tough tackling defender with a fiery temper, highlighted when a referee ruled out a goal Holmes had scored, only for the defender to pick up the official and "shake him like a dog would a rat" according to press reports. Having missed very few fixtures, Holmes was sidelined by injury at the start of the 1935–36 season and was replaced by Tom Johnson. Despite Holmes regaining his fitness, Johnson's impressive form meant that by December 1935 he was firmly established as first choice, resulting in Holmes making only occasional appearances from then on.

In May 1936 Holmes moved to West Ham United for £750 where he played for a season, before joining Reading in July 1937. Holmes remained with the club following the onset of World War II, but having made two guest appearances for his former club Chesterfield in 1940, he retired from playing and returned to his former profession as a miner.
