= South West Heritage Trust =

The South West Heritage Trust is a charity which was formed in 2014. It is involved in the preservation and management of the heritage of Somerset and Devon.

In 2014 the trust took over the management of local archives for the Devon Record Offices and Somerset Archives and Local Studies.

The trust is also responsible for three local museums: The Rural Life Museum in Glastonbury, the Museum of Somerset in Taunton and The Brick and Tile Museum in Bridgwater. Workshops and resources are also available to local schools.

Courses are provided which include those on searching family history and reading old handwriting. Archaeological advice on planning applications are provided for local county and district councils.
