= Edward Davis (bushranger) =

Australian convict and bushranger

Edward Davis (1816–1841) was an Australia convict turned bushranger. His real name is not certain, but in April 1832 he was convicted under the name George Wilkinson for attempting to steal a wooden till and copper coins to the total value of 7 shillings. Sentenced to seven years transportation, he arrived in Sydney on the Camden in 1833 and was placed in the Hyde Park Barracks. Over the next few years he escaped four times: on 23 December 1833 from the Barracks, on 1 December 1835 from Penrith, on 10 January 1837 from the farmer he had been assigned to, and for a final time on 21 July 1838.

In the summer of 1839 he formed a bushranger gang of escaped convicts which roamed in New South Wales, from Maitland to the New England Highway, in the Hunter Region, and down to Brisbane Water near Gosford. They had a main hideout at Pilcher's Mountain, near Dungog. The gang members gained a Robin Hood like reputation, for supposedly giving some of the plunder of the wealthy to their assigned convict servants, and for adopting a gallant air and flamboyant dress, and tying pink ribbons to their horses' bridles. Davis instructed his gang that violence was only permissible in order to escape capture, but in December 1840 a store keeper's clerk was killed by gang member John Shea in the course of a robbery at Scone (Davis was elsewhere in the town at the time). Davis immediately retreated with the gang to a hideout at Doughboy Hollow at Murrurundi, but they were surprised by a posse that had followed them. In the shootout, Davis was wounded in the shoulder. Davis, John Everett, John Shea, Robert Chitty, James Bryant and John Marshall were captured, Richard Glanvill escaped.

They stood trial in the Supreme Court in Sydney, Shea charged with murder and the others with aiding and abetting Shea. They were all found guilty by a jury and condemned to death by Chief Justice Sir James Dowling. There was public sympathy for Davis with many appealing for a reprieve, but the Executive Council confirmed the sentence. Davis was hanged on 16 March 1841. Davis was a Jew, and was referred to later as "Teddy the Jewboy". He was assisted at his execution by the reader of the Sydney synagogue and buried in the Jewish portion of the Sydney Devonshire Street Cemetery.

In June 1995, an opera based on the life of Davis, Teddy the Jewboy, by poet and composer Chris Mann, was performed in Brisbane.

== See also ==
- List of convicts transported to Australia
