= Dennis Day (artist) =

Canadian artist

- Born: 1960 (age 64–65); Grand Falls, Newfoundland
- Known for: video artist

Dennis Day (born 1960) is a Canadian artist known for his video works.

Day is known for his video works Oh Nothing, Autobiography, Heaven or Montreal: The Unfinished Video and This Narrative is Killing Me, among others. In 1997, Day received the Bulloch award for Best Canadian Film for Heaven or Montreal: The Unfinished Video at the Toronto LGBT Film Festival. Day's work is included in the collection of the Museum of Modern Art and the National Gallery of Canada.
