= William Day (divine) =

English cleric and biblical commentator

William Day (c.1605–1684) was an English cleric and biblical commentator.

== Life ==
The brother of Matthew Day, D.D., he was a native of Windsor, Berkshire, and received his education at Eton College. He was elected in 1624 to King's College, Cambridge, of which he became a Fellow (B.A. 1628-9, M.A. 1632). In 1635 he was incorporated M.A. at Oxford, and in 1637 he was presented by Eton College to the vicarage of Mapledurham, Oxfordshire.

He complied with all the changes of government from 1637 to the Restoration, keeping his vicarage. He was also made divinity reader in his majesty's chapel of St. George in Windsor Castle.

== Works ==
Day published:

- An Exposition of the Book of the Prophet Isaiah, London 1654.
- A Paraphrase and Commentary upon the Epistle of St. Paul to the Romans, London 1666.
