= Henry Noble Day =

American philosopher (1808–1890)

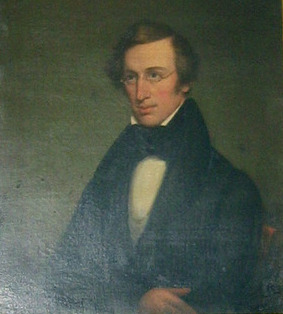
- Born: August 4, 1808; New Preston, Connecticut, U.S.
- Died: January 12, 1890 (aged 81); New Haven, Connecticut, U.S.
- Education: Yale University
- Occupation: Philosopher
- Spouse: Jane Louisa (m. 1836)
- Children: 3
- Relatives: Jeremiah Day (uncle)

Henry Noble Day (August 4, 1808 – January 12, 1890) was an American philosopher.

Day, the second son of Col. Noble and Elizabeth (Jones) Day, and nephew of Yale President Jeremiah Day, was born in the village of New Preston, in Washington, Connecticut, August 4, 1808.

He graduated from Yale College in 1828. After having taught for nearly two years in Burlington, N. J., and having begun the study of law in Philadelphia, he was appointed tutor in Yale in 1831. He continued in that office for three years, taking at the same time the full course in the Yale Divinity School. After fifteen months' travel in Europe he was ordained pastor of the First Congregational church in Waterbury, Conn., on November 9, 1836.

He resigned this charge, October 1, 1840, to accept the chair of Sacred Rhetoric in Western Reserve College, at Hudson, Ohio. He remained in connection with that institution until 1858, the title of his professorship for the last fourteen years being Practical Theology. During his residence in Hudson he took a leading part in the endeavor to obtain a railroad connection with Pittsburgh and Cleveland. In 1858 his interest in the higher education of women induced him to accept the presidency of the Ohio Female College, at College Hill, in the suburbs of Cincinnati.

After a successful administration of six years, he resigned and removed to New Haven as the most attractive place for the literary work to which he proposed to devote himself. He had already published several volumes, beginning with The Art of Elocution, in 1844. His Art of Rhetoric, a much approved text-book, first appeared in 1850. During the quarter of a century after his return to New Haven his pen was continually busy, and his separate publications in book form (ending with a volume on The Science of Education in 1889) number about twenty. The degree of Doctor of Laws was conferred on him by Iowa State University in 1877.

He died in New Haven, from an attack of influenza, resulting in pleurisy, on January 12, 1890, in the 82nd year of his age.

He married, April 27, 1836, Jane Louisa, daughter of Simeon Marble, of New Haven, who survived him with one son and two daughters.

This article incorporates public domain material from the 1890 Yale Obituary Record.
