= Frances Sally Day =

British artist, photographer (1815–1892)

Frances Sally Day (1815–1892) was an English miniature portrait painter and photographer who lived in London. Her paintings were displayed annually for twenty years at the Royal Academy of Arts' annual exhibitions. She was the first woman known to photograph Queen Victoria.

== Personal life and painting ==
She was the eldest daughter of Frances Rachel Day and Hamilton Smith Day, a portrait painter and photographer. She was born on 15 September 1815 and baptised at St Giles in the Fields, Holborn, on 4 February 1816. At that time, her parents were living at 38 Wellesley Street, St Pancras. Frances Sally Day had well over forty portraits and miniatures accepted for Royal Academy exhibitions between 1838 and 1858. One portrait was of Sheikh Ali Bin Nasser “envoy from his Highness the Imaum of Muscat” who had sent a ship full of gifts to the Queen. Another portrait was praised for its “brilliant handling of flesh tones”. In 1840 Day won the Silver Isis Medal of the Royal Society of Arts for a “portrait bust”.

Until the mid-1850s she gave her address to the Royal Academy as 41 Camden Street, as did her father who had three portraits shown. Her address from 1856 to 1858 was 14 Piccadilly, an address used for the family photography business of Hamilton Smith Day & Son, but she was living elsewhere in 1861, the year when a partnership with three photographer siblings - Louisa, Thomas and Arthur - was dissolved “so far as regards T. Day”. In 1871 she was living with two sisters, a brother and a nephew, all artists according to the census, at 46 Albemarle Street, the address where her father had died the previous year.

== Photography ==
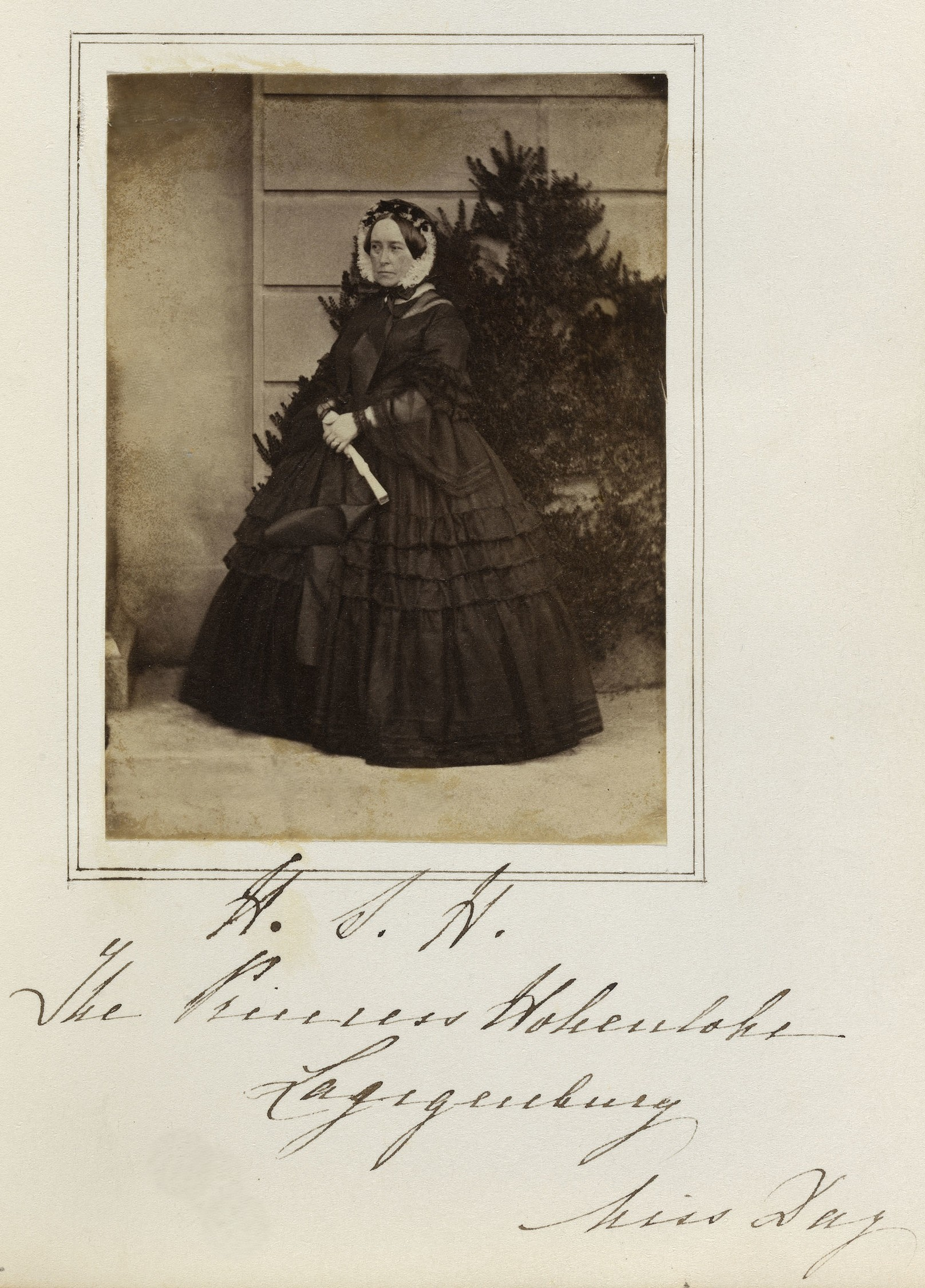
Photograph of Feodore, Princess Hohenlohe-Langenburg taken at Osborne House by Frances Sally Day

Day was active in photography by 1853. In that year she wrote to the leading photographer Henry Fox Talbot reminding him she had already asked him to be “so kind to inform her whether a license was necessary for taking Talbotype portraits on paper, and if so what are the terms for permission”.

There are various surviving photographs of royalty taken by Day in the late 1850s. Records exist of a session at Osborne House on the Isle of Wight on 26 July 1859 when Queen Victoria wrote in her diary, “was photographed in the Lower Terrace by Miss Day and together with Mama and the children”. This was the first time a woman had photographed the Queen. Some of Day's photographs were sent to royal relatives abroad, probably in the form of cartes de visite, while ten went into a royal photograph album. Some were copied and turned into etchings. Margaret Homans suggests that some of Day's photographs of Victoria and Albert together show them with quite a casual "democratic" look and yet the image chosen for public circulation suggests more of a "worshipful wife" role for the Queen where "she gazes up at him [Albert] intensely".

Frances Sally Day died on 12 January 1892 leaving an estate of about £2500.
