= Walter Edwin Day =

American politician (1880–1969)

Walter Edwin Day (May 31, 1880 – December 14, 1969) was an American politician, school teacher, and farmer.

Day was born in Castle Rock, Dakota County, Minnesota and graduated from the Pillsbury Academy in 1900. He lived in Bagley, Clearwater County, Minnesota with his wife and family and was a farmer. Day was also involved in the cooperative movement. He served in the Minnesota House of Representatives from 1919 to 1934 and from 1937 to 1960. Day died at Bethesda Hospital in Crookston, Minnesota. His funeral and burial was in Bagley, Minnesota. His brother Judson Leroy Day also served in the Minnesota House of Representatives.
