= Frank R. Day =

American politician

Frank R. Day (1853–1899) was an entrepreneur in Los Angeles and Monterey, California, in the late 19th century and was a member of the governing bodies of both cities. He was chief of the Los Angeles volunteer fire department.

== Personal ==
=== Family ===
Day was born in South Bend, Indiana, on April 9, 1853, the son of Lott Day of Ohio and Anna Wright of Pennsylvania. She died at the age of 33, leaving her husband, young Frank and two daughters.

Frank came with his family to California in 1866, and his father bought the Capitol Hotel in Sacramento. The younger Day moved to Los Angeles in 1883.

Day was married twice. At his death he was survived by his first wife, Elizabeth Mappa of Los Angeles, and 18-year-old daughter, Anna O., in Los Angeles and his second wife, Jessie Oliver of Monterey, California, and 2-year-old child in San Francisco.

=== Death ===
Day committed suicide in June 1899 when he sealed his room in the Van Dyke lodging house at 330 McAllister Street, San Francisco, and turned on all the gas jets. He left a note stating: "If my body is found, tell my friends at Wells, Fargo & Co. to bury me at Mountain View Cemetery, Oakland. My father, Loth [sic] Day, and mother, Celine Day, are buried there."

Of him, the San Francisco Call said:

" Having run through two moderate fortunes, having become divorced from two wives by reason of his dissipated habits, . . . Frank R. Day . . . ended his life with the hand of a suicide. . . . Day was a clever man, of good education, a pleasing address and a faculty for making friends. When not under the influence of liquor he was a charming companion and numbered among his friends many persons of considerable influence. . . . By the death of his father Day inherited considerable property, . . . but he ran through it in a short time..

== Vocation ==
Day learned civil engineering in California and worked for the Pacific Improvement Company for a time. Over a twenty-year period he also worked for the Southern Pacific and other railroad companies and for Wells Fargo & Company. He moved to Los Angeles in 1883 and, with Jim Ash, ran the restaurant at the Palace Hotel, at 113 North Main Street and 110 North Spring Street, Los Angeles in the late 1880s. He organized and was connected with "the well-known business firm of Joe Bayer & Co."

In 1886, he sold his business interests in Los Angeles but remained in the Fire Department there (below).

Day was an organizer and director of the first telephone company in Los Angeles and after he moved to Monterey he was "an organizer of, a heavy stockholder in, and manager of the Monterey Electric Light & Development Company."

In 1897 he was conducting a saloon in Monterey, and afterward he worked as a clerk at the Wells Fargo office in San Francisco until shortly before his death.

== Public service ==
=== Los Angeles ===
==== Common Council ====
Day was elected to represent the 2nd Ward, "one of the wealthiest wards in the city," on the Los Angeles Common Council on December 4, 1882, was reelected the next year and served until December 10, 1885.

In November 1885 Day argued against a motion made by Councilman Hiram Sinsabaugh that a picture of a nude woman hanging "at the lower end of the council chamber" be removed. He said the canvas was a "work of art. belong to Conference [fire] Engine Company, and had been on exhibition in Preuss A. Piroul's window for four months." The council nevertheless ordered it taken down.

==== Fire chief ====
On March 7, 1885, "the fire delegates" elected Day as chief of the volunteer fire department. The Common Council, with member Day absent from the meeting, received the report and filed it on March 24. It was said that Day was the first chief of the fire department when it became a paid department instead of a volunteer force.

He resigned in January 1886, with a message to the Common Council that he could no longer serve because he would be "out of the city a good deal of the time."

=== Monterey ===
He was a member of the Monterey Town Council in 1893.

== References and notes ==
Access to the Los Angeles Times links may require the use of a library card.
