= Day (automobile) =

Defunct American motor vehicle manufacturer

The Day Utility was an American automobile manufactured in Detroit, Michigan by the Day Automobile Company from 1911 to 1914. The Day used a four-cylinder, 30 hp (22 kW) engine and shaft drive. Removal of the rear seat and doors allowed the car to be converted from a five-seater touring car to a light truck in one minute. As a truck, the Day was able to carry up to 1,000 lb (450 kg) in a 36-inch (910 mm) by 96-inch (2,400 mm) cargo space. The rear seat could be lifted away by triggering two spring locks. The Day had an advertised price of US$950.

Year	Engine	HP	Wheelbase
1911	4-cylinder	21	100 in (2,540 mm)
1912	4-cylinder	26	110 in (2,794 mm)
1913	4-cylinder	33	115 in (2,921 mm)
