= Albert Day (Welsh footballer) =

Welsh footballer

Personal information
- Full name: Albert Ernest Day
- Place of birth: Cardiff, Wales
- Position: Right winger

Senior career*
Years	Team	Apps	(Gls)
1937–1939	Cardiff City	0	(0)
1938–1939	→ Torquay United (loan)	20	(2)
1939	Torquay United	3	(0)
- * Club domestic league appearances and goals

Albert Ernest Day was a Welsh professional footballer.

Day began his career with Cardiff City but was unable to break into the first team. He joined Torquay United on loan during the 1938–39 season as a replacement for Roy Fursdon. Day made his league debut for Torquay on 24 December 1938 in a 4–1 defeat away to Northampton Town and was a regular until the end of the season. Day scored twice that season, the first securing a 1–1 draw with Aldershot on 14 January, the second was Torquay's second in a 5–3 win away to Reading on 11 March, Torquay's other goals coming from Ralph Allen, Frank Preskett and Andy Brown as well as an own goal from Reading's Jim Holmes. He also played three times in the Division Three (South) Cup as Torquay made the final which was never played.

Day left Cardiff to join Torquay at the end of that season. He began the following season as a regular, but his career was curtailed by the Second World War.
