= Heather Day =

American painter

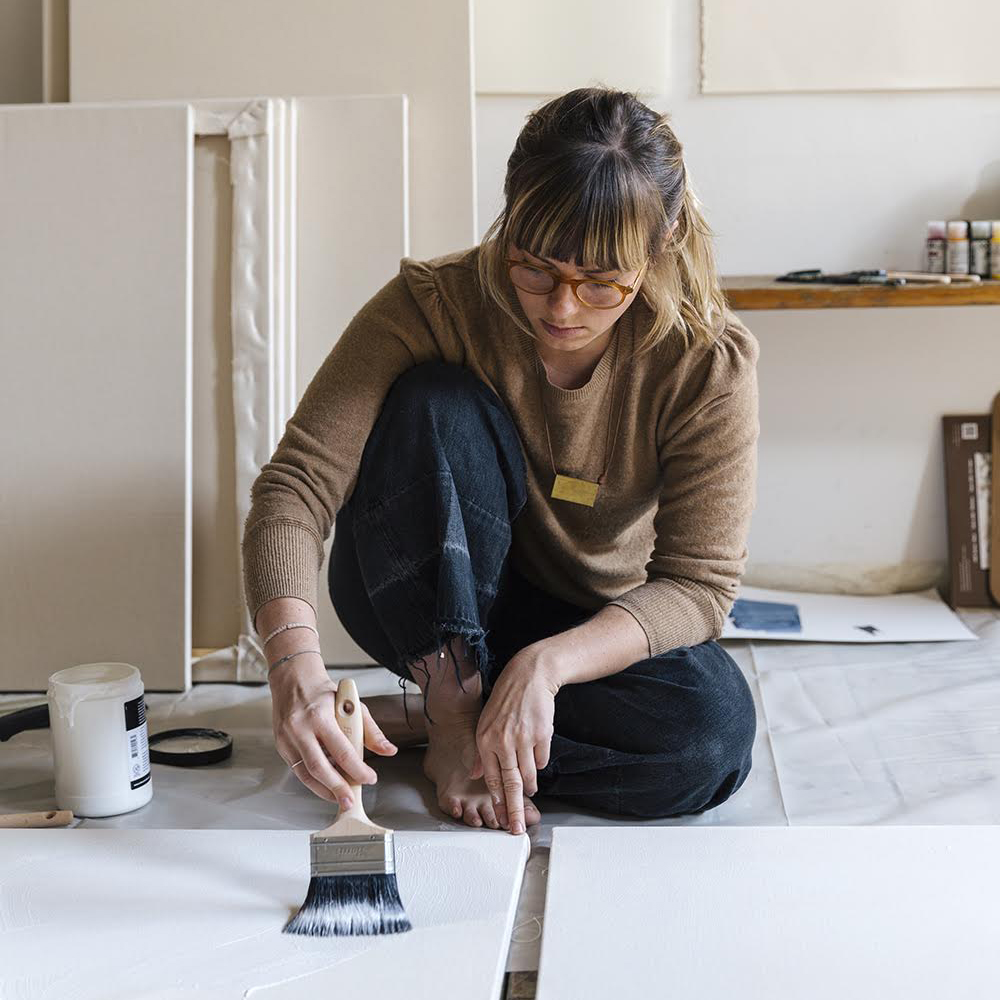
- Heather Day photographed in 2017.
- Born: Ewa Beach, Hawaii
- Education: Maryland Institute College of Art
- Style: Abstract expressionism
- Website: http://www.heatherday.com/

Heather Day is an American artist based in California.

== Career ==
Heather Day grew up in Hawaii and along the East Coast of the United States. She graduated from the Maryland Institute College of Art in 2012 with a Bachelor of Fine Arts degree in Painting. Following graduation, she moved to San Francisco to expand her studio practice. Day now lives and works in Southern California.

== Work ==
Day considers her work a form of visual storytelling, where each painting acts as a page to a larger story about “risk and comfort.” Her paintings primarily consist of paint and mixed media on canvas.

Aside from working with traditional painting materials, Day used her process to create the world's first augmented reality art for Facebook Camera in collaboration with Facebook's Applied Machine Learning group.

Her work is included in the collection of the Fort Wayne Museum of Art.
