= Paul William Day =

Paul William Day (born in Brisbane, Australia) is the producer and director of Angel Studios located in Brisbane Australia.

== Career ==
=== Film ===
Day wrote and directed the sci-fi space feature film Redemption 101 (2007), which premiered at the Schonell Theatre in St Lucia, Queensland and was then released on DVD. His latest film, the prequel Beyond Redemption (The Visitor), in which he reprised his acting role as "Captain Lazlo", premiered at the Gold Coast Film Festival 2012. The third film in the series, Beyond Redemption: Space Captain premiered in August 2014. Started working on a medieval feature film, Magdala Rose, in 2015, which was completed in late 2019.

=== Music ===
Paul Day has been active in the music industry for many years, releasing an album Precious Love in 1999 with the band "Soul Purpose" also based in Brisbane. The members of Soul Purpose are Paul Day (guitar, keyboard vocals), Will Kellar (bass), and Katrina Maffey (drums). This band now records mostly soundtracks and is currently working on releasing another original album. Paul's first professional band was called Cyandra, a 4-piece band consisting of Paul Day (bass, guitar, vocals), Steve Fredericks - deceased (rhythm guitar, lead vocals), Arthur Bray (guitar, bass, vocals) and Jon Francis (drums).
