= James Milford Day =

- Born: 11 May 1815; Anderson County, South Carolina, US
- Died: 22 October 1894 (aged 79); Gillespie County, Texas
- Military career
- Allegiance: The Republic of Texas, United States
- Branch: Seguin-Gonzales Rangers, Republic of Texas Militia, United States Army
- Service years: 1839–1847
- Rank: Private
- Conflicts: Battleground Prairie Battle of Plum Creek; Battle of Salado Creek Mexican American War

James Milford Day (11 May 1815 – 22 October 1894) was a 19th-century Texas military figure. He was a member of Mathew Caldwell's and Jack Hay's Seguin Rangers and a participant in the Mexican–American War.

== Early life and family ==
James Milford Day was born May 11, 1815, in Anderson County, South Carolina. He was the son of Johnson Day and Sarah Hembree. Day accompanied his parents and siblings to Texas in 1835 and became part of the Runaway Scrape, that preceded Sam Houston's march to the battle of San Jacinto in 1836. When returning, the Johnson Day and George Nichols families met Henry B. King and John R. King along with a group bound for Texas near St. Augustine. With the same destination agreed upon, the three groups decided it safer to travel together. The troop arrived at Gonzales, Texas on October 6, 1837. Misfortune hit the Day family in Gonzales, when the father was killed in 1838. That same year, James Milford Day married Martha Nichols and they had 2 children. A third child died along with Martha during birth. Day's Mother would help raise and care for the children.

== Career in Texas ==
In 1838, Day became one of the founders of Walnut Springs, a new town in Gonzales County, Texas. During this time, he moved his mother into an adobe built home in his new town. Day would join Mathew Caldwell's Gonzales–Seguin Rangers in 1839. Caldwell stationed half of his men in the town, to protect the new settlers of the upcoming town. The Day home site would be used extensively by the Rangers and become known as the Seguin Ranger Station.

== Texas Republic Ranger ==
On March 29, 1839, a company of 80 men commanded by General Edward Burleson had defeated Vicente Córdova and his rebels during a battle near Seguin, Texas, at "Battleground Prairie". Córdova survived, but was pursued by Caldwell's Rangers, Seguin militia and members of the Henry Karnes company, thus insuring his departure from Texas. While Day and his company were scouting and camped on the Guadalupe River, he was surprised by Cordova's fleeing company. Although holding their own, he was severely wounded but survived. It was here he would suffer an injury that impaired his ability to walk for the rest of his life. Day was a participant in the battle of Plum Creek on August 12, 1840. On September 18, 1842, Day fought at the battle of Salado Creek. During the war with Mexico, Day served in 1846 and 1847 in Captain McCulloch's Company.

== Later life ==
Day would remarry twice. After the death of his wives, he would move to Gillespie County in 1879 to be near his son. There he died October 22, 1894.

== Legacy ==
In 2011, a historic marker was placed at the site of the old Walnut Branch Ranger Station in Seguin. The old 1820s adobe structure had stood for almost 200 years and was due for recognition and restoration, when it was razed in about 2000. A brief message on the marker tells of the Day's contributions to the birth of Texas.

== Citations ==
- Gesick, E. John (1995), Under the Live Oak Tree: A History of Seguin, Seguin, Texas: Tommy Brown Printing
- Hardin, Stephen L. (1994), Texian Iliad – A Military History of the Texas Revolution, Austin, Texas: University of Texas Press, ISBN 0-292-73086-1, OCLC 29704011
- Moore, Stephen L. (2006), Savage Frontier: Rangers, Riflemen, and Indian Wars in Texas, Volume II, 1838-1839, Denton, Texas: University of North Texas Press, ISBN 1-57441-206-X
- Moore, Stephen L. (2007), Savage Frontier: 1840-1841, Volume III, Denton, Texas: University of North Texas Press, ISBN 978-1-57441-229-1
- Moore, Stephen L. (2010), Savage Frontier: Rangers, Riflemen, and Indian Wars in Texas, Volume IV, Denton, Texas: University of North Texas Press, ISBN 978-1-57441-294-9
