= Harold Day (Australian footballer) =

Australian rules footballer

Personal information
- Full name: Harold Day
- Born: 22 May 1890; Brunswick, Victoria
- Died: 8 June 1961 (aged 71); Kew, Victoria

Playing career^{1}
Years	Club	Games (Goals)
1915	Essendon	1 (1)
- ^{1} Playing statistics correct to the end of 1915.

Harold Day (22 May 1890 – 8 June 1961) was an Australian rules footballer who played with Essendon in the Victorian Football League (VFL).
