= James G. Day =

American judge (1835–1898)

James Day

Justice of the Iowa Supreme Court
- In office September 1, 1870 – December 31, 1883

Personal details
- Born: 1835
- Died: 1898 (aged 62–63)

James G. Day (1835–1898) was a justice of the Iowa Supreme Court from September 1, 1870, to December 31, 1883, appointed from Fremont County, Iowa.

Political offices
Preceded by	Justice of the Iowa Supreme Court; 1870–1883	Succeeded by
