= Bert Day (footballer, born 1894) =

Australian rules footballer

Personal information
- Full name: Albert Ernest Day
- Born: 29 March 1894; Brighton, Victoria
- Died: 23 April 1949 (aged 55); South Melbourne, Victoria
- Original team: Mordialloc
- Height: 178 cm (5 ft 10 in)
- Weight: 79 kg (174 lb)

Playing career^{1}
Years	Club	Games (Goals)
1914–1921	Essendon	68 (0)
- ^{1} Playing statistics correct to the end of 1921.

Albert Ernest Day (29 March 1894 – 23 April 1949) was an Australian rules footballer who played as fullback for the Essendon Football Club in the Victorian Football League (VFL).

He debuted late in 1914 and quickly established himself in the team, playing every game in 1915. After a two-year break due to World War I, Day returned in 1918 and again played every game that year. He was regarded as one of the leading fullbacks in the immediate post-war period, and represented Victoria in this position in 1920.
