= Bert Day (footballer, born 1900) =

Australian rules footballer

Personal information
- Full name: Bert Day
- Born: 13 March 1900
- Died: 25 August 1964 (aged 64)
- Original team: North Adelaide
- Height: 175 cm (5 ft 9 in)
- Weight: 73 kg (161 lb)

Playing career^{1}
Years	Club	Games (Goals)
1924–1927	St Kilda	25 (1)
- ^{1} Playing statistics correct to the end of 1927.

Bert Day (13 March 1900 – 25 August 1964) was an Australian rules footballer who played for the St Kilda Football Club in the Victorian Football League (VFL).
