= James Day (cricketer) =

English cricketer

Personal information
- Full name: James John Day
- Born: 8 February 1850; Holborn, Middlesex, England
- Died: 19 February 1895 (aged 45); Battersea, London, England
- Batting: Unknown

Career statistics
Competition	First-class
Matches	3
Runs scored	1
Batting average	0.33
100s/50s	–/–
Top score	1
Catches/stumpings	2/–
- Source: Cricinfo, 30 August 2019

James John Day (8 February 1850 – 19 February 1895) was an English first-class cricketer.

Day was born at Holborn in February 1850. Day made his debut in first-class cricket for the Gentlemen of the South against the Gentlemen of the North at Beeston in 1870. The following year he made two appearances for W. G. Grace's personal XI in two fixtures against Kent in 1871, at Maidstone and Gravesend. Day batted on three innings during his brief first-class career, scoring a single run and being dismissed without scoring on two occasions. Day died at Battersea in February 1895.
