= Alf Day (Australian footballer) =

Australian rules footballer

Personal information
- Full name: Alfred James Day
- Born: 19 May 1884; Geelong, Victoria
- Died: 3 July 1968 (aged 84); Prahran, Victoria
- Original team: Corio

Playing career^{1}
Years	Club	Games (Goals)
1907	Geelong	7 (1)
- ^{1} Playing statistics correct to the end of 1907.

Alfred James Day (19 May 1884 – 3 July 1968) was an Australian rules footballer who played for the Geelong Football Club in the Victorian Football League (VFL).
