= Arthur Day (Australian cricketer) =

Australian cricketer

Personal information
- Full name: Arthur Charles Day
- Born: 8 August 1933; Melbourne, Australia
- Died: 15 July 2022 (aged 88); Queenscliff, Victoria, Australia
- Batting: Right-handed
- Bowling: Left-arm fast-medium

Domestic team information
- Years: Team
- 1955–1957: Victoria

Career statistics
Competition	First-class
Matches	4
Runs scored	22
Batting average	11.00
100s/50s	0/0
Top score	16
Balls bowled	776
Wickets	11
Bowling average	22.90
5 wickets in innings	0
10 wickets in match	0
Best bowling	3/39
Catches/stumpings	1/–
- Source: Cricinfo, 3 January 2023

Arthur Charles Day (8 August 1933 – 15 July 2022) was an Australian cricketer. He played four first-class cricket matches for Victoria between 1955 and 1957.

== See also ==
- List of Victoria first-class cricketers
