= James Day (poet) =

English poet

James Day (fl. 1637) was an English verse-writer whose name and writings are but little known.

== Works ==
James Day was the author of a 1637 volume of devotional verse, entitled A New Spring of Divine Poetrie, 4to, with an acrostic dedication "To Mistris Bridget Rudge" and commendatory verses by H. G. and T. J. This little volume, perhaps the sole production of his poetical muse, consists of 48 pages, and of divers poems. The first is "The World's Metamorphosis"; it describes the creation of the earth. The second is "Christ's Birth and Passion". These are followed by some shorter poems, which, according to Arthur Henry Bullen, "have more conceit than elegance".

F. W. Fairholt calls the work "A thin quarto of melancholy morality and pointless attempts at religious wit, after the fashion of Quarles." For example, he ends his "Meditation on a Windmill" with the lines—

Lord drive me with thy spirit, then Ile be
Thy windmill, and will grind a grist for thee.

== Identity ==
Though only J. Day is on his title-page, that the author's name was James appears by one of the commendatory verses prefixed by H. G. From the commendatory verses it appears that the book was a youthful production.

I could admire thee, James, and though in truth
The downy characters of blooming youth
Scarce write thee man, yet, if we measure yeares
By vertue, thou a Nestor will appeare.

== Sources ==
- Bullen, Arthur Henry (1888). "Day, James" . In Stephen, Leslie (ed.). Dictionary of National Biography. Vol. 14. London: Smith, Elder & Co. p. 233.
- Bullen, A. H. & Steggle, Matthew (2004). "Day, James (fl. 1637), poet". Oxford Dictionary of National Biography. Oxford University Press. Accessed 29 June 2022.
- Fairholt, F. W., ed. (1849). Satirical Songs and Poems on Costume: From the 13th to the 19th Century. London: The Percy Society. p. 143.
- "J. M.". (December 1849). "Retrospective Review.—New Spring of Divine Poetrie". The Gentleman's Magazine. Vol. 186. pp. 606–608.
