= Jennifer Margery Day =

Australian volleyball player (born 1984)

Personal information
- Nationality: Australian
- Born: 27 December 1984 (age 41)
- Height: 185 cm (73 in)
- Weight: 68 kg (150 lb)
- Spike: 297 cm (117 in)
- Block: 288 cm (113 in)

Volleyball information
- Number: 8 (national team)

Career
Years	Teams
2014	WA Pearls

National team
2014	Australia

Jennifer Margery Day (born 27 December 1984) is an Australian female volleyball player. She is part of the Australia women's national volleyball team.

She participated in the 2014 FIVB Volleyball World Grand Prix. On club level she played for WA Pearls in 2014.
