= David Talbot Day =

American chemist and geologist

- Born: September 10, 1859; East Rockport, Ohio, US
- Died: April 15, 1925 (aged 65); Washington, D.C., US
- Education: Johns Hopkins University
- Spouse: Elizabeth Eliot Keeler (m. 1886)

David Talbot Day (September 10, 1859 – April 15, 1925) was an American chemist and geologist who analyzed petroleum resources, and particularly the extraction of minerals from oil shale. He established the Mineral Resources Division of the US Geological Survey where he pioneered petrochemical fractionation and analysis using chromatographic techniques.

== Biography ==
Day was born in East Rockport (Lakewood), Ohio where his father Willard Gibson was a minister in the Swedenborgian Church. His mother was Caroline Cathcart. The family moved to Baltimore where Day went to school before joining Johns Hopkins University. He graduated AB in 1881 and took an interest in chemistry, studying under Ira C. Remsen. He received a PhD in 1884 for studies on "Changes Effected by Heat in the Constitution of Ethylene".

He took an interest in minerals and examined them for the US Geological Survey but joined the organization formally only in 1885 when he succeeded Albert Williams, Jr. He was in-charge of the exhibition on petrochemicals at the Chicago World's Fair (1893) and the Paris World Fair (1900). His work on oil shales led to the establishment of the Naval Oil Reserves at Elk Hills in 1912. He worked with Elmer Grant Woodruff on oil shales.

He married Elizabeth Eliot Keeler in 1886 and they had two children.

Day died in Washington, D.C. on April 15, 1925.

== Publications ==
- Chromium (1885)
- Iodine (1885)
- Manganese (1885)
- The Mineral Resources of Hawaii (1898)
- Mineral Resources of the United States, Calendar Year 1888 (1890)
- A Handbook of the Petroleum Industry (1922) Volume 1, Volume 2
