= Albert Day (cricketer) =

English cricketer

Albert George Day (20 September 1865 – 16 October 1908) was an English first-class cricketer, who played six matches for Yorkshire County Cricket Club between 1885 and 1888.

Born in Dewsbury, Yorkshire, England, Day was a right-handed batsman, who scored 78 runs at an average of 7.80, with a best of 25 against Cambridge University, one of three matches he played in against that side. He also appeared against a touring Australian XI. He did not bowl in first-class cricket. He also appeared in two non first-class matches against Scotland in 1888, scoring only 1 and 0. However, he was highly regarded by Dewsbury and Savile Cricket Club with whom he was connected.

Day died in Dewsbury in October 1908.
