= Somerset Archives and Local Studies =

Coordinates: 51.0262°N 3.1369°W

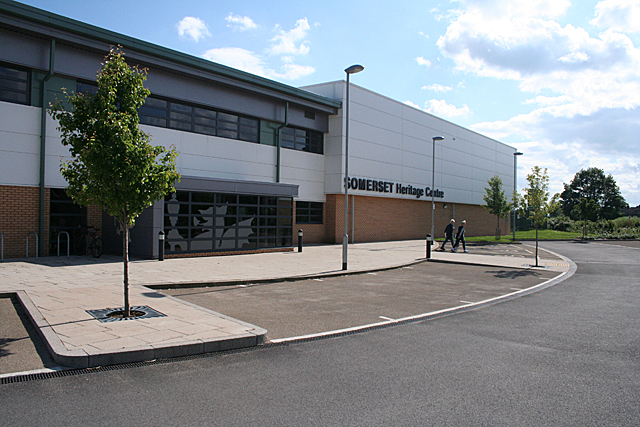
Somerset Heritage Centre

The Somerset Archives and Local Studies holds the archives for the county of Somerset, England. The archives are held at Brunel Way, Langford Mead, Norton Fitzwarren, Taunton, and run by Somerset County Council.

The records held include oral history recordings, estate and manorial records, parish registers and the archives of the Somerset Light Infantry and Avon and Somerset Constabulary.

Management of the archives has been taken over by a charity, the South West Heritage Trust.

== See also ==
- Bath Record Office
