= David V. Day (psychologist) =

American psychologist and academic

- Born: United States

Academic background
- Education: B.A., Psychology; M.A., Industrial-Organizational Psychology; PhD, Industrial-Organizational Psychology
- Alma mater: Baldwin-Wallace College; University of Akron

Academic work
- Institutions: Claremont McKenna College

David V. Day is an American industrial-organizational psychologist, academic, and author. He is a professor of Psychological Science, Steven L. Eggert ’82 P ’15 Professor of Leadership, George R. Roberts Research Fellow, and Academic Director of the Kravis Leadership Institute at Claremont McKenna College.

He is a fellow American Psychological Association, Association for Psychological Science and International Association of Applied Psychology. and Society for Industrial and Organizational Psychology.

== Education ==
Day completed his Bachelor of Arts in 1983 from Baldwin-Wallace College in Psychology part-time while working as an unskilled hourly worker at Ford Motor Company. In 1987, he obtained a Master of Arts in Industrial-Organizational Psychology followed by a PhD in Industrial-Organizational Psychology from the University of Akron in 1989.

== Career ==
Day began his academic career in 1988 as an Assistant Professor of Psychology at Louisiana State University, where he remained until 1991. He then joined the psychology department at Pennsylvania State University, first as an Assistant Professor from 1991 to 1996, then as an Associate Professor from 1996 to 2002, and finally as a Professor until 2006. During his time at Penn State, he also held a concurrent role as Director of Graduate Training in the Department of Psychology. From 2006 to 2008, he was a Professor of Organizational Behaviour at the Lee Kong Chian School of Business, Singapore Management University. Between 2008 and 2016, he held the Winthrop Professorship and the inaugural Woodside Chair in Leadership and Management at the University of Western Australia Business School. Since 2017, he has been Professor of Psychological Science, Academic Director of the Kravis Leadership Institute, and Steven L. Eggert ’82 P’15 Professor of Leadership at Claremont McKenna College.

== Research ==
Day's research focuses on leadership and leadership development. In “Leadership Development: A Review in Context” (2000), published in The Leadership Quarterly, he distinguished leader development, which builds the knowledge and skills of individuals (human capital), from leadership development, which builds relationships and shared capacity to lead within groups and organizations (social capital). Writing in the journal Leadership in 2023, Parisa Gilani, Richard Bolden and Annie Pye described the paper as highly influential and noted that much later research on leadership development draws on this distinction.

In “Leadership Capacity in Teams” (2004), written with Peter Gronn and Eduardo Salas, Day described leadership in teams as an outcome of teamwork and team learning, not only as an input to it. With Hock-Peng Sin, he used longitudinal data to track how individuals develop as leaders over time. In 2014, with John W. Fleenor, Leanne E. Atwater, Rachel E. Sturm and Rob A. McKee, he reviewed 25 years of research and theory on leader and leadership development. Earlier, with Charlotte R. Gerstner, he published a meta-analysis of leader–member exchange theory in the Journal of Applied Psychology.

In 2024, Day published Developing Leaders and Leadership: Principles, Practices, and Processes, which sets out an evidence-based account of how individuals develop as leaders and how groups build a shared capacity for leadership. A review in the European Journal of Training and Development described it as a valuable, evidence-based resource for scholars and practitioners.

As of November 2026, Day's work had been cited more than 45,000 times according to Google Scholar. The 1997 meta-analysis had been cited more than 6,000 times, “Leadership Development: A Review in Context” more than 5,000 times, the 2014 review more than 3,000 times, and “Leadership Capacity in Teams” more than 1,700 times.

In 2019, Rice University's Doerr Institute for New Leaders named Day a fellow. Its executive director, Tom Kolditz, described Day's work toward a science of leader development as among the most important theoretical contributions to the practice of developing leaders. Day has argued that many leadership development programs are short, one-off events with little evidence behind them, and that development should instead allow for ongoing practice.

== Editorial work ==
Day was an Associate Editor of the Journal of Applied Psychology from 2008 to 2014. From 2017 to 2021, he was Editor of The Leadership Quarterly Yearly Review. He was also a member of the inaugural editorial committee of the Annual Review of Organizational Psychology and Organizational Behavior.

== Awards and honors ==
- 2010 – Walter F. Ulmer Jr., Applied Research Award, Center for Creative Leadership
- 2010 – Decennial Influential Article Award, The Leadership Quarterly, for “Leadership Development: A Review in Context”
- 2011 – Best Paper Award, The Leadership Quarterly, for “Longitudinal Tests of an Integrative Model of Leader Development” (with Hock-Peng Sin)
- 2024 – Eminent Scholar Award, Academy of Management Network of Leadership Scholars
- 2024 – Lifetime Achievement Award, International Leadership Association

== Books ==
- An Integrative Approach to Leader Development (2008), with Michelle M. Harrison and Stanley M. Halpin, ISBN 9780415964630
- The Oxford Handbook of Leadership and Organizations (2014), editor, ISBN 9780199755615
- The Nature of Leadership (2017), edited with John Antonakis, ISBN 9781483359274
- Developing Leaders and Leadership: Principles, Practices, and Processes (2024), ISBN 9783031590672
