= A. N. Day =

Australian public servant (1868–1939)

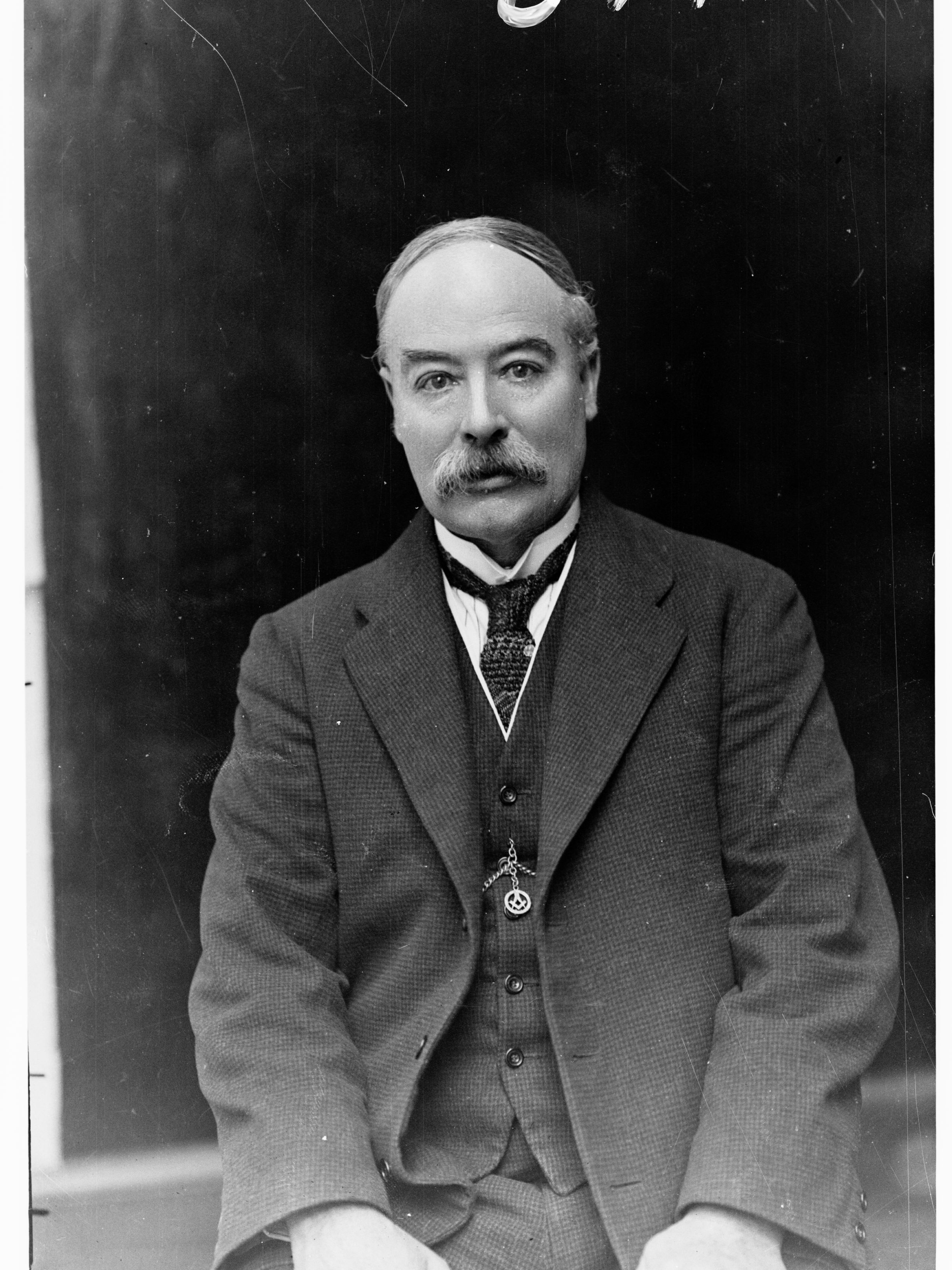
Image of Alfred Norwood Day

Alfred Norwood Day (17 January 1868 – 27 January 1939), invariably referred to as A. N. Day, was a South Australian public servant and senior railways official who was dismissed on the eve of his retirement.

== History ==
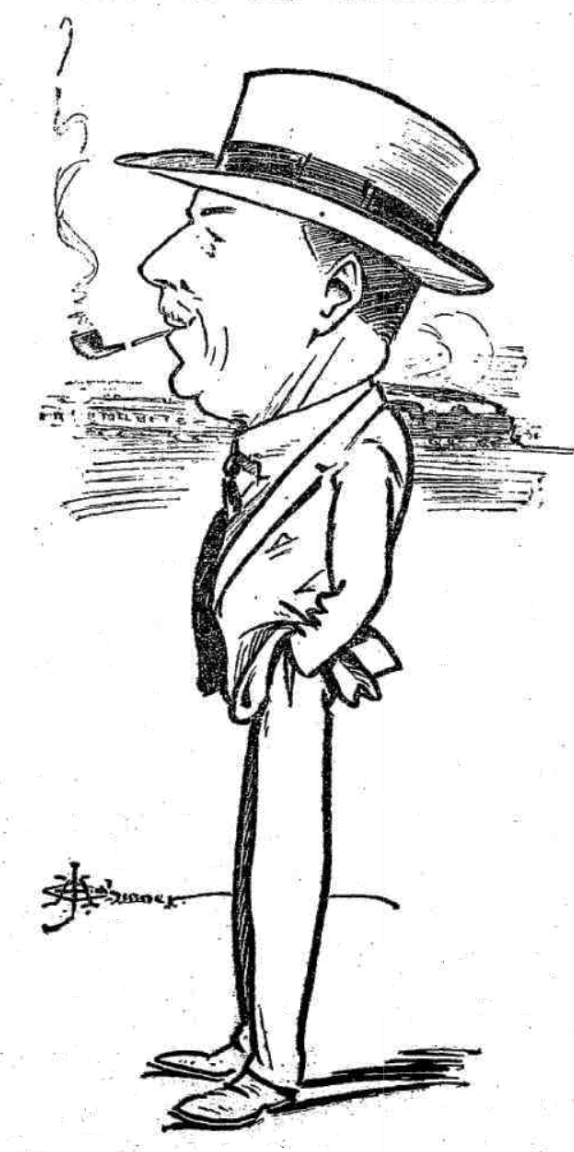
caricature by J. H. Chinner

Day was born the seventh son of George Fowler Day (1821–1901) and Eliza Day née Way (1830–1919), of Sydenham Villa, Norwood, South Australia. He was educated at Prince Alfred College and went to work in 1884 as a cadet in the office of the Hydraulic Engineer's Department. He transferred to the railways division of the Engineer-in-Chief's Department in 1891 as correspondence clerk to the Railways Commissioner. Three years later he became chief clerk, and in 1896 he was appointed secretary to the Railways Commissioner. He was made a JP in 1905, additionally Director of the Tourist Bureau 1908. A Public Service Commission found he was doing work beyond his pay scale and ordered an immediate increase from £80 to £100 and felt that was still inadequate.

He succeeded James McGuire as General Traffic Manager in 1916. He was chairman of the Railways Supply and Tender Board from its inception and was chairman of the State Supply and Tender Board 1915–1929.

== Dismissal ==
Day expected to retire at age 65 on 17 January 1933. He cleared his desk on 7 January and took some leave that was owed to him. On 11 January, it was announced by Bill Denny, Minister for Railways, that Day had been sacked. A special audit had found irregularities in the books of the Refreshment Room for which Day was clearly implicated, but no, Day was not going to be charged with any offence. The amount had been small and had been repaid. The Railways Claims Agent, G. T. Powlesland (1882–1946) (Note: Powlesland was a noted autograph collector) was also dismissed. Both lost their rights to superannuation.

B. H. Gillman (1879–1945) was announced as his successor.

His fully clothed body was found floating in the sea at Taperoo, South Australia on the morning of 27 January 1939, six years later. An inquest was not considered necessary.

== Family ==
Day married May Elizabeth Spiller (c. 1871 – 23 November 1897) on 20 October 1896. He married again, to Constance Isabel Sandoz (died 1955) in 1909. They had one son and one daughter:

- Alfred John Ashton "John" Day (12 August 1910 – 18 September 1984) served in WWII as navigator in RAF No. 57 Lancaster squadron. He was awarded a DFC for his part in the "Dambusters" raid on the Moehne and Eder dams.
- Margaret Isabel Day (9 June 1913 – 4 October 1987)
