= Day-Lewis =

Day-Lewis is a surname, and may refer to:

- Cecil Day-Lewis (1904–1972), English poet
- Daniel Day-Lewis (born 1957), English film actor; son of Cecil Day-Lewis
- Frank Day-Lewis (1872–1938), Church of Ireland priest; father of Cecil Day-Lewis
- Tamasin Day-Lewis (born 1954), English television chef; daughter of Cecil Day-Lewis
