= James L. Day =

United States Marine Corps general

James Lewis Day
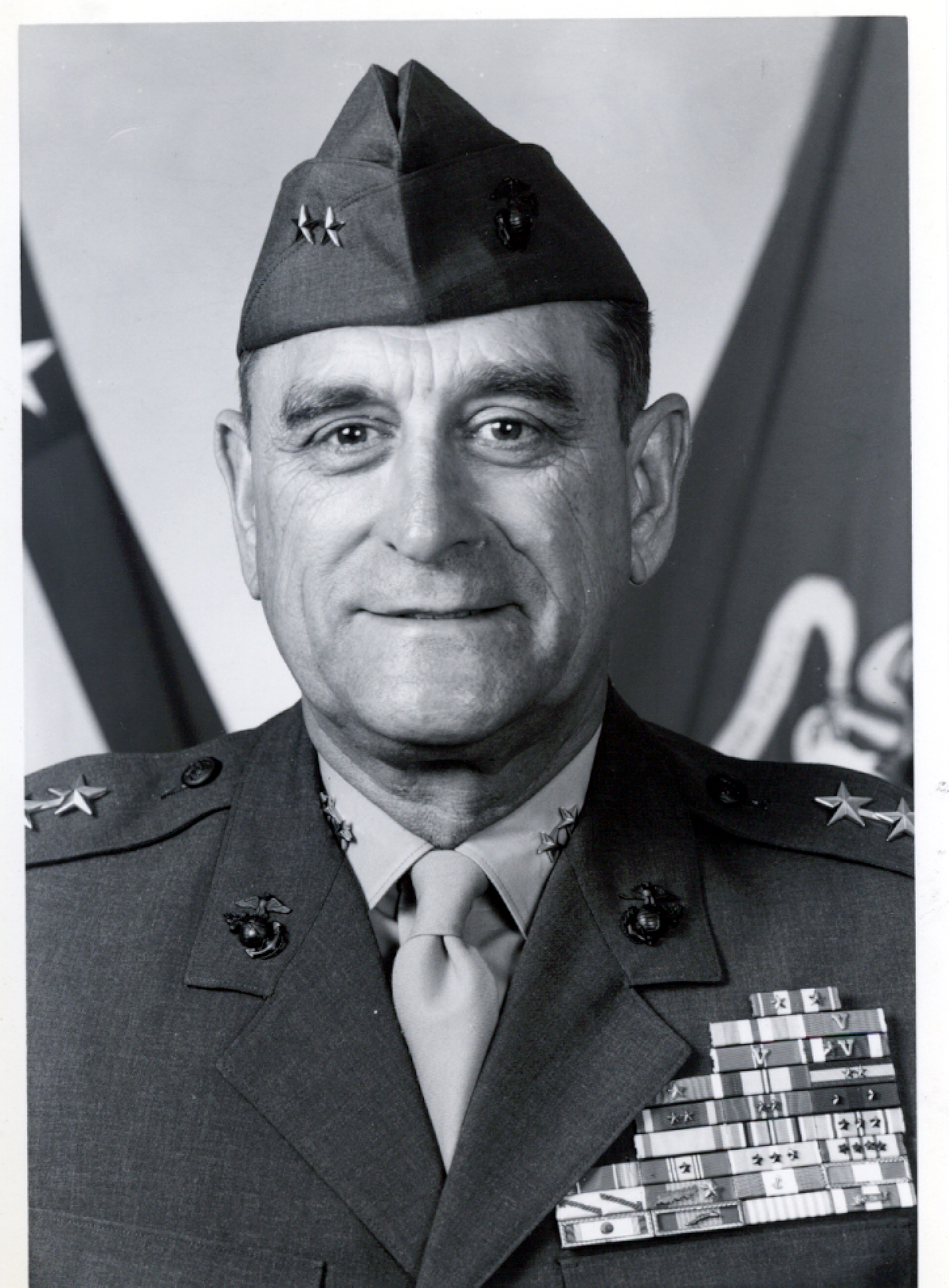
- MajGen James L. Day, Medal of Honor recipient
- Born: October 5, 1925; East St. Louis, Illinois, U.S.
- Died: October 28, 1998 (aged 73); Cathedral City, California, U.S.
- Burial place: Fort Rosecrans National Cemetery, San Diego, California
- Military career
- Allegiance: United States of America
- Branch: United States Marine Corps
- Service years: 1943–1986
- Rank: Major general
- Unit: 2nd Battalion 22nd Marines
- Commands: 1st Battalion, 9th Marines; 2nd Infantry Training Regiment; Camp Fuji; 4th Marine Corps District; MCRD San Diego; 7th Marine Amphibious Brigade; 1st Marine Division; I MAF; Camp Smedley Butler
- Conflicts: World War II; Pacific War; Gilbert and Marshall Islands campaign; Mariana and Palau Islands campaign; Battle of Guam; Volcano and Ryukyu Islands campaign; Battle of Okinawa; Korean War Vietnam War
- Awards: Medal of Honor; Navy Distinguished Service Medal; Silver Star Medal with two gold stars Defense Superior Service Medal; Legion of Merit with combat "V"; Bronze Star Medal with Combat "V"; Purple Heart Medal (6); The Navy Commendation Medal with Combat "V" and gold star Combat Action Ribbon

Major General James Lewis Day (October 5, 1925 – October 28, 1998) was a United States Marine Corps major general who served in World War II, in the Korean War, and in the Vietnam War. He was awarded the Medal of Honor for his heroic actions as a corporal on May 14 to 17, 1945 during the Battle of Okinawa in World War II.

Upon awarding him the Medal of Honor, President Clinton said:

During a career that spanned more than four decades, he rose from enlisted man through the ranks to major general, becoming one of the greatest mustangs the Marine Corps ever produced. In Korea, his valor in combat was recognized with two Silver Stars. In Vietnam, his leadership and bravery under fire earned him a third Silver Star. Just as astonishing, for his service in three wars, Jim Day received six Purple Hearts.

== Biography ==
James Day was born October 5, 1925, in East St. Louis, Illinois. Day held a Bachelor of Science degree in political science and a Master of Business Administration degree.

World War II

He enlisted in the United States Marine Corps in 1943.

Day participated in combat action during World War II in the Marshall Islands, on Guam and on Okinawa, where for his heroic actions during the fight for Sugar Loaf Hill he was later awarded the Medal of Honor.

Korean War

In September 1952, he completed The Basic School at Quantico, Virginia, and was transferred to Korea where he served with Company C, 1st Battalion, 7th Marines and the 1st Reconnaissance Company. He saw combat and was awarded two Silver Stars.

Post Korea

First Lieutenant Day served as the S-3 officer, Marine Corps Supply Center, Barstow, California, until July 1954, when he was transferred to Camp Pendleton, California, for duty as commanding officer, Company C, Marine Corps Test Unit One. He was promoted to captain in December 1954. Day remained at Camp Pendleton until May 1956, and was then assigned as operations officer of the Recruit Training Command, Marine Corps Recruit Depot San Diego.

In September 1957, he was transferred to Okinawa and served as commanding officer, 4.2 Mortar Company, and later served as a battalion operations officer with the 9th Marines, 3rd Marine Division. Returning stateside in December 1958, he was assigned as instructor, Tactics Group, The Basic School, Quantico. He was promoted to major in August 1962 and attended the Amphibious Warfare School, also at Quantico. Day was transferred to the 4th Marine Corps District in July 1963 and served as inspector-instructor, 43rd Rifle Company, Cumberland, Maryland.

Vietnam War

In April 1966, Day served his first tour in Vietnam as commanding officer, 1st Battalion, 9th Marines, 3rd Marine Division. Returning to Camp Pendleton in June 1967, he was assigned as the commanding officer, 1st Battalion 28th Marines, 5th Marine Division. He was promoted to lieutenant colonel in July 1967 and in January 1968, he was reassigned as battalion commander, 2nd Infantry Training Regiment, Camp Pendleton.

Day served at Pearl Harbor, Hawaii, from July 1969 to June 1971 and attended the Army War College, Carlisle Barracks, Pennsylvania, from July 1971 to June 1972. After graduation, he served his second tour in Vietnam as operations officer, 9th Marine Amphibious Brigade, III Marine Amphibious Force.

He saw combat in Vietnam and was awarded a third Silver Star.

According to the 6th Marine Division's official website, Day "is believed to be the only Marine infantryman to have been wounded and decorated for valor in all three wars [that is, World War II, Korea and Vietnam]."

Post Vietnam

He was reassigned as commanding officer, Camp Fuji, Japan, in March 1973. He was promoted to colonel in November 1973 and was transferred to Philadelphia for duty as deputy director, and later, director, 4th Marine Corps District. He remained in that billet until April 1, 1976, when he was advanced to brigadier general. He assumed duties as assistant depot commander, Marine Corps Recruit Depot San Diego, in May 1976, and on November 1, 1977, he became commanding general of the depot, serving in that capacity until March 11, 1978.

On April 29, 1978, he was assigned duty as deputy director for operations, J-3, NMCC, Joint Chiefs of Staff, Washington, D.C. During July 1979, Day was assigned duty as the assistant division commander, 1st Marine Division/Commanding General, 7th Marine Amphibious Brigade, Fleet Marine Force, Pacific, Camp Pendleton. He was promoted to major general on August 1, 1980, and assumed duty as the commanding general, 1st Marine Division, and was ultimately assigned the additional duty as commanding general, I Marine Amphibious Force, on July 1, 1981. He served in that capacity until August 1982, when he was assigned duty as the deputy chief of staff for training, Headquarters, U.S. Marine Corps, Washington, D.C. In July 1984, he was assigned duty as the commanding general, Marine Corps Base Camp Smedley D. Butler/Deputy Commander, Marine Corps Bases, Pacific (Forward)/Okinawa Area Coordinator, Okinawa, Japan. He served in this capacity until his retirement on December 1, 1986. Upon his retirement, he was presented the Navy Distinguished Service Medal for exceptionally meritorious service to the Government of the United States for duties while serving in his final duty station.

Medal of Honor

Major General Day was presented the Medal of Honor by President Clinton in the White House on January 20, 1998, over a half a century after the World War II battle on Okinawa, the fight for Sugar Loaf Hill, in which he distinguished himself as a Corporal.

Upon presenting Major General Day with the Medal of Honor, President Clinton explained why there had been such a long delay in awarding him the Medal of Honor:

Let me tell you the story of how we happen to be here today, over 50 years later. Although the battle for Okinawa was still raging when his battlefield commanders nominated young Corporal Day for this decoration, so many died in the fighting and so many reports were lost in the battle, the paperwork simply never went forward in 1945. General Day later said that awards weren't on their minds in those days. As he put it, "We just had a job to do, and we wanted to get the job done." Years later, when veterans of Sugar Loaf wanted to restart the process, Jim Day forbade them from doing so. Then a general, he felt that seeking such an honor would set a bad example for those he commanded.

The AP's obituary of Major General Day briefly explains there was such a long delay in awarding him the Medal of Honor:

The paperwork for his medal was lost in the chaos of the battlefield but resurfaced in 1980 when a retired Marine found faded carbon copies of the recommendation among his World War II memorabilia. It took an additional 18 years for the paperwork to reach the appropriate officials.

The 6th Marine Division's official website provides some further details of the reason for the long delay in awarding him the Medal of Honor:

Many of the men who witnessed his bravery were killed. But there were enough witnesses that he was recommended for the Medal of Honor. Statements were taken, but they were misplaced or lost after Cpl Day's battalion commander was killed. In addition, his company commander was wounded and evacuated. Cpl Day's Medal of Honor fell through the cracks. Decades later some of the documents resurfaced. It took many more years for the necessary paperwork to be gathered and submitted.

Death

He died of a heart attack later that year on October 28, 1998, in Cathedral City, California. He was laid to rest in Fort Rosecrans National Cemetery, San Diego, California.

== Military decorations & awards ==
Major General Day's service ribbons include:

1st Row	Medal of Honor			
2nd Row	Navy Distinguished Service Medal	Silver Star w/ 2 gold 5/16 inch star	Defense Superior Service Medal	Legion of Merit w/ Combat "V"
3rd Row	Bronze Star Medal w/ Combat "V"	Purple Heart Medal w/ bronze 5/16 inch star	Navy and Marine Corps Commendation Medal w/ gold 5/16 inch star & Combat "V"	Combat Action Ribbon w/2 gold 5/16 inch stars
3rd Row	Navy Presidential Unit Citation w/ 2 service stars	Navy Unit Commendation w/ 2 service stars	Navy Meritorious Unit Commendation w/ 2 service stars	Marine Corps Good Conduct Medal w/ 2 service stars
4th Row	China Service Medal	American Campaign Medal	Asiatic-Pacific Campaign Medal w/ 3 service stars	World War II Victory Medal
5th Row	National Defense Service Medal w/ service star	Korean Service Medal w/ 3 service stars	Vietnam Service Medal w/ 4 service stars	Vietnam Navy Distinguished Service Order, 2nd Class
6th Row	Vietnam Gallantry Cross w/ palm & gold star	Vietnam Navy Gallantry Cross w/ silver anchor	Philippine Presidential Unit Citation	Korean Presidential Unit Citation
7th Row	Vietnam Gallantry Cross Unit Citation	United Nations Korea Medal	Vietnam Campaign Medal	Korean War Service Medal

=== Medal of Honor citation ===
Major General James L. Day was awarded the Medal of Honor, the nation's highest military award for valor, for heroism on Okinawa as a corporal while serving as a squad leader of Weapons Company, 2nd Battalion, 22nd Marines, 6th Marine Division.

Citation

The President of the United States in the name of the Congress takes pleasure in presenting the MEDAL OF HONOR to
CORPORAL JAMES L. DAY
UNITED STATES MARINE CORPS RESERVE
for service as set forth in the following CITATION:

For conspicuous gallantry and intrepidity at the risk of his life above and beyond the call of duty as a squad leader serving with the Second Battalion, Twenty-Second Marines, Sixth Marine Division, in sustained combat operations against Japanese forces on Okinawa, Ryukyu Islands from 14 to 17 May 1945. On the first day, Corporal Day rallied his squad and the remnants of another unit and led them to a critical position forward of the front lines of Sugar Loaf Hill. Soon thereafter, they came under an intense mortar and artillery barrage that was quickly followed by a fanatical ground attack of about forty Japanese soldiers. Despite the loss of one-half of his men, Corporal Day remained at the forefront, shouting encouragement, hurling hand grenades, and directing deadly fire thereby repelling the determined enemy. Reinforced by six men, he led his squad in repelling three fierce night attacks but suffered five additional Marines killed and one wounded whom he assisted to safety. Upon hearing nearby calls for corpsman assistance, Corporal Day braved heavy enemy fire to escort four seriously wounded Marines, one at a time, to safety. Corporal Day then manned a light machine gun assisted by a wounded Marine, and halted another frenzied night attack. In this ferocious action, his machine gun was destroyed, and he suffered multiple white phosphorus and fragmentation wounds. Assisted by only one partially effective man, he reorganized his defensive position in time to halt a fifth enemy attack with devastating small arms fire. On three separate occasions, Japanese soldiers closed to within a few feet of his foxhole, but were killed by Corporal Day. During the second day, the enemy conducted numerous unsuccessful swarming attacks against his exposed position. When the attacks momentarily subsided, over 70 enemy dead were counted around his position. On the third day, a wounded and exhausted Corporal Day repulsed the enemy's final attack and dispatched around 12 of the enemy at close range. Having yielded no ground and with more than 100 enemy dead around his position, Corporal Day preserved the lives of his fellow Marines and made a primal contribution to the success of the Okinawa campaign. By his extraordinary heroism, repeated acts of valor, and quintessential battlefield leadership, Corporal Day inspired the efforts of his outnumbered Marines to defeat a much larger enemy force, reflecting great credit upon himself and upholding the highest traditions of the Marine Corps and the United States Naval Service.

=== First Silver Star citation ===
Citation:

The President of the United States of America takes pleasure in presenting the Silver Star to Second Lieutenant James Lewis Day (MCSN: 0-56003), United States Marine Corps, for conspicuous gallantry and intrepidity as a Platoon Commander of the First Reconnaissance Company, Headquarters Battalion, FIRST Marine Division (Reinforced), in action against enemy aggressor forces in Korea on 23 January 1953. Skillfully leading his patrol deep into hostile territory to attack an enemy-held position from the rear, Second Lieutenant Day immediately proceeded to the head of the unit after contact was established, to control the action more effectively. After killing one hostile soldier and capturing another, he ordered his men to hold their fire until the enemy force had approached to within twenty yards of the patrol's position. Although painfully wounded during the ensuing firefight, he bravely directed the efforts of his men until the hostile force had been eliminated and steadfastly refused medical treatment until his patrol and the prisoner had withdrawn from the area. Throughout the disengagement, he remained with the rear guard to ensure the unit's safe return to the main line of resistance. By his courageous leadership, resolute determination and gallant devotion to duty, Second Lieutenant Day contributed immeasurably to the success of the mission and served to inspire all who observed him, thereby upholding the highest traditions of the United States Naval Service.

=== Second Silver Star citation ===
Citation:

The President of the United States of America takes pleasure in presenting a Gold Star in lieu of a Second Award of the Silver Star to Lieutenant Colonel [then Second Lieutenant] James Lewis Day (MCSN: 0-56003), United States Marine Corps, for conspicuous gallantry and intrepidity in action against the enemy while serving with a Marine reconnaissance company in Korea on 26 October 1952. Leading a patrol of four men in front of the main line of resistance, Colonel (then Second Lieutenant) Day displayed outstanding courage, initiative and devotion to duty. When contact was established with the advance element of a major enemy force his patrol killed ten of the enemy and captured two. Breaking off contact he returned to friendly lines with the two prisoners and continued to fight the enemy force beside the Marines on the front lines. He personally killed two of the enemy with his trench knife and directed the defense of the position after the platoon leader was killed. He continued his heroic defense action until relieved by friendly forces. Colonel Day's gallant and courageous actions served as an inspiration to all who observed him and were in keeping with the highest traditions of the Marine Corps and the United States Naval Service.

=== Third Silver Star citation ===
Citation:

The President of the United States of America takes pleasure in presenting a Second Gold Star in lieu of a Third Award of the Silver Star to Major James Lewis Day (MCSN: 0-56003), United States Marine Corps, for conspicuous gallantry and intrepidity in action while serving as Commanding Officer of the First Battalion, 9th Marines, THIRD Marine Division, in connection with combat operations against the enemy in the Republic of Vietnam. From 2 to 4 March 1967, during Operation Prairie II, Major Day led his battalion on a search and destroy mission west of Cam Lo near the Demilitarized Zone, and consistently demonstrated exceptional courage, aggressiveness and sound judgment while engaged against well organized and heavily armed North Vietnamese Army forces. Late in the afternoon of 2 March, his battalion was moving from Hill 162 toward a nearby hill mass known as the "Three Sisters," when the Marines suddenly came under intense mortar, rocket and automatic weapons fire from an estimated force of two reinforced companies, entrenched in fortified positions. Major Day immediately moved forward to assess the situation and quickly maneuvered two companies into the assault. During the next four hours, in which the enemy was repulsed and overrun in a series of savage actions, Major Day continuously exposed himself to withering enemy fire as he moved from one position to another directing and encouraging the lead companies in their many engagements against a ferocious and determined enemy. Despite numerous casualties and the fact that darkness was approaching, Major Day continued to maneuver his battalion forward in pursuit of the remnants of the enemy force. This action resulted in over 180 enemy killed, eighteen prisoners captured and nearly 200 weapons seized. Realizing that the enemy would attempt to withdraw from the area during the night and escape to the north, Major Day directed his unit into a blocking position, channelizing the enemy's withdrawal into a prearranged killing zone. Subsequent Marine air strikes and artillery fire accounted for an additional forty-four enemy killed. On the morning of 3 March, he received intelligence information that two large enemy forces, estimated at 500 men, were maneuvering northeast to attack an adjacent Marine battalion. Quickly evaluating the situation, Major Day deployed two companies to intercept the enemy forces. His skillful employment of supporting arms and air strikes disorganized the hostile force, enabling the Marines to achieve tactical surprise. During the ensuing fire fight which lasted for almost two hours, his unit killed or captured nearly 100 enemy while sustaining only minor Marine casualties. On 4 March, as the battalion continued its search and destroy mission, it came under an intense 82-mm. mortar attack. One round exploded near Major Day and knocked him into a bomb crater, seriously injuring his back. With complete disregard for his painful injury, he courageously continued to lead his battalion aggressively throughout the day, effectively utilizing supporting arms and ground forces to inflict heavy casualties on the enemy. Only after his battalion was consolidated into night defensive positions, re-supply was accomplished and casualties were evacuated, did he permit himself to be evacuated. By his dynamic leadership, exemplary initiative and selfless devotion to duty, Major Day inspired all who served with him and upheld the highest traditions of the Marine Corps and of the United States Naval Service.

== Other honors ==
A Golden Palm Star on the Palm Springs Walk of Stars was dedicated to Day for Veterans Day in 1999, recognizing him as one of five Medal of Honor recipients from the Southern California desert area. James L. Day Middle School in Temecula, California, is named after him.

== See also ==
- List of Medal of Honor recipients
- List of Medal of Honor recipients for World War II
