= List of museums in County Durham =

This list of museums in County Durham, England, contains museums which are defined for this context as institutions (including nonprofit organizations, government entities, and private businesses) that collect and care for objects of cultural, artistic, scientific, or historical interest and make their collections or related exhibits available for public viewing. Also included are non-profit art galleries and university art galleries. Museums that exist only in cyberspace (i.e., virtual museums) are not included.

| Name | Image | Town/City | Type | Summary |
|---|---|---|---|---|
| Ankers House Museum | | Chester-le-Street | Religious | Located at St Mary and St Cuthbert Church, medieval room used by anchorites |
| Auckland Castle | | Bishop Auckland | Historic house | Home of the Bishop of Durham for over 800 years |
| Beamish Museum | | Beamish | Open air | Focus is 1825 and 1913 life in urbanized North East England, includes trains, agriculture, industry exhibits |
| Bishop Auckland Town Hall | | Bishop Auckland | Art | Former town hall, houses Bishop Auckland's main public library, a theatre, an art gallery, tourist information centre and a café-bar |
| Bowes Museum | | Barnard Castle | Art | Includes fine art, decorative art, ceramics, textiles, tapestries, clocks and costumes |
| DLI Museum | | Durham | Military | History of the Durham Light Infantry, located in same building as the Durham Art Gallery |
| Durham Art Gallery | | Durham | Art | modern and contemporary art, located in same building as the DLI Museum |
| Durham Castle | | Durham | Historic house | Norman castle, part of University College, Durham, open for guided tours |
| Durham Cathedral | | Durham | Religious | Includes tower, monk's dormitory, shrine of Saint Cuthbert of Lindisfarne, exhibits on the cathedral's construction and history |
| Durham Mining Museum | | Spennymoor | Mining | mining in the Northern part of England |
| Durham Museum and Heritage Centre | | Durham | Local | Local history |
| Hartlepool Art Gallery | | Hartlepool | Art | Operated by the Hartlepool Borough Council, exhibits of crafts, contemporary and fine art, and photography |
| Hartlepool's Maritime Experience | | Hartlepool | Maritime | Recreation of an 18th-century seaport in the time of Lord Nelson, Napoleon and the Battle of Trafalgar |
| Heugh Battery Museum | | Hartlepool | Military | Restored 19th century coastal defense battery and exhibits about local coastal artillery forces |
| HMS Trincomalee | | Hartlepool | Maritime | Early 19th century Royal Navy Leda class frigate museum ship |
| Hopetown Carriage Works | | Durham | Railway | |
| Hopetown Darlington | | Darlington | Railway | Heritage railroad and museum |
| Killhope | | Killhope | Mining | Former 19th century lead mine, minerals, life of the miner and family |
| Museum of Archaeology | | Durham | Archaeology | Also known as Old Fulling Mill Museum of Archaeology, part of the University of Durham, artifacts from prehistoric, Ancient Greece, Roman and medieval periods |
| Museum of Hartlepool | | Hartlepool | Local | Local history, maritime heritage, PS Wingfield Castle museum ship |
| National Railway Museum Shildon | | Shildon | Railway | Branch of the National Railway Museum, includes over 70 railway heritage vehicles |
| Oriental Museum | | Durham | Ethnographic | Part of the University of Durham, includes Chinese, Egyptian, Korean, Japanese and other far east and Asian artifacts |
| Palace Green Library | | Durham | Library | Part of the Durham University Library, exhibits from the University's collections in art, history, culture, literature, |
| Preston Park Museum & Grounds | | Preston-on-Tees | Local | Includes a recreated period street of the 1890s, period rooms, an armoury and a toy collection |
| Raby Castle | | Staindrop | Historic house | Medieval castle with 18th & 19th century decorations, deer park, gardens |
| Rokeby Park | | Greta Bridge | Historic house | Palladian-style country house |
| Spennymoor Town Hall Art Gallery | | Spennymoor | Art | Municipal art gallery |
| Tanfield Railway | | Tanfield | Railway | Heritage railroad and shed with locomotives and equipment |
| Weardale Museum | | Ireshopeburn | Local | Local history, mining, geology, John Wesley and Methodist memorabilia, farming, railway |

== Defunct museums ==
- Durham Miners Heritage Centre
- Vintage Vehicles Shildon, closed in 2012

== Bibliography ==
- Visit Britain: Museums and Galleries in County Durham
- This is Durham

== See also ==
- Visitor attractions in County Durham
