= Designation Scheme =

System for recognising library and museum collections in England

The Designation Scheme is an English system that awards "Designated status" to museum, library and archive collections of national and international importance. The Scheme is administered by Arts Council England (ACE). As of 2023, 163 collections are officially designated. National museums are not eligible for Designated status.

The Scheme was first launched in 1997 under the auspices of what eventually became the Museums, Libraries and Archives Council (MLA) and originally covered only museum collections. Harewood House became the first stately home to be awarded Designated status in 1998. The scheme was expanded to cover libraries and archives in 2005. Responsibility was transferred to the Arts Council in October 2011 following the closure of the MLA.

== Designated collections ==
List of designated collections as of February 2026.

Holding Organisation	Collection Name	Arts Council England (ACE) Area	Year Granted
Ashmolean Museum (Gardens, Libraries and Museums (GLAM) - University of Oxford), Oxford	Ashmolean Museum Collections	South East	1997
The Barber Institute of Fine Arts (University of Birmingham), Birmingham	The Barber Institute of Fine Arts Collection	Midlands	1998
The Baring Archive, City of London	The Baring Archive	London	2009
Bath and North East Somerset Council - Heritage Services, Bath	Bath Fashion Museum Collection	South West	1999
Bath and North East Somerset Council - Heritage Services, Bath	Roman Baths Museum Collection	South West	1999
Bath Record Office, Bath	Bath Record Office Archive Collection	South West	2005
Beamish, the Living Museum of the North, Beamish	Beamish, the Living Museum of the North Collection	North	1997
Birmingham Libraries, Birmingham	Photography Collection Held by Birmingham Libraries	Midlands	2005
Birmingham Libraries, Birmingham	Archive Held by Birmingham Libraries	Midlands	2005
Birmingham Libraries, Birmingham	Early and Fine Printing Held by Birmingham Libraries	Midlands	2005
Birmingham Libraries, Birmingham	Literature Collections Held by Birmingham Libraries	Midlands	2005
Birmingham Libraries, Birmingham	Music Collections Held by Birmingham Libraries	Midlands	2005
Birmingham Libraries, Birmingham	The Birmingham Collection	Midlands	2005
Birmingham Museums Trust, Birmingham	Fine & Decorative Arts Collections Held by Birmingham Museums Trust	Midlands	1997
Birmingham Museums Trust, Birmingham	Science Collections Held by Birmingham Museums Trust	Midlands	1997
Birmingham Museums Trust, Birmingham	Birmingham History and Numismatics Collections Held by Birmingham Museums Trust	Midlands	1998
Birmingham Museums Trust, Birmingham	The Pinto Collection Held by Birmingham Museums Trust	Midlands	1998
Black Country Living Museum, Dudley	Black Country Living Museum Collections	Midlands	2012
Bodleian Libraries (Gardens, Libraries and Museums (GLAM) - University of Oxford), Oxford	Special Collections at the Bodleian Library	South East	2006
The Bowes Museum, Durham	The Bowes Museum Collection, Barnard Castle	North	1997
Bradford Industrial Museum (Bradford Museums and Galleries), Bradford	Worsted Collection	North	2009
Bristol City Museums, Bristol	Bristol City Museums Collection of Applied Art	South West	1998
Bristol City Museums, Bristol	Bristol City Museums Far East Collection	South West	1998
Bristol City Museums, Bristol	Bristol City Museums Geology Collection	South West	1998
Bristol City Museums, Bristol	City of Bristol Collections	South West	1998
Bristol City Record Office and Bristol Central Library's Local Studies Service, Bristol	The Archive, History and Literacy Collection Relating to the History and Development of the City of Bristol	South West	2005
British Motor Museum, Gaydon	British Motor Museum Collection	Midlands	2014
Britten-Pears Foundation, Aldeburgh	The Britten-Pears Library	South East	2005
BT Archives, London	BT Archives	London	2012
Cambridge University Herbarium, Cambridge	Cambridge University Herbarium	South East	2022
Cambridge University Library, Cambridge	Special Collections at Cambridge University Library	South East	2019
Canal Museum, Stoke Bruerne	The Collections at Canal Museum Stoke Bruerne	Midlands	1999
Chesterholm Museum (Vindolanda), Bardon Mill	The Vindolanda Trust Collection	North	2016
Chetham's Library, Manchester	Chetham's Library Collection	North	2011
Churchill College, University of Cambridge, Cambridge	Churchill Archives Centre	South East	2005
City of London Corporation, City of London	History of London Collection	London	2005
Colchester and Ipswich Museums, Colchester	Colechester Castle Museum's Archaeology Collection	South East	1998
Compton Verney, Compton Verney	Archaic Chinese Bronzes	Midlands	2008
Co-operative Archive Trust, Manchester	Co-operative Archive Trust Collections	North	2007
Cornwall Record Office, Redruth	Archives Relating to Cornwall's Hard-Rock Mining Industry	South West	2005
Courtauld Institute of Art, City of Westminster	The Courtauld Collection	London	1997
Culture Coventry, Coventry	Coventry Transport Museum Collection	Midlands	1998
Derby Museums, Derby	Joseph Wright of Derby Collection	Midlands	2011
Dulwich Picture Gallery, London	Dulwich Picture Gallery Collection	London	1997
Durham University Library, Durham	The Bishop Cosin's Library	North	2005
Durham University Library, Durham	The Sudan Archive	North	2005
Durham University Oriental Museum, Durham	Chinese Collections	North	2008
Durham University Oriental Museum, Durham	Ancient Egyptian Collections	North	2008
English Folk Dance and Song Society, London	Vaughan Williams Memorial Library	London	2011
Hampshire Record Office, Winchester	The Records Held by the Hampshire Record Office	South East	2006
Harewood House Trust, Harewood, Leeds	Harewood House Trust Collection	North	1998
Historic Royal Palaces, London	Hampton Court Palace	London	2009
Horniman Museum and Gardens, London	Ethnographic Collections at the Horniman Museum	London	1997
Institution of Civil Engineers, City of Westminster	Library, Archive and Works of Art	London	2009
Institution of Engineering and Technology, City of Westminster	Collections of the Institute of Electrical Engineers, that is the Rare Books, the Archives and the Library	London	2006
Ipswich Museum, Ipswich Borough Council, Ipswich	Post-Cretaceous Geology Collection	South East	2023
Ironbridge Gorge Museum Trust, Coalbrookdale	The Ironbridge Gorge Trust Collections	Midlands	1997
Jewish Museum London, London	Religious Life (Judaica) Collection at the Jewish Museum London	London	1997
John Rylands University Library (University of Manchester), Manchester	Special Collections at John Rylands University Library	North	2005
John Rylands University Library (University of Manchester), Manchester	Manchester Medical Society Library	North	2005
King's College London, City of Westminster	Liddell Hart Military Archives	London	2005
Kingston upon Hull City Museums and Art Galleries, Kingston upon Hull	Hull Museums Collections Relating to the City and Region	North	1999
Lambeth Palace Library, London	The Manuscripts, Archives and Printed Books Collection	London	2005
Lancashire County Museum Service, Preston	Textile Industry Collection	North	1999
Lapworth Museum of Geology (University of Birmingham), Birmingham	Lapworth Museum of Geology Collections	Midlands	2008
Leeds Museums and Galleries, Leeds	Leeds Museums and Galleries Fine and Decorative Arts Collection	North	1997
Leeds Museums and Galleries, Leeds	Leeds Museums and Galleries Natural Sciences Collection	North	1998
Leeds Museums and Galleries, Leeds	Leeds Museums and Galleries Industrial Collections	North	1999
Leeds University Special Collections Centre, Leeds	The English Literature Collection	North	2005
Leeds University Special Collections Centre, Leeds	Gypsy, Traveller and Roma Collections	North	2005
Leeds University Special Collections Centre, Leeds	The Cookery Collection	North	2005
Leeds University Special Collections Centre, Leeds	The Leeds Russian Archive	North	2005
Leeds University Special Collections Centre, Leeds	The Liddle Collection	North	2005
Library and Museum of Freemasonry, Freemasons Hall, London	Library and Museum of Freemasonry Collections	London	2007
Lincolnshire Archives, Lincoln	Lincoln Episcopal Rolls and Registers	Midlands	2005
Linnean Society of London, City of Westminster	Library, Archive and Biological Specimen Collections	London	2014
Liverpool and Merseyside Record Offices Liverpool	Photographic Image Collection	North	2006
London School of Economics and Political Science, London	British Library of Political and Economic Science	London	2005
London School of Economics and Political Science (Applied as London Metropolitan University), London	The Women's Library	London	2006
London Transport Museum, City of Westminster	London Transport Museum Collection	London	1997
Lyme Regis Museum	The Lyme Regis Jurassic Coast Geology Collection	South West	2025
Manchester City Galleries, Manchester	Manchester City Galleries Fine and Decorative Art Collections	North	1997
Manchester City Galleries, Manchester	Manchester City Galleries Costume and Textile Collections	North	1997
Manchester Museum, University of Manchester, Manchester	Manchester Museum Collection	North	1997
Mary Rose Trust, Portsmouth	Mary Rose Museum Collection	South West	1997
Middlesex University, Museum of Design and Domestic Architecture, London	Silver Studio Collection	London	2008
Modern Records Centre, University of Warwick, Coventry	Modern Records Centre Collections	Midlands	2006
Museum of Design in Plastics, Arts University Bournemouth, Bournemouth	Museum of Design in Plastics Collection	South West	2021
Museum of London, City of London	Museum of London Collection	London	1997
Museum of Natural History (Gardens, Libraries and Museums (GLAM) - University of Oxford), Oxford	Museum of Natural History Collections	South East	1997
Museum of the History of Science (Gardens, Libraries & Museums (GLAM) - University of Oxford), Oxford	History of Science Museum Collections	South East	1997
Museums Sheffield, Sheffield	Sheffield Museums Metalwork Collections	North	1999
National Football Museum, Manchester	National Football Museum Collections	North	2013
National Motor Museum, Beaulieu	National Motor Museum Collection	South West	1997
National Tramway Museum, Crich	National Tramway Museum Collection	Midlands	1997
Norfolk Museums Service, Norwich	Norwich Castle Museum Collections	South East	1998
Norfolk Record Office, Norwich	History of Norfolk Archive	South East	2005
Northampton Museum and Art Gallery	Boot and Shoe Collection at Northampton Museum and Art Gallery	Midlands	1998
Nottingham Museums (Heritage), Nottingham	Lace and Lace Machinery Collections	Midlands	2014
People's History Museum, Manchester	People's History Museum Collection	North	1998
Pitt Rivers Museum (Gardens, Libraries & Museums (GLAM) - University of Oxford), Oxford	Pitt Rivers Collection	South East	1997
Royal Academy of Arts, City of Westminster	Royal Academy of Arts Collections, Library and Archives	London	2011
Royal Academy of Music, City of Westminster	Special Collections and Archives of the Royal Academy of Music Library	London	2005
Royal Albert Memorial Museum, Exeter	World Cultures Collections at Royal Albert Memorial Museum	South West	1998
Royal Albert Memorial Museum, Exeter	George Montagu Collection	South West	2019
Royal College of Music, London	Royal College of Music, Museum and Library Collections	London	2020
Royal College of Surgeons of England, London	Hunterian Museum Collection and the Archive and Library Collections	London	2013
Royal Engineers Museum, Gillingham	Royal Engineers Museum	South East	1998
Royal Geographical Society (with Institute of British Geographers), City of Westminster	Geographical Material Held by the Royal Geographical Society with the Institute of British Geographers	London	2005
Royal Horticultural Society, City of Westminster	Lindley Library Collection	London	2011
Royal Institute of British Architects (RIBA), City of Westminster	British Architecture Library	London	2005
Royal Pavilion and Museums Brighton & Hove, Brighton and Hove	Booth Museum Natural History Collection	South East	1997
Royal Pavilion and Museums Brighton & Hove, Brighton and Hove	Decorative Arts Collections Held by Royal Pavilion and Museums Brighton & Hove	South East	1998
Royal Pavilion and Museums Brighton & Hove, Brighton and Hove	World Art and Anthropology Collections Held by Royal Pavilion and Museums Brighton & Hove	South East	1998
Shakespeare Birthplace Trust and the Royal Shakespeare Company, Stratford-upon-Avon	The Shakespeare Collection	Midlands	2005
Sir John Soane's Museum, London	Sir John Soane's Museum Collection	London	1999
Southampton City Council Arts & Heritage, Southampton	Fine Art Collections Held by Southampton City Council Arts & Heritage	South West	1998
Southampton City Council Arts & Heritage, Southampton	Archaeology Collections Held by Southampton City Council Arts & Heritage	South West	1998
Spalding Gentlemen's Society	Spalding Gentlemen's Society - Original Collection	Midlands	2023
SS Great Britain, Bristol	The SS Great Britain Collection	South West	2014
St John's College, University of Cambridge, Cambridge	The Old Library Collection Cambridge	South East	2005
Staffordshire and Stoke-on-Trent Archive Service, Stafford	Staffordshire and Stoke-on-Trent Archive Service Collections	Midlands	2011
Stoke-on-Trent Museums, Stoke-on-Trent	The Stoke Museums Service Collections	Midlands	1997
Telegraph Museum Porthcurno, Porthcurno	Core Collection of Submarine Telegraphy Objects & the Historic Archive Collections of Key International Telegraph Cable Companies	South West	2009
The Box (Plymouth Museums Galleries Archives), Plymouth	The Cottonian Collection	South West	1998
The Brontë Society, Haworth, Bradford	The Brontë Parsonage Museum Collection	North	2023
The Canal and River Trust, Ellesmere Port	Canal and River Trust Collections at National Waterways Museum - Ellesmere Port and National Waterways Museum Gloucester	South West	1998
The Cheltenham Trust, Cheltenham	Arts and Craft Collection at The Wilson	South West	1998
The Kimmeridge Trust, Kimmeridge	The Etches Collection Museum of Jurassic Marine Life	South West	2020
The Mass Observation Archive, Brighton and Hove	The Mass Observation Archive	South East	2005
The Postal Heritage Trust, London	The Records Relating to the Operation, Policy, Development and Social Impact of the British Post Office from 1636 to the resent Day (Held By the Royal Mail Archive)	London	2005
The Royal Artillery Museum, Salisbury	The Royal Artillery Collection	South West	1999
The Salisbury and South Wiltshire Museum Trust, Salisbury	The Salisbury Museum Archaeology Collection	South West	1998
The Stained Glass Museum, Ely	The Stained Glass Museum	South East	2025
The Tank Museum, Bovington Camp	The Tank Museum Collection	South West	1998
The Weiner Holocaust Library, London	The Weiner Holocaust Library Collection	London	2017
The Wordsworth Trust, Grasmere	The Wordsworth Trust Collection	North	1997
Torbay Museums Trust, Torquay	Quaternary Cave Collection & Archive	South West	2016
Tullie House Museum and Art Gallery, Carlisle	The Natural Science Collections at Tullie House Museum and Art Gallery	North	2018
Tyne & Wear Archives & Museums, Newcastle upon Tyne	Shipbuilding, Maritime & Maritime Trade Archive Collections	North	2006
Tyne & Wear Archives & Museums and Sunderland Museums & Heritage Service, Newcastle and Sunderland	Science and Technology Collections	North	1997
Tyne & Wear Archives & Museums and Sunderland Museums & Heritage Service, Newcastle and Sunderland	Fine and Decorative Art Collections	North	1998
Tyne & Wear Archives & Museums and Sunderland Museums & Heritage Service, Newcastle and Sunderland	Natural Sciences Collections	North	1998
Unilever Art, Archives & Records Management, Port Sunlight	The Archive of the United Africa Company	North	2005
University College London Culture, Petrie Museum of Egyptian Archaeology, London	Petrie Museum of Egyptian Archaeology Collection	London	1998
University of Birmingham Libraries, Special Collection, Birmingham	Mingana Collection of Middle Eastern Manuscripts	Midlands	2005
University of Cambridge Museums & Botanic Garden, Cambridge	Fitzwilliam Museum Collection	South East	1997
University of Cambridge Museums & Botanic Garden, Cambridge	Museum of Archaeology and Anthropology Collections	South East	1997
University of Cambridge Museums & Botanic Garden, Cambridge	Whipple Museum of the History of Science Collections	South East	1997
University of Cambridge Museums & Botanic Garden, Cambridge	Cambridge University Museum of Zoology Collection	South East	1998
University of Cambridge Museums & Botanic Garden, Cambridge	Sedgwick Museum Collection	South East	1998
University of Nottingham Libraries (Manuscripts & Special Collections), Nottingham	The Portland (London) Collection; Portland of Welbeck Collection and Newcastle of Clumber Papers	Midlands	2005
University of Nottingham Libraries (Manuscripts & Special Collections), Nottingham	DH Lawrence Collection	Midlands	2008
University of Reading (Special Collections), Reading	The Beckett Collection	South East	2005
University of Reading (Special Collections), Reading	Archive of British Publishing and Printing	South East	2006
University of Reading, Museum of English Rural Life, Reading	The Museum of English Rural Life Archive, Library and Object Collections	South East	1997
University of Bristol, Bristol	University of Bristol Theatre Collection	South West	2019
Weald and Downland Living Museum, Singleton, Chichester	Weald and Downland Living Museum Collection	South East	1998
Wellcome Trust, London	The Wellcome Library	London	2005
Westminster City Archives, City of Westminster	Art and Design Collection	London	2005
Whitworth Art Gallery, University of Manchester, Manchester	Whitworth Art Gallery Collection of Textiles and Wallpaper	North	1997
Whitworth Art Gallery, University of Manchester, Manchester	Whitworth Art Gallery Collection of Fine Art	North	1998
William Morris Gallery, London	William Morris and Morris & Co. collection	London	2017
Wiltshire Museum, Devizes	Wiltshire Museum Collections	South West	1997
York Museums Trust, York	York Museums Trust Collections	North	1997

== See also ==
- Designated landmark (US)
- Designated place (Canada)
- List of libraries in the United Kingdom
