= Durham Museum =

Durham Museum may refer to

- Durham Museum, Durham in the United Kingdom
- Durham University Museum of Archaeology in the United Kingdom
- Durham Museum, Omaha, Nebraska in the United States

== See also ==
- List of museums in County Durham
- Category:Museums in Durham, North Carolina
