= St Michael's Abbey, Farnborough =

Abbey in Hampshire, England

Saint Michael's Abbey
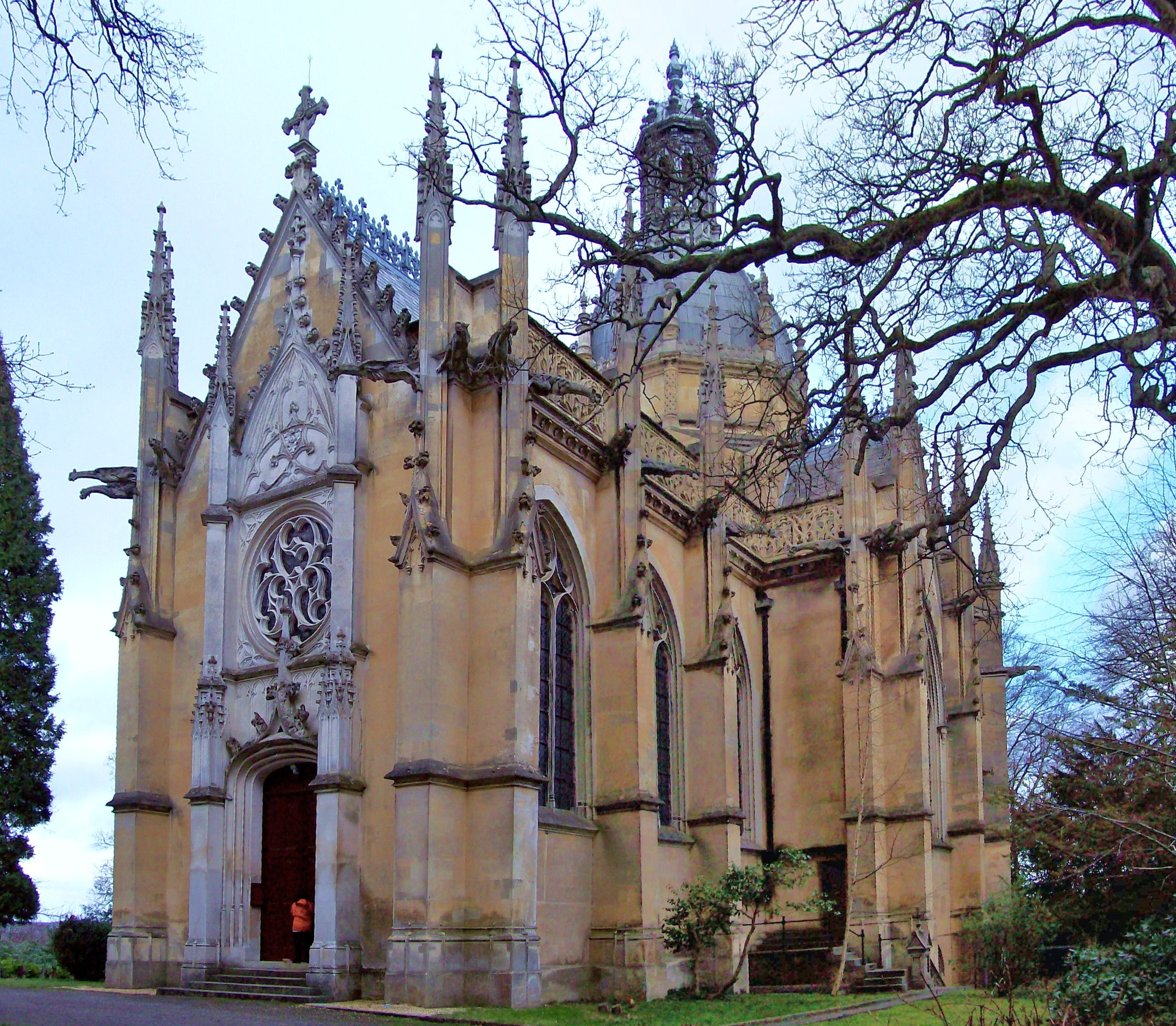
- Saint Michael's Abbey Church

- Location within Hampshire

Monastery information
- Other name: Farnborough Abbey
- Order: Order of Saint Benedict
- Established: 1881
- Dedication: Saint Michael the Archangel
- Diocese: Portsmouth
- Controlled churches: Saint Michael's Abbey Church

People
- Founder: Empress Eugénie
- Abbot: Dom Cuthbert Brogan
- Important associated figures: Emperor Napoleon III; Empress Eugénie; Napoléon, Prince Imperial

Site
- Location: Farnborough, Hampshire, United Kingdom
- Coordinates: 51°17′48″N 0°44′59″W
- Grid reference: SU873560
- Public access: Yes
- Website: https://farnboroughabbey.org

Saint Michael's Abbey (French: Abbaye Saint-Michel) is a Benedictine abbey in Farnborough, Hampshire, England, which belongs to the English Province of the Subiaco Cassinese Congregation. The small community is known for its liturgy (which is sung in Latin and Gregorian chant), its pipe organ, and its liturgical publishing and printing. This abbey is also known for enshrining a pontifically crowned image of Saint Joseph.

== History ==
Following the fall of the Second French Empire in 1870, Napoleon III (1808–1873), his wife Empress Eugénie (1826–1920) and their son the prince imperial (1856–1879) were exiled from France and took up residence in England at Camden Place in Chislehurst, Kent, where Napoleon III died in 1873. He was originally buried at St Mary's Church in Chislehurst. Following the death of the prince imperial in 1879, the grief-stricken Empress Eugénie set about establishing a monument to her family.

She founded the abbey in 1881 as a mausoleum for her husband and son, wishing that the burial site should be a place of prayer and silence. The abbey included an imperial crypt, modelled on the crypt of Saint-Denis basilica near Paris, where the emperor had originally desired to be buried. Empress Eugénie was later buried alongside her husband and son. All three rest in granite sarcophagi that were provided by Queen Victoria.

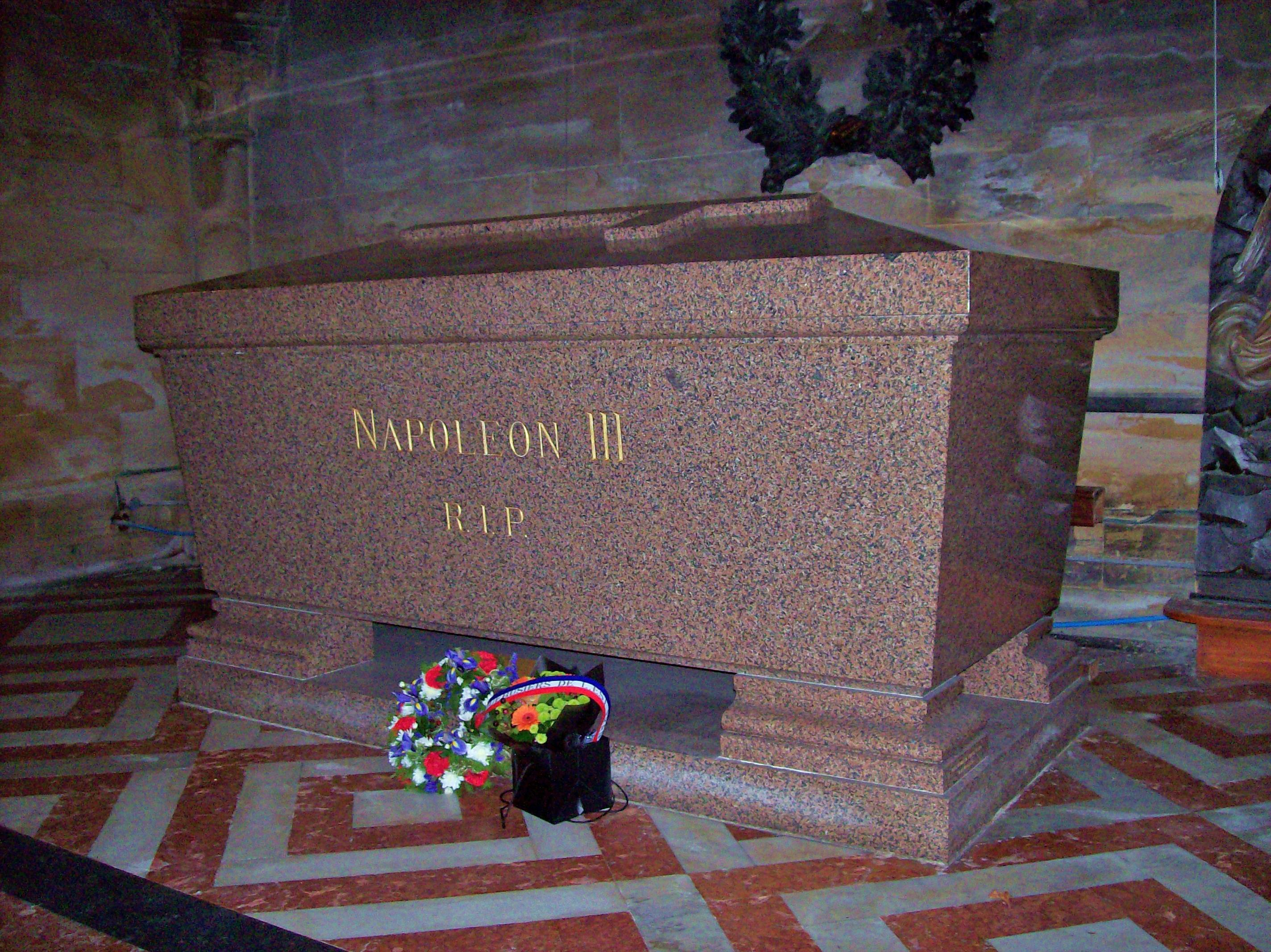
The sarcophagus of Emperor Napoleon III

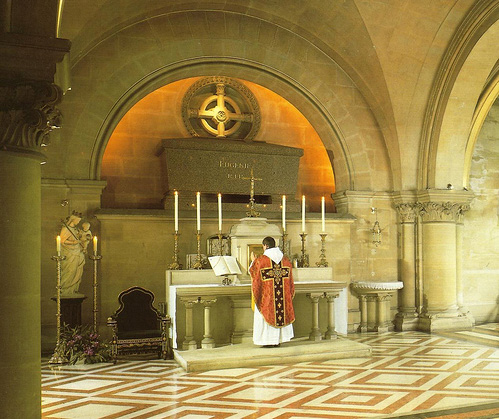
The sarcophagus of Empress Eugénie

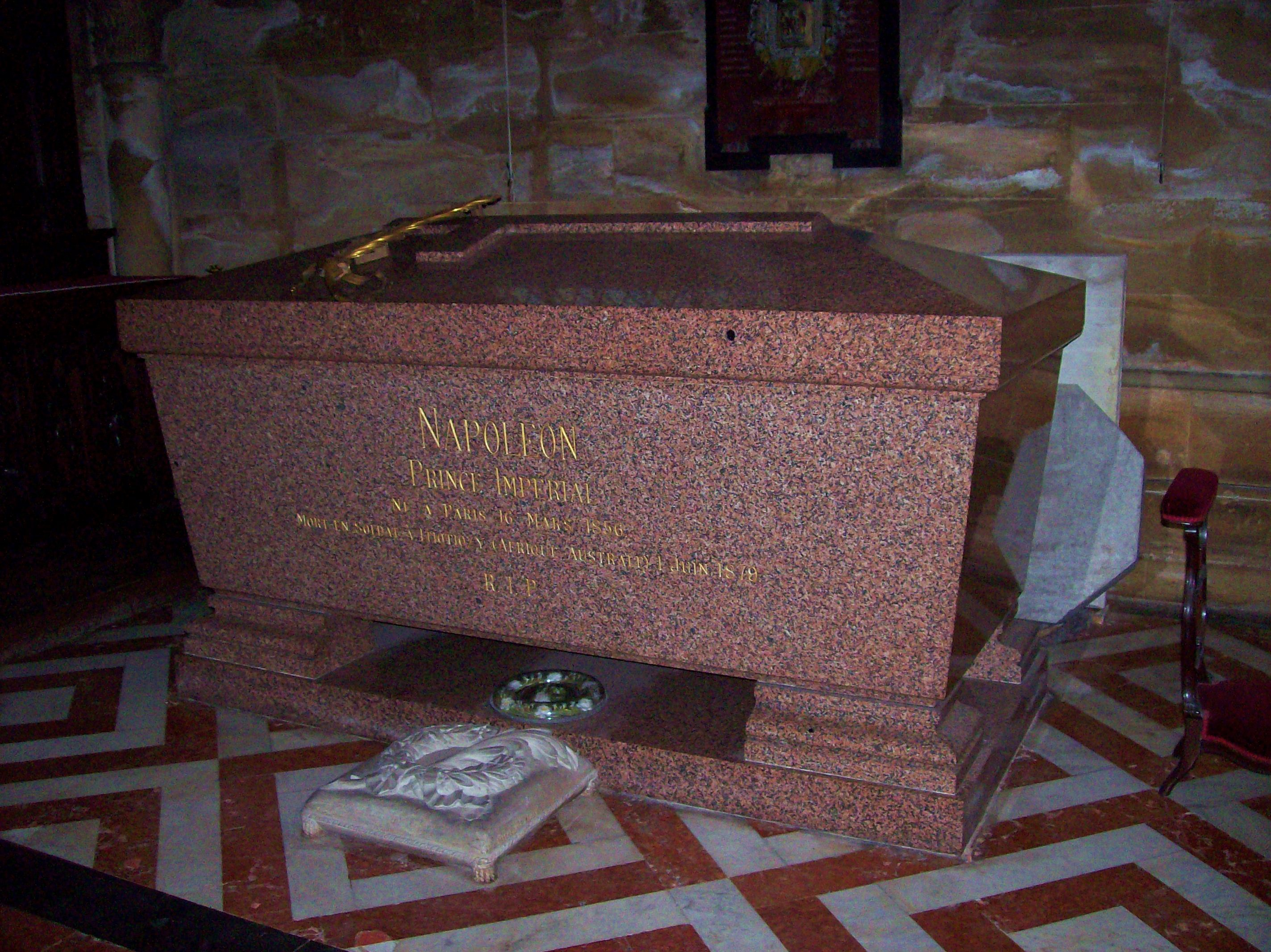
The sarcophagus of Napoléon, Prince Imperial

The abbey church itself was designed in an eclectic flamboyant gothic style by French architect Gabriel-Hippolyte Destailleur, and it contains the thigh bone of St Alban, the largest relic of the saint in England. After the church and monastery were founded, they were initially administered by Premonstratensian canons. In 1895, the empress replaced them with French Benedictine monks from St Peter's Abbey, Solesmes. Dom Fernand Cabrol, a scholar, became prior and afterwards abbot (1903), remaining in the post until his death in 1937. Dom Henri Leclercq and a small group of French monks joined the house at the same time, and Leclercq and Cabrol collaborated for many years in scholarly endeavours. The medievalist and liturgist Dom André Wilmart (1876–1941) was a monk of the abbey.

The church's present two-manual organ was installed in 1905, built by Aristide Cavaillé-Coll & Company. The instrument's origins are unknown. Although installed after the death of Cavaillé-Coll, it bears his name rather than that of his successor, Charles Mutin, and the internal works are of a quality which identifies this model with the highest standards of workmanship of that company.

The community, once known for its scholarly writing and musical tradition of Gregorian chants, became depleted in number by 1947, and most of the remaining monks dispersed to houses of the Solesmes Congregation, in particular Quarr Abbey. Farnborough was once more resettled, this time by a small group of English monks from Prinknash Abbey in Gloucestershire. The last French monk, Dom Leopold Zerr, for many years the abbey's organist, died in 1956. In 2006, the community elected the first English abbot of Farnborough, Dom Cuthbert Brogan.

== Catholic National Library ==
The Catholic Central Library was set up by the Catholic Truth Society after the First World War. It was maintained for many years by the Graymoor Friars in Westminster until they were obliged to withdraw. It moved into the care of St Michael's Abbey in 2007 for a probationary period pending a final decision on its future. In 2007, it was renamed the Catholic National Library, and it is one of the finest collections of Roman Catholic books in England. In 2015, the collection was relocated to Durham University Library.

== National Shrine to Saint Joseph ==
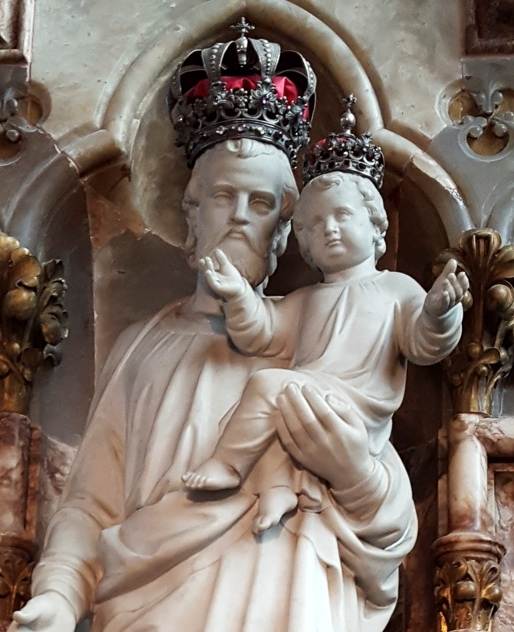
The statue of Saint Joseph was granted a canonical coronation by Pope Pius IX on 13 April 1874.

The National Shrine to Saint Joseph at Saint Michael's Abbey is cared for by the monks of Farnborough. A statue of Saint Joseph in a side chapel to the right of the high altar in the monastery church initially belonged to the Mill Hill Fathers, founded by Herbert Vaughan in 1866. At Vaughan's request, Pope Pius IX granted a canonical coronation for the statue, conducted by Henry Cardinal Manning on the occasion of the dedication of the chapel of St Joseph's College on 13 April 1874.

The Missionary Institute of London was established in the late 1960s to consolidate training facilities for the various mission societies in Britain. St Joseph's College was closed in 2006. The property was subsequently sold, and the Society relocated to Maidenhead. Farnborough Abbey agreed to receive the Shrine's statue and altars, and the present National Shrine was erected in 2008. (A second statue of St Joseph, formerly at the entrance to the Mill Hill property, was sent to the shrine of Our Lady of Walsingham.)

== St Michael's Abbey Press ==
Saint Michael's Abbey Press prints greeting cards and books.
