= National Museums Scotland =

Public museum agency in Scotland

Coordinates: 55.947°N 3.189°W

National Museums Scotland Taighean-tasgaidh Nàiseanta na h-Alba

Non Departmental Public Body overview
- Formed: 1 October 1985
- Preceding agencies: National Museum of Antiquities of Scotland; Royal Scottish Museum
- Jurisdiction: Scotland
- Headquarters: Chambers Street; Edinburgh; EH1 1JF
- Employees: 401
- Minister responsible: Fiona Hyslop, Cabinet Secretary for Culture, Europe and External Affairs
- Non Departmental Public Body executives: Bruce Minto OBE, Chairman of the Board of Trustees; Dr Chris Breward, Director of National Museums Scotland
- Child agencies: National Museum of Scotland; National Museum of Flight; National Museum of Rural Life; National War Museum
- Website: www.nms.ac.uk

Footnotes
- Charity registered in Scotland (No.SC01113)

National Museums Scotland (NMS; Scottish Gaelic: Taighean-tasgaidh Nàiseanta na h-Alba) is an executive non-departmental public body of the Scottish Government. It runs the national museums of Scotland.

NMS is one of the country's National Collections, and holds internationally important collections of natural sciences, decorative arts, world cultures, science and technology, and Scottish history and archaeology.

== List of national museums ==
- The National Museum of Scotland, comprising two linked museums on Chambers Street, in the Old Town of Edinburgh:
  - The Museum of Scotland - concerned with the history and people of Scotland
  - The Royal Museum - a general museum encompassing global geology, archaeology, natural history, science, technology and art
- The National Museum of Flight, at East Fortune, East Lothian
- The National Museum of Rural Life, at Wester Kittochside farm, in South Lanarkshire (previously the Museum of Scottish Country Life, previously the Scottish Agricultural Museum)
- The National War Museum, at Edinburgh Castle

== Other collections ==
The main storage building at the National Museums Collection Centre, at Granton in Edinburgh, opened in 1996. It is open to the public for guided tours. A new storage building has been constructed, which houses the textile and costume collections, including the Jean Muir Collection of 20th century costume and accessories.

The National Museum of Costume was located at Shambellie House, in New Abbey, Dumfries and Galloway, Scotland. In January 2013, National Museums Scotland announced that the National Museum of Costume was to close and the site would not reopen for 2013.

== Trustees ==
National Museums Scotland is Scotland's national museum service, governed by a board of trustees. It is a non-departmental public body, funded by the Education and Lifelong Learning Directorate of the Scottish Government.

== Notable items in the national collections ==
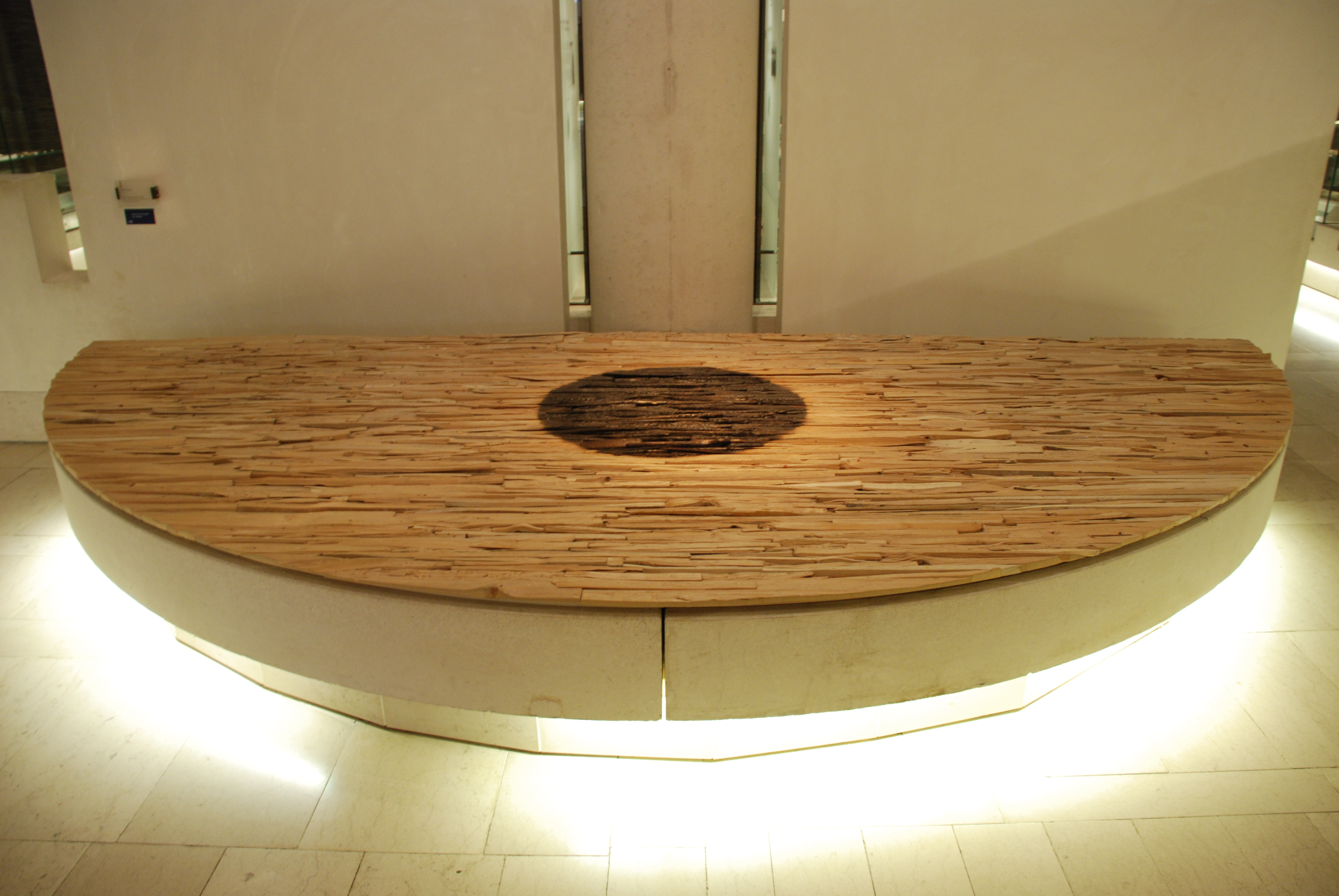
Hearth by Andy Goldsworthy, commissioned for the Early Scottish Peoples exhibit under the management former NMS Keeper of Archaeology, Dr David Clarke.

The official website lists the following exhibits as being the highlights of its collections:

- Assyrian relief of King Ashurnasirpal II and a court official, from the North-West Palace of Ashurnasirpal at Nimrud, excavated by Austen Henry Layard in the 1840s; the medical pioneer James Young Simpson gave the panel to the Society of Antiquaries of Scotland, who passed it into the national collection
- Boulton & Watt engine
- Bute mazer (also referred to as the Bannatyne mazer)
- Calcite crystal, found in 1927 at the New Glencrieff mine at Wanlockhead on the Leadhills ore field, "an excellent example of a complex doubly terminated scalenohedral crystal" (see Dogtooth spar)
- Concorde G-BOAA (Alpha Alpha)
- Dolly the sheep
- Galloway Hoard
- Hunterston Brooch
- Lewis chessmen
- One of the three skins left of the Mauritius blue pigeon
- Monymusk reliquary
- Prince Charlie's Targe and backsword
- Queen Mary harp
- Qurneh burial collection, discovered by Flinders Petrie on 30 December 1908, the only complete ancient royal Egyptian burial collection held outside Egypt
- Seringapatam sword, presented to David Baird by his field officers after the Battle of Seringapatam, in May 1799
- Silver travelling canteen of Prince Charles Edward Stuart
- Talnotrie Hoard
- Tea Service of the Emperor Napoleon

== See also ==
- Museums in Scotland
- National Museums of the United Kingdom
- National Museums Northern Ireland
