= Fernand Cabrol =

French abbot & scholar (1855–1937)

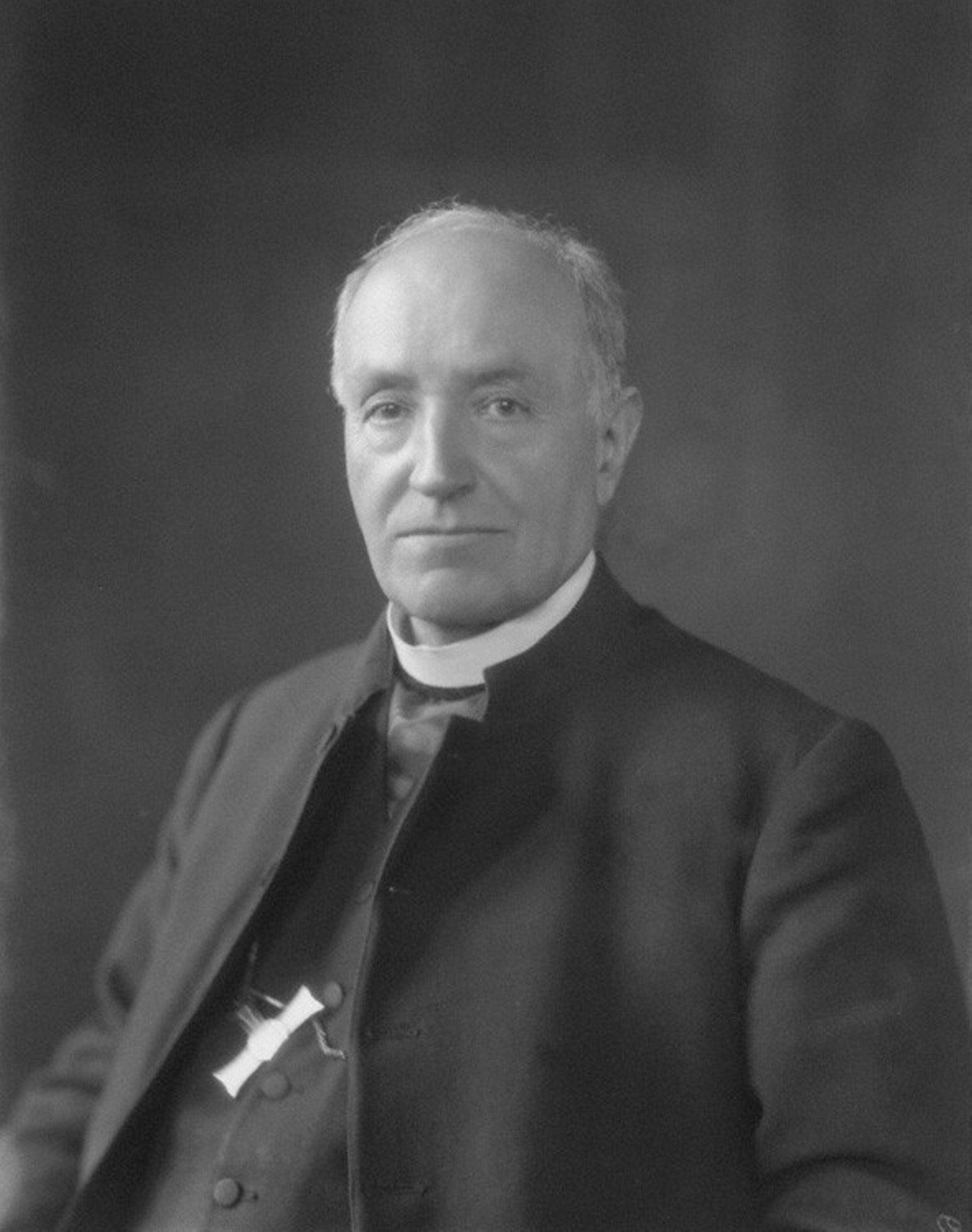
- Fernand Cabrol
- Born: 11 December 1855; Marseille, Bouches-du-Rhône, France
- Died: 4 June 1937 (aged 81); Farnborough, Hampshire, England
- Occupation: Benedictine abbot
- Known for: History of Christian worship

Fernand Cabrol (11 December 1855 – 4 June 1937) was a French Benedictine abbot and a scholar on the history of Christian worship.

== Life ==
Cabrol was born in Marseille. He studied at the College of Marseilles, and entered the Benedictine order in 1878. He was ordained in 1882. He was a professor of ecclesiastical history at Solesmes Abbey, where he became prior in 1890. From 1890 to 1895 he was a professor of archaeology and ecclesiastical history at the University of Angers.

He became prior of St Michael's Abbey in Farnborough, Hampshire in 1896, and abbot in 1903, remaining in the post until his death in 1937. A highly respected spiritual guide and scholar in his lifetime, he is now best known perhaps for being a co-founder of the Dictionnaire d'archéologie chrétienne et de liturgie, together with Henri Leclercq. Cabrol was president of the French section of the Eucharistic Congress of Westminster in 1908; an honorary member of the Academy of Mâcon, France, and honorary professor of the University of Angers. He contributed a number of articles to the Catholic Encyclopedia.

== Selected works of scholarship ==
Dictionnaire d'archéologie chrétienne et de liturgie

Cabrol was the founding editor and the majority of the volumes were edited by himself and Henri Leclercq and they also contributed articles to the encyclopaedia (Vol. 14, pt 2 & 15 were edited by H. I. Marrou). By 1953 the work was complete in 15 volumes, each of two parts.

Selected other works

- Livre de la prière antique, (1900)
- Monumenta ecclesiae liturgica (1900-1913) Vol. 1, 5 & 6 (no more published; editors: Cabrol, Leclercq & M. Ferotin). 4 vols. Paris: Firmin-Didot
- Relliquiae liturgicae vetustissimae: ex Ss. Patrum necnon Scriptorum Ecclesiasticorum monumentis selectae et publici juris factae curantibus Ferdinando Cabrol et Henrico Leclercq. 2 vols. Paris: Firmin-Didot, 1902, 1913 (edited with Henri Leclercq; Sectio 1-2: Ab aevo apostolico ad pacem Ecclesiae)

== Honors and awards ==
Knight of the Order of Legion of Honour

== See also ==
- Farnborough, Hampshire
- St Michael's Abbey, Farnborough
- Order of Saint Benedict
