= Henri Leclercq =

French priest (1869–1945)

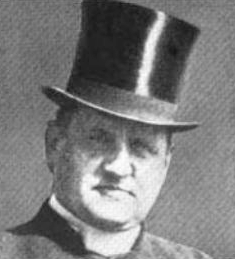
- Born: 4 December 1869; Tournai, Belgium
- Died: 23 March 1945 (aged 75); London, England
- Occupations: Theologian, historian

Henri Leclercq (4 December 1869 – 23 March 1945) was a French Catholic priest, theologian, and church historian who spent most of his adult life in the United Kingdom.

== Biography ==
Born in Tournai, Belgium, Leclercq attended the Catholic school there, but dropped out at the age of 17 when his mother moved him and his older sister to Paris; his father had died in 1874. They became French citizens. He did voluntary military service in France from 31 October 1889 to 31 October 1892, ending as Sergeant-fourrier; later, as a reservist, he rose to Sous-lieutenant.

In the fall of 1893 Leclercq entered the Benedictine Solesmes Abbey, and made his vows on 15 January 1895. With Prior Fernand Cabrol and other monks he was sent, in 1896, to Farnborough, in the south of England, where former empress Eugénie de Montijo had founded Saint Michael's Abbey. Here he was ordained as priest on 24 August 1898. Prompted by Cabrol and with his assistance (though the seeds were probably planted in Solesmes already) he began to write the substantial historical books he became known for, including the Dictionnaire d’archéologie chrétienne et de liturgie, which he edited by himself after the death of Cabrol. To complete these volumes he spent more and more time in London, in the reading room of the British Museum. This in turn led to an appointment in the Italian hospital of Queen's Square; later he moved to the house of the Congregation of Our Lady of Sion in Bayswater, and was canonically released from the Benedictines to join the clergy of the Roman Catholic Diocese of Westminster.

He contributed several articles to the Catholic Encyclopedia.

He died in London on 23 March 1945.

His works are judged variously by scholars, though they are considered useful still because of their wealth of primary material. His final manuscripts weren't published until after the end of World War II.

== Selected publications ==
See also Klauser, pp. 137–144.

- (with Fernand Cabrol) Relliquiae liturgicae vetustissimae, 2 vols., Paris 1902. 1913.
- Les martyrs. Recueil des pièces authentiques sur les martyrs depuis les origines du christianisme jusqu’au XXe siècle, 15 vols., Paris and Tours 1902–1924.
- (with Fernand Cabrol and others) Dictionnaire d’archéologie chrétienne et de liturgie, 15 double vols., Paris 1903–1953.
- L’Afrique chrétienne (Christian Africa)(Vol.1)(Vol. 2), Paris, (1904).
- L’Espagne chrétienne (Christian Spain), Paris, (1906).
- Carl Joseph Hefele, Histoire des conciles d’après les documents originaux. Nouvelle traduction française corrigée et augmentée par un religieux bénédictin (after vol. 2.2, par Henri Leclercq), 9 double vols., Paris 1907–1931.
- Manuel d’archéologie chrétienne depuis les origines jusqu’au VIIIe siècle, 2 vols., Paris 1907.
- Histoire de la regence pendant la minorite de Louis XV (History of the Regency During the Minority of Louis XV) (Vol. 1), (Vol. 2), Paris, (1922).
- "Histoire du déclin et de la chute de la monarchie française" (this is the "working title, the individual volumes appearing under their own names), 11 vols., Paris 1921–1940.
- Saint-Benoît-sur-Loire. Les reliques, le monastère, l’église, Paris 1925.
- La vie de Notre-Seigneur Jésus-Christ, Paris 1928.
- La vie chrétienne primitive, Paris 1928.
- L’ordre bénédictin, Paris 1930.
- A Chronicle of Social and Political Events from 1640 to 1914. In: Edward Eyre (ed.), European Civilization. Its Origin and Development, vol. 6, London 1937, pp. 1-717.
- Mabillon, 2 vols., Paris 1953. 1957.

== Bibliography ==
- Theodor Klauser: Henri Leclercq, 1869-1945. Vom Autodidakten zum Kompilator großen Stils. Münster 1977. ISBN 3-402-07079-0.
- Bernard Jossart: Henri Leclercq et les Bollandistes. Querelle autour des "Martyrs". In: Analecta Bollandiana 121 (2003) pp. 108–136.
