= Catholic National Library =

Coordinates: 51.2968°N 0.7499°W

The Catholic National Library (formerly the Catholic Central Library) is a large Roman Catholic library previously located at St Michael's Abbey in Farnborough, Hampshire, founded in 1912. In 2015 it was relocated to Durham University Library. It is known for its 70,000 books and periodicals, and the broad range of subjects it covers. It was a registered charity under English law.

The collection started in 1912 in the porch of St Mary Magdalene's Church in Bexhill-on-Sea, from the private library of an American, Mr William Reed-Lewis. It moved to Victoria, London in 1922 and was then established as the Catholic Central Library in 1936. In July 1959 the Friars of the Atonement took over its staffing and financing. In 1997 this building was sold off and the library's collection was threatened with being broken up. A campaign by some notable British Catholic writers and noblemen helped to keep the collection intact. From 1997 the running was transferred to a board of Trustees. Premises were leased in Lancing Street, London. In 2007 the collection was rehoused at St Michael's Abbey, Farnborough, changed its name from Catholic Central Library to Catholic National Library, and was once again open to visitors. Access to the library in Farnborough closed on 27 June 2014.
