= Norfolk Record Office =

Archive and county record office for Norfolk

Coordinates: 52.6144°N 1.3059°E

The Norfolk Record Office holds the archives for the County of Norfolk. The archives are held at Martineau Lane, Norwich, and run by Norfolk County Council. The Record Office also hosts the East Anglian Film Archive. The Norfolk Record Office holds over 1,000 years of records, including royal charters, title deeds, manorial court rolls, diaries, journals, pictures, minute books, and maps.
