= Hampshire Archives and Local Studies =

Coordinates: 51.0667°N 1.3186°W

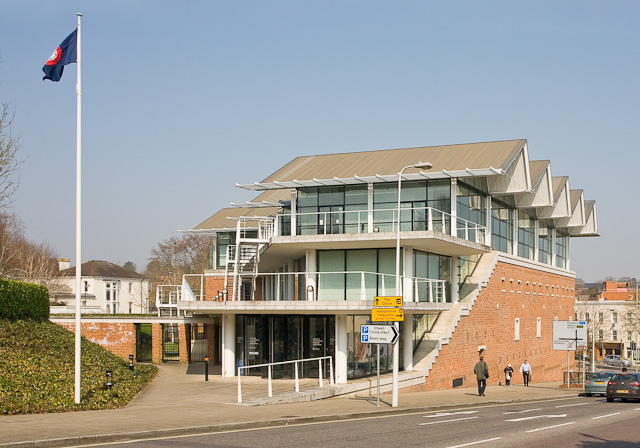
Hampshire Record Office

Hampshire Archives and Local Studies holds the archives for the county of Hampshire. The archives are located in Sussex Street, Winchester, and are run by Hampshire County Council.
