= SCONUL =

SCONUL (Society of College, National and University Libraries) is the professional association for academic and research libraries in the UK and Ireland.

SCONUL provides leadership and support to its community through advocacy, policy development, sharing knowledge and good practice and direct services to members.

== History ==
SCONUL was founded in 1950 as the Standing Conference of National and University Libraries. In 1994, when British polytechnics became universities, it merged with COPOL, the Council of Polytechnic Librarians, and in 2001 it extended its membership to libraries of Colleges of Higher Education and changed to its current name.

== Aims ==
SCONUL states its aims as:

For the benefit of our libraries and their users we aim:

- to drive towards a sustainable future for libraries in climate, social and economic terms.
- to support innovation and the process of transformation of libraries to maximise the benefits to their institutions and their users.
- to be an active agent for change, with and on behalf of our people, fostering an inclusive and diverse community and generating positive, creative solutions to sector challenges.
- to be a passionate advocate for the value of libraries so that decisions about them are made in full knowledge of that value.
- to be agile and responsive to the developing needs of our members and the changing environment in which they operate.
- to provide leadership to the sector and to use our influence to shape the conversation within and beyond our community, locally and internationally.

== Activities ==
SCONUL's activities include advocacy for the higher education library community, training and sharing best practice, making arrangements for reciprocal access to libraries, and the collection of statistics.

SCONUL groups are made up by representatives from the member institutions. Groups include the Content Strategy Group, Organisational Development Strategy Group, Technology and Markets Strategy Group, Horizon's Strategy Group.

== Structure ==
SCONUL members include libraries in higher education institutions (not only universities but also higher education colleges and specialist schools and conservatoires); the British Library and the National Libraries of Ireland, Scotland and Wales; and libraries in national museums and other specialist institutions, irrespective of size and mission.

It is governed by its members, whose representatives meet twice a year, and between meetings by an elected Executive Board. SCONUL is a registered charity.

The SCONUL Executive Director, from 13 September 2010, is Ann Rossiter and the SCONUL office is based at 94 Euston Street, London, UK, NW1 2HA.
