= City of Westminster Archives Centre =

Archive centre in London, England

Coordinates: 51.497559°N 0.130140°W

The Westminster Archives Centre is the archive centre for the City of Westminster, London, located at 10 St Ann's Street, London SW1P 2DE England.

== Local archives ==
Archives and library sources are available free of charge for the City of Westminster, covering Marylebone, Paddington and Westminster.

- Building History including texts for architecture and building historians
- London Theatre History
- Family History
- Poor Law references about the history of charity, poverty, and welfare in London

== Visitors ==
Visitors must be members of Westminster Libraries and Archives in order to visit the City of Westminster Archives Centre. Membership is free, and visitors can join when they visit.

== See also ==
- National Archives
- The National Archives (United Kingdom)
