= Durham University Library =

Academic library in Durham, England

Coordinates: 54°46′5″N 1°34′24″W

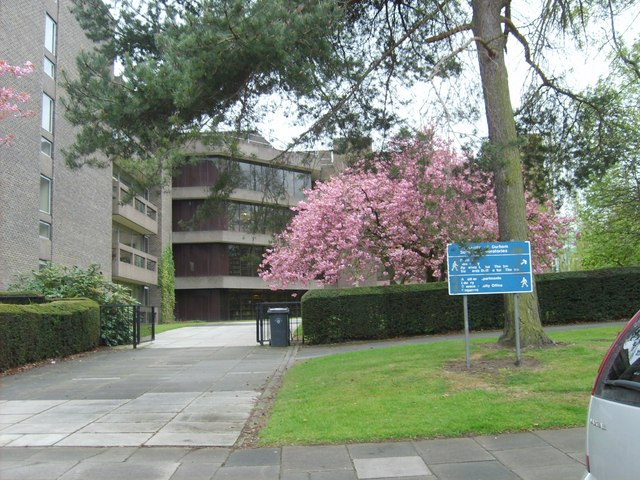
- The Bill Bryson Library in 2007
- Location: Durham, England, United Kingdom
- Type: University Library
- Established: 1833
- Branches: 6 (excluding college libraries)

Collection
- Items collected: Books, journals, newspapers, magazines, sound and music recordings, patents, databases, maps, Parliamentary papers, Mediaeval Seals, European Union Papers, Ecclesiastical Records, Middle East Papers, drawings and manuscripts
- Size: >1,637,000 printed items, 25,000 e-journals and more than 850,000 e-books. (Excluding college libraries).

Access and use
- Access requirements: Open to all students of Durham; Students from universities within the SCONUL Vacation Access Scheme.; NHS Staff (Northern Region).; Certain external borrowers, alumni and fee-payers.

Other information
- Director: Stuart Hunt
- Website: durham.ac.uk/library

The Durham University Library is the centrally administered library of Durham University in England and is part of the university's Library and Collections department. Its two main libraries are Palace Green Library and the Bill Bryson Library. It was founded in January 1833 at Palace Green by a 160 volume donation by the then Bishop of Durham, William Van Mildert, and now holds over 1.6 million printed items. Since 1937, the university library has incorporated the historic Cosin's Library, founded by Bishop Cosin in 1669. Cosin's Library and the Sudan Archive held at Palace Green Library are designated collections under Arts Council England's Designation Scheme for collections of national and international significance; two collections at Durham University Oriental Museum (also part of Library and Collections), the Chinese collection and the Egyptian collection, are also designated.

The library is a member of the Society of College, National and University Libraries (SCONUL), Research Libraries UK and the Association of European Research Libraries. It partners with Durham Cathedral Library, Ushaw College Library and other Durham University collections in the Durham Residential Research Library.

== History ==
=== Cosin's Library ===
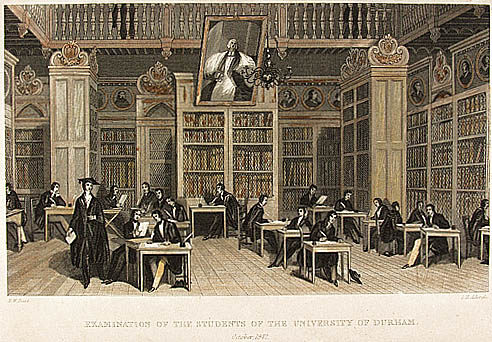
Examination in Cosin's Library, 1842

Cosin's Library was established in 1669 by Bishop John Cosin. The building was built in 1667–69 by the Quaker architect John Langstaffe specifically to house Cosin's collection of over 5,000 books. It was one of the first public libraries in the north of England and also one of the first libraries in England to adopt the new European style of having bookcases against the walls, leaving the central area of the library free for other uses. After the establishment of Durham University Library in 1833, a new gallery was constructed inside Cosin's Library to house them. Cosin's Library, and its collection of medieval manuscripts and early printed books came under the trusteeship of the university library in 1937.

Cosin's Library is a Grade II* listed building and an ancient monument, and is located inside the Durham Castle and Cathedral UNESCO World Heritage Site. The internal architecture and decoration are also of international importance. The original portrait panels located above the bookshelves were painted by Jan Baptist van Eerssell in 1668–1669. Further portraits hang in the library, including half portraits of English statesmen. Nearly three hundred years later, a former university librarian, David Ramage, completed Cosin's original plan for the library by painting further portrait panels for the smaller room added in 1670–1671.

=== Expansion on Palace Green ===
The university library initially used the new gallery installed in Cosin's Library. However, after it received Martin Routh's library in 1855 this space proved insufficient and it expanded into the upper floor of the Exchequer Building next door. Additional donations came from Bishop Edward Maltby in 1856 and Thomas Masterman Winterbottom in 1859.

At this time the area south of Cosin's Library on Palace Green was a stable yard. An 1857 Ordnance Survey map shows two of the stables – one on Palace Green and one behind the Diocesan Registry (built 1822; now the Music Library building) had been converted into lecture rooms. Cosin's Library was used at the time for examinations and convocations, but by 1880 the university had outgrown this space. In 1882, the stable block fronting onto Palace Green between Cosin's Library and the diocesan registry was demolished and replaced with a new two-storey perpendicular Tudor building by Sir Arthur Blomfield with two large lecture rooms – now the University Library building.

In 1929 the continued expansion of the library meant that even with the Exchequer Building there was insufficient room, and the ground floor lecture theatre was taken over by the library. The space between the lecture block and Cosin's Library, which had provided access to the stable yard, was filled in between 1935 and 1937, with the arch to the stable yard being replaced by the main entrance to the library. A further infill extension in 1950 covered the remaining area of the stable yard, linking a remaining stable block at the rear (west) of the site with the University Library building.

A major extension to the Palace Green Library in 1968 designed by architect George Pace provided a reading room and new storage space for the university library; this is now known as the Pace Building. In 1978 the Diocesan Registry building was taken over by the library, becoming the Music Library. With no possibility of further expansion on the peninsula, the decision was taken to extend the library building on the university's science site, which became the Main Library in 1983.

=== Recent history ===
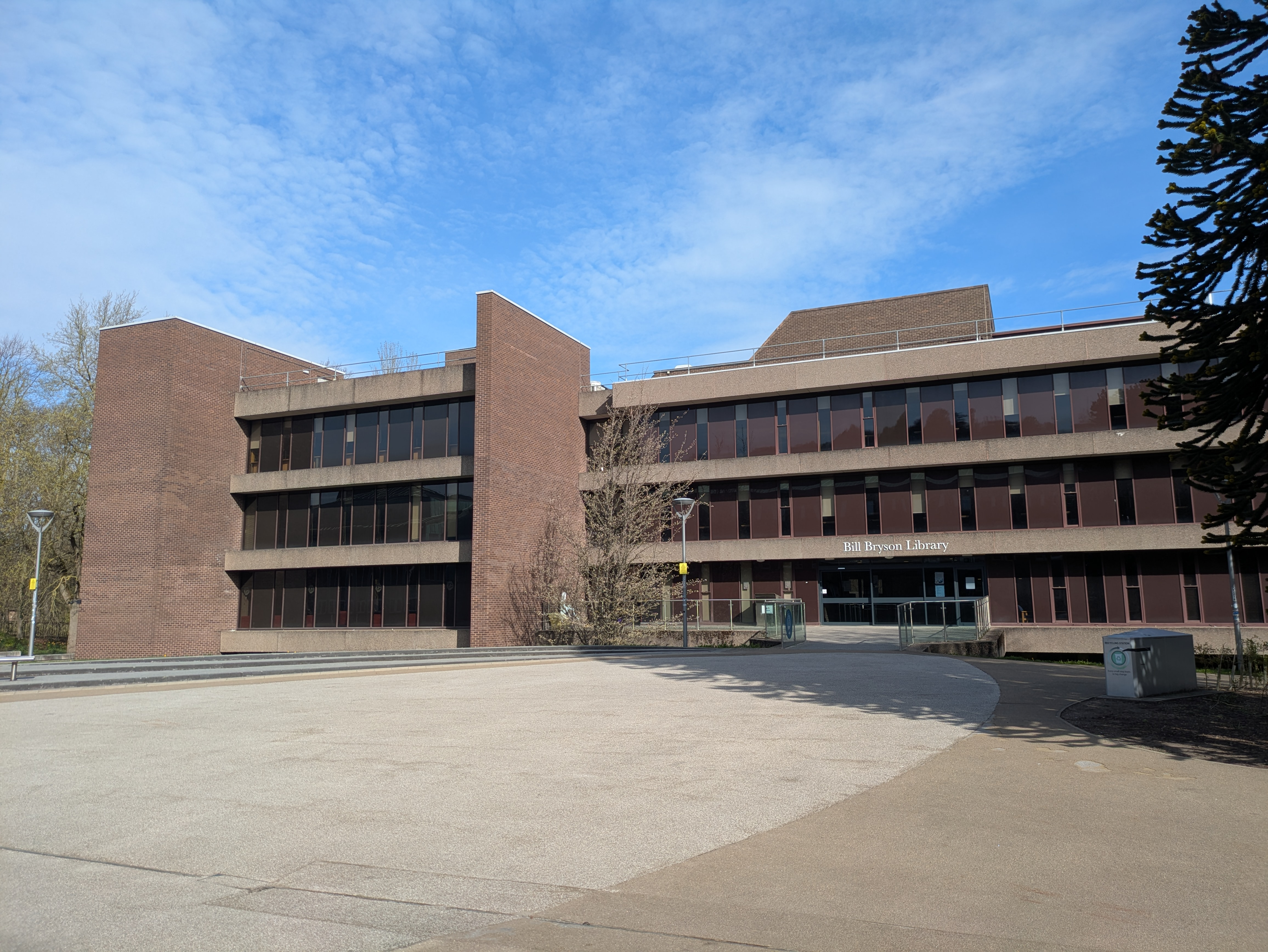
Bill Bryson Library

The university library introduced its first online circulation system in 1983. The Main Library won a SCONUL Library Design Award in 1988 and the online cataloguing of the library's stock beginning in 1990. In 1996 the Durham University Library joined Research Libraries UK.

The university library was expanded further with an extension of the Main Library in 1997, and in 1998 it became the first library to incorporate non-Roman scripts into its electronic catalogue system. In 2004, the Durham Cathedral Library became part of the university library's management system for circulation and lending.

In October 2005, the Museums, Libraries and Archives Council designated the collections in Cosin's Library, along with the Sudan Archive in the Palace Green Library, as having "outstanding national and international significance" in the first round of the Designation Scheme to cover libraries.

In 2010, the university launched a refurbishment of the Palace Green Library, including the construction of two galleries in the University Library building, designed in consultation with the Museums, Libraries and Archives Council to meet the standards required under the National Heritage Act 1980 and thus able to host major national exhibitions as well as displaying rare treasures from the library's own collection. The refurbishment also saw the music and law books, the last 'ordinary' books in Palace Green Library, relocated to the Bill Bryson Library. An alumni appeal raised £4.7 million towards this refurbishment.

A further major extension of the Main Library was opened by former Chancellor Bill Bryson in 2012, and the building was renamed the Bill Bryson Library.

In 2012, the library was part of a formal partnership with Durham Cathedral and the British Library to acquire the St Cuthbert Gospel, the oldest intact book in Europe. Under the partnership agreement, this is displayed equally at the British Library and in the north east of England. The St Cuthbert Gospel was displayed alongside the Lindisfarne Gospels and other treasures of St Cuthbert at Palace Green Library in 2013.

In the final stages of the Palace Green Library refurbishment in 2013, a café was constructed in a courtyard between the George Pace Building and the Music Library. During this work, 28 sets of human remains were discovered in a mass grave. These were identified as Scottish soldiers captured by Oliver Cromwell at the Battle of Dunbar in 1650 and subsequently imprisoned in Durham Cathedral. With estimates that as many as 1,700 prisoners may have died in Durham, and other skeletons having been unearthed during building works nearby in the 1940s, it is likely that many further bodies lie under the library buildings.

In 2014, the university's Museum of Archaeology (originally established in 1833) moved into a new gallery in Palace Green Library, open for free to the public.

Refurbishment of the 15th century Exchequer Building allowed out to be opened to public tours for the first time in 2017. Cosin's Library was also refurbished between 2020 and 2022.

In late 2022, the library launched the Legacies of Enslavement and Colonialism at Durham University research project as part of Durham's action plan under the Race Equality Charter (REC). This project, led by the University Archivist, is looking at potential historical links between Durham University and colonialism and slavery and whether the university derived any income from slavery. The library is also part of a second REC-linked project to assess how records and collections are cared for and curated.

In 2023, the library joined the SafePod Network, giving secure data access from a 'pod' installed in the Bill Bryson Library to sensitive datasets from the Office for National Statistics, the UK Data Service, the Health and Care Research Wales-funded Secure Anonymised Information Linkage Databank, the Scottish Government, and Health and Social Care Northern Ireland's Honest Broker Service. The same year, the School of Education relocated from Leazes Road to Lower Mountjoy, leading to the closure of the Leazes Road Study Space.

In January 2025, it was revealed by university newspaper Palatinate that the Bill Bryson Library has the shortest opening hours of any Russell Group university. In February 2025, the university announced that the Bill Bryson Library will not remain open overnight this term following the student petition, organised by student Avesta Afshari-Mehr, which acquired over 2,000 signatures from students. The petition urged the University to reconsider its decision to cut back 24 hour opening times this term. The University assured the university community that the Library will remain open 24/7 from Saturday 26rd April 2025 until Friday 23rd May 2025.

=== List of librarians ===
- 1832–1834 – Patrick George
- 1834–1855 – Charles Thomas Whitley
- 1856–1858 – Robert Healey Blakey
- 1858–1864 – Henry Frederick Long
- 1865–1868 – Francis Frederick Walrond
- 1869–1873 – Thomas Forster Dodd
- 1873–1901 – Joseph Thomas Fowler
- 1901–1934 – Edward Vazeille Stocks
- 1934–1945 – Henry Waldo Acomb
- 1940–1943 – Beatrice Thompson (Acting Librarian)
- 1945–1967 – David Goudie Ramage
- 1967–1989 – Agnes Maxwell McAulay
- 1989–2009 – John Tristan Dalton Hall
- 2009–2017 – Jon Purcell
- 2018–2023 – Liz Jane Waller
- 2023–present – Stuart Hunt

== Heritage, research and special collections ==
Palace Green Library houses the heritage and special collections

As part of its collection, the library contains a wealth of printed and manuscript material with a particular wealth of material from the medieval period and the Middle East along with materials from the North East. These include:

- Middle East and Islamic Studies collections: One of the most important collections in the UK, it contains over 50,000 monographs and over 2,500 periodicals covering the Ottoman Empire to ancient Mesopotamian archaeology to modern Persian literature.
- The Sudan Archive: founded in 1957, the year after Sudanese independence, to collect and preserve the papers of administrators from the Sudan Political Service, missionaries, soldiers, business men, doctors, agriculturalists, teachers and others who had served or lived in the Sudan (now Sudan and South Sudan) during the Anglo-Egyptian Condominium (1898–1955). There is a significant amount of Mahdist material as well as papers relating to the military campaigns of the 1880s and 1890s, while in recent years, the scope of the Archive has extended to the period after independence and now contains material up to the present day. The Archive also holds substantial numbers of papers relating to Egypt, the Arabian Peninsula, Palestine, Transjordan, Syria, and African states bordering on Sudan and South Sudan. Most of the material is in English, with a small amount in Arabic. In 2005 the collection was accorded with designated status by the Museums, Libraries and Archives Council.
- Abbas Hilmi II Papers, Khedive of Egypt 1892–1914.
- Bamburgh Library Collection: Created in 1958, the collection holds some 8,500 manuscript and print titles, with 16 incunabula across a variety of subject areas. The collection was largely acquired during the mid-seventeenth and mid-eighteenth centuries by the Archbishop of York, John Sharp (1644–1714), along with three generations of the Sharp Family. The collection contains the 1533 edition of the Psalms from Freiburg and Joannes Guinterius's Anatomicarum institutionum libri.
- Bibliotheca Episcopalis Dunelmensis (Cosin Collection): Founded in 1669 by the then Bishop John Cosin. The collection contains over 5,000 titles, including nine incunabula, over 600 foreign 16th-century titles. The collection is largely in French or German and based on theological issues such as Canon law and liturgy. The collection contains Cosin's 1568 Zürich edition of Heinrich Bullinger's De origine erroris.
- Howard Collection: Contains the library of Lord William Howard of Naworth. The collection is largely of Roman Catholic texts, including a Vienna imprint of Stanislaus Hosius's Confessio catholicae fidei christiana of 1561.
- Quakerism Collection: Acquired in 1972 from the surviving collection of the Sunderland Preparative Meeting of the Society of Friends Library and contains approx. 880 printed volumes and a number of related manuscripts.
- Kellett Collection: Principally composed of the library of C. E. de M. Kellett, focusing on medicine and medical teaching. The collection contains a number of pre-18th century along with 16th and 17th-century works, including Aristotle's Totius naturalis philosophiae Aristotelis paraphrases and Galen's De sanitate tuenda alongside Vidius's Chirurgia and Estienne's De Dissectione.
- Routh Collection: Is the library of Martin Joseph Routh, president of Magdalen College, Oxford. The collection is in two sections the first on early Church Fathers entitled Reliquiae sacrae and his edition of Gilbert Burnet's History of his own time. Of the incunabula one of the most notable is Bernhard von Breidenbach's Itinerarium in terram sanctam. The collection contains a wealth of dating from the 14th century.
- St Chad's Collection: Deposited by St Chad's College, it contains a number of 16th and 17th-century imprints, including Quintus Aurelius Symmachus's Epistolae familiares and the Concilia omnia.
- Basil Bunting Poetry Archive: Acquired in 1987 with grants from the National Heritage Memorial Fund and the Purchase Grant Fund. It is the most extensive collection in the UK of the work of Basil Bunting (1900–1985) and of material relating to him.
- Pratt Green Collection: Is a collection founded in 1987 and contains an extensive array of hymns and hymnology. The collection was with a gift from the Pratt Green Trustees and contains work from the distinguished hymn writer, Fred Pratt Green.
- Malcolm MacDonald Papers: Papers covering the life of the former politician and chancellor of the university.
- Earl Grey Collection: Contains extensive works and papers of the former prime minister.
- Durham University Observatory Records: Contains the second-longest meteorological record in the UK from 1839 to 1953, also contains records of other local observatories.
- Medieval Seals: The collection contains many Royal and ecclesiastic devices, including Duncan I king of Scots, Henry III king of England, first great seal, and the seal of Pope Martin IV.
- Catholic National Library: Founded in 1912 and containing more than 70,000 books and over 150 runs of periodicals, this closed in 2014 due to a shortage of volunteer staff. It was transferred to Durham in 2015 following an agreement between the university and the Catholic National Library's trustees.

Other important historical items include two copies of the first issue of the first edition of Isaac Newton's Principia, one signed by John Dalton.

== Facilities ==
University libraries (red) and study centres (blue) within Durham

The library has two major libraries – the Bill Bryson Library, which is the main university library, and Palace Green Library, which houses the special collections and archives. A third library, the International Study Centre Library, is located on the Queen's Campus in Stockton-upon-Tees, and is primarily used by students and staff at the International Study Centre.

As well as the libraries, there are 450 study spaces in the Lower Mountjoy Teaching and Learning Centre, as well as a study hub in Durham University Business School (only accessible by students at the business school) that includes a reference collection of core texts. Additionally, many colleges have their own libraries, although these college libraries are managed independently from the University's main library.

Other resources include the Durham Cathedral archive at 5, The College, college libraries at twelve of the colleges, Durham Cathedral Library and Ushaw College Library. There are also additional study spaces (not considered library locations) in Elvet Riverside, the Mathematical Sciences and Computer Sciences Building (Upper Mountjoy), Dunelm House (students' union) and the Calman Learning Centre (Lower Mountjoy).

=== Bill Bryson Library ===
The Bill Bryson Library (known informally as the "Billy B"), on the university's Lower Mountjoy campus, was built in three stages between the 1960s and 1990s, when the west wing was added. The original science library, opened in 1965, was designed by William Whitfield while the 1983 extension, which saw it become the university's main library, was by Harry Faulkner-Brown.

It was further extended in 2012 with the addition of a new east wing and the complete refurbishment of the rest of the library. This enabled the transfer of the music and law collections out of the Palace Green Library, allowing it to be dedicated to archives and special collections, and also provided additional study spaces for students. Following the extension and refurbishment, the Bill Bryson library has 11,500 m^{2} (124,000 ft^{2}) of floor space and 23,000 m (75,000 ft) of open shelving. There are 1,800 individual and group study spaces in the library as of February 2023. From 2019 to 2025, the library was open 24 hours a day, seven days a week, during the academic year, with staffed services available 8am to 10pm on weekdays and 9am to 10pm at weekends. From January 2025 the opening hours were reduced to 8am to midnight on weekdays and 9am to 10pm at weekends, in order to reduce energy consumption and costs, returning to 24-hour opening for the exam period in the Easter term.

=== Palace Green Library ===
Palace Green Library, on Palace Green, consists of four main buildings: the 15th century, grade I listed Exchequer Building, the 17th century, grade II* listed Cosin's Library, the 19th century, grade II listed University Library, and the 20th century George Pace Building. All but the last of these face onto Palace Green, with the Pace Building being located at the top of the river bank behind the adjacent Music Library (the southern part of which is now the Music Technology Suite, part of the Department of Music). The library also occupies various other buildings on the site, including former stables and a coach house from before the university took occupation, and infill extensions from the 20th and 21st centuries. From 1833 to 1983, Palace Green Library was the main university library, with the last 'ordinary' books having been moved to the Bill Bryson library in 2011. Since then, Palace Green Library has been dedicated to archives and special collections.

The Exchequer Building houses the Bamburgh Library and the Routh Library, as well as digitisers and other equipment for heritage science in the former dungeon. Cosin's Library houses Bishop Cosin's collection, with additions by his successors, along with books donated to the university in the 19th century by Bishop Maltby and Thomas Masterman Winterbottom. The University Library, originally built as lecture rooms by Sir Arthur Blomfield in 1882, now houses the Durham University Museum of Archaeology and the Durham Light Infantry gallery. The George Pace Building houses the Barker Research Library, containing the university archives and special collections, as well as the Palace Green Library study spaces. Palace Green Library also hosts the World Heritage Site Visitor Centre.

== Partnerships ==
=== Durham Residential Research Library ===
Plans to establish the first residential research library at a UK university, taking in the university's library and collections along with those of Ushaw College and Durham Cathedral, were announced in 2017.

In 2019 a visiting fellow at the residential research library from the University of Bristol found a royal charter of King John from 1200 in the archives of Ushaw College. The discovery made the national and international news.

The residential research library takes in numerous collections and archives across Durham, including:

- Palace Green Library
- Bill Bryson Library
- Durham University Oriental Museum
- Durham University Museum of Archaeology
- Durham University Western Art Collection
- Durham Castle Museum
- Durham Cathedral Library
- Other collections at Durham Cathedral
- Ushaw College's library and archives

These collections include over 400 manuscripts, 40,000 early and rare printed books, 5,300 m (17,400 ft) of archives, over 50,000 objects and 200 paintings.

There are three endowed visiting fellowship schemes at the residential research library: the Barker fellowship, covering research on any of the collections, the Lendrum fellowship for research specifically on the medieval Durham Priory library, and the Holland fellowship for PhD students. There are also Spanish Gallery Collection Research Fellowships, funded by the Centro de Estudios Europa Hispánica, which are offered jointly with the university's Zurbarán Centre in Bishop Auckland and are for research into the collection of the Spanish Gallery in Bishop Auckland.

=== Other partnerships ===
Durham University Library is a member of several organisation, including:

- The Association of European Research Libraries
- OCLC
- Research Libraries UK
- The SafePod Network
- Society of College, National and University Libraries
