= Durham Miners Heritage Centre =

Former mining museum in Durham, England

Coordinates: 54.7721°N 1.5945°W

A pit pony pulling a coal cart

The Durham Miners Heritage Centre was a museum, now closed, run by the Durham Miners Heritage Group at Neville's Cross, Durham, England. It had a display of coal mining memorabilia and an exhibition of art.

One of the main reasons for the display was to educate the next generation of children about the mining past of County Durham and to give opportunities to research coal mining history, especially local school groups in the area and visitors to the city.

The displays included mining pit lamps such as the famous Davy lamp, tools used in the mining trade and a selection of art by former miners. A computer facility showed photographs and there was also a section of books on mining.

== See also ==
- North East England Mining Archive and Resource Centre
- Rhondda Heritage Park in the old South Wales coalfield
