= Cosin's Library =

Library building in Durham, England

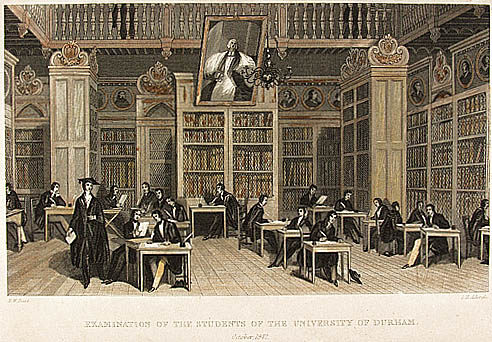
- An examination taking place in Cosin's Library, 1842
- 54.7747°N 1.5762°W
- Location: Palace Green, Durham, England, United Kingdom
- Type: Academic library
- Established: 1669
- Branch of: Durham University Library

Collection
- Items collected: Books, maps, prints, drawings and manuscripts
- Size: 5,000

Other information
- Website: cosinslibrary.webspace.durham.ac.uk

Listed Building – Grade II*
- Official name: Cosin's Library (University Library)
- Designated: 19 October 1962
- Reference no.: 1121382

Scheduled monument

Bishop Cosin's Library, originally the Episcopal Library or Bibliotheca Episcopalis Dunelmensis, is an historic library founded in 1669 in Durham, England. Owned by the University of Durham, the library is open to the public.

== History ==
=== Foundation ===
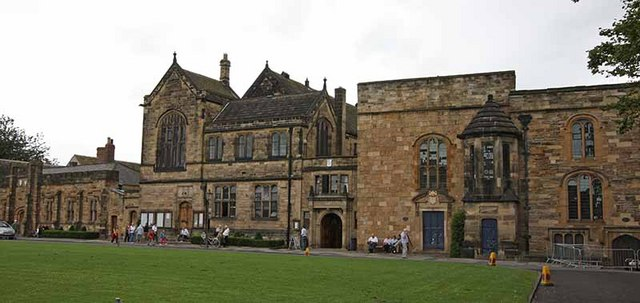
Cosin's library in Durham, centre right with flat roof, between the 19th-century university library, left, and Bishop Neville's 15th-century exchequer, right

John Cosin, a monarchist who was then master of Peterhouse, Cambridge, went into exile in Paris during the English Civil War, where he became acquainted with the Bibliothèque Mazarine, one of the earliest public libraries.

On the Restoration of the monarchy in 1660, Cosin returned to England, and shortly afterwards was appointed Bishop of Durham.

In Durham, he began a programme of improvements around Palace Green, including building the library, one of the first public libraries in northern England, for the use of clergy and gentlemen of the diocese.

It was constructed in 1667-8 by Cosin's Quaker architect, John Longstaffe, at a cost of £2500 (equivalent to £470,000 in 2025).

Its initial collection consisted of over 5,000 books collected by Bishop Cosin, including his own collection previously stored at Peterhouse. These books included a copy of William Shakespeare's First Folio, which Cosin had probably bought new in 1623 and is the only copy to have remained in the same personal collection since it was first purchased.

The original portrait panels located above the bookshelves were painted by Jan Baptist van Eerssell in 1668–1669. Further portraits hang in the library, including half portraits of English politicians.

=== Durham University ===
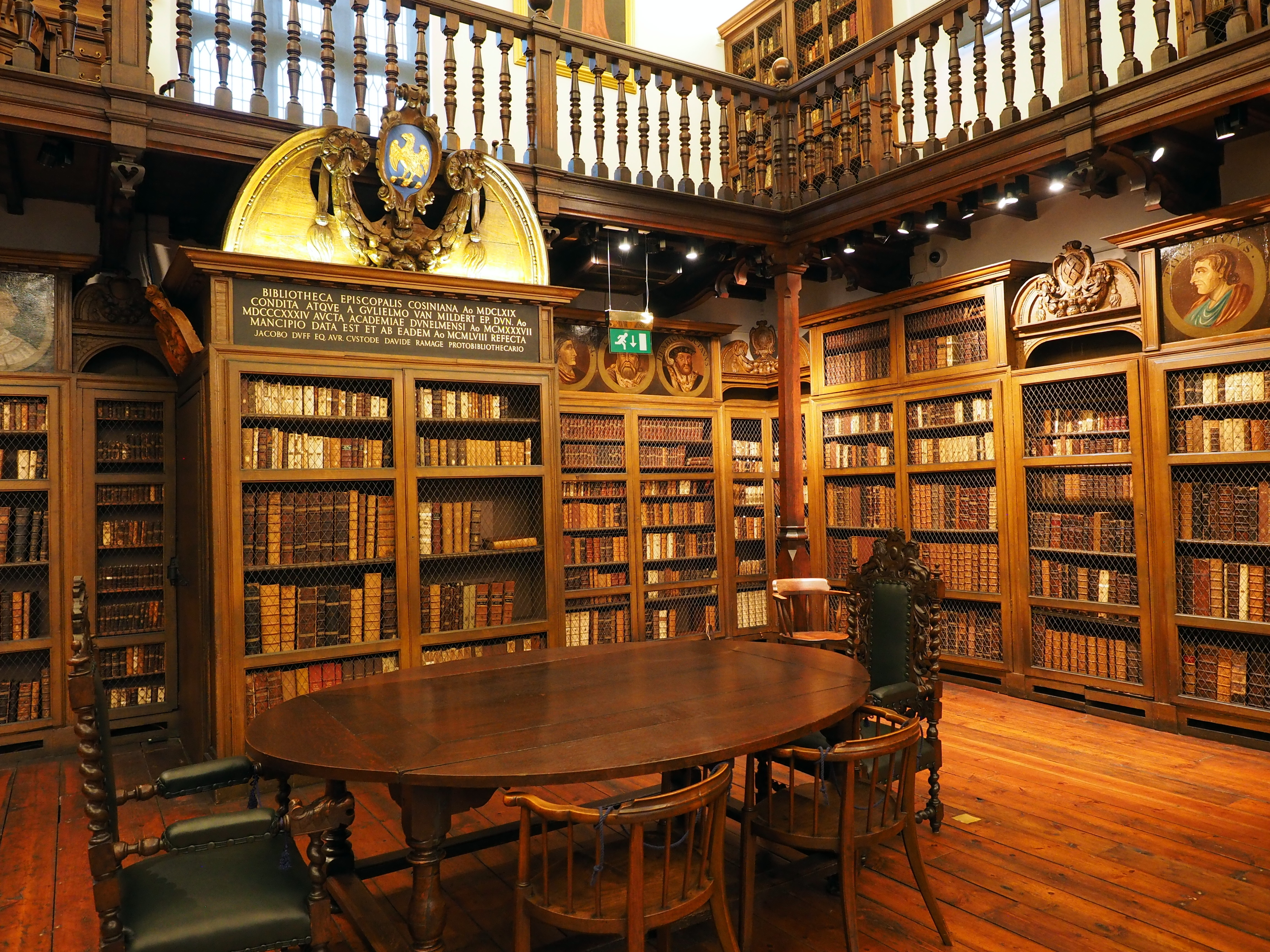
The interior of the library in 2022

At its foundation in 1833, Durham University was granted use of the library, and received a donation of books from Bishop William Van Mildert as the founding collection of the Durham University Library. A gallery was constructed in Cosin's Library to accommodate this collection. The roof was raised, and the parapet also raised and altered from battlements to conceal the heightened roof. A two-storey porch was added to the front of the library at this time to give access to the gallery.

In 1937, the library came under the sole trusteeship of Durham University.

In 1998, a group of manuscripts was stolen from the library, including Bishop Cosin's copy of the Shakespeare First Folio. The folio was recovered in 2008 after it was taken to the Folger Shakespeare Library in Washington DC to be valued, though it had sustained damage from attempts to hide its provenance. It returned to display at the library in 2010.

In October 2005, the collections in the library were included in the first group given designated status by the Museums, Libraries and Archives Council as having an "outstanding national and international significance".

In 2019, the university received an £85,000 grant to catalogue and digitise the contents of the library.
