= Durham University Museum of Archaeology =

Archaeological museum at the University of Durham

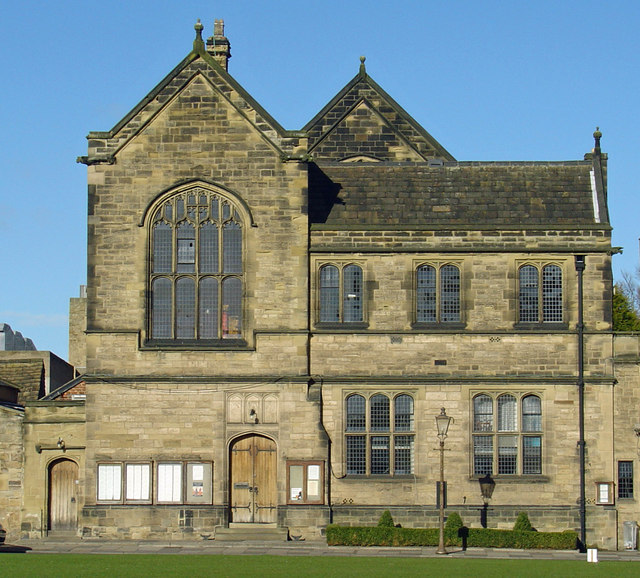

- Location within Durham, England
- Former name: Durham University Museum
- Established: 1833
- Location: Palace Green, Durham, England
- Coordinates: 54°46′28″N 1°34′35″W
- Type: University archaeology museum
- Accreditation: UK Museum Accreditation Scheme, Arts Council England
- Key holdings: Oswald-Plique collection, Lanchester diploma
- Collections: Prehistoric, Ancient Greek, Roman, early medieval, medieval, post-medieval
- Visitors: 30,000
- Curator: Gemma Lewis
- Owner: Durham University
- Website: www.dur.ac.uk/archaeology.museum/

The Museum of Archaeology, founded in 1833, is the archaeology museum of Durham University in England and was the second university museum in England to be open to the public. It is mostly focused on the archaeology of north east England with some national and international artefacts. The collections range from the prehistoric to the post-medieval, including the internationally important Oswald-Plique collection of Samian ware and the first complete Roman fleet diploma to be found in Britain. It is the repository for development-led archaeology finds in Durham City.

The Museum of Archaeology is part of Durham University Museums, Galleries and Exhibitions, along with Durham Castle Museum and Durham University Oriental Museum.

== History ==
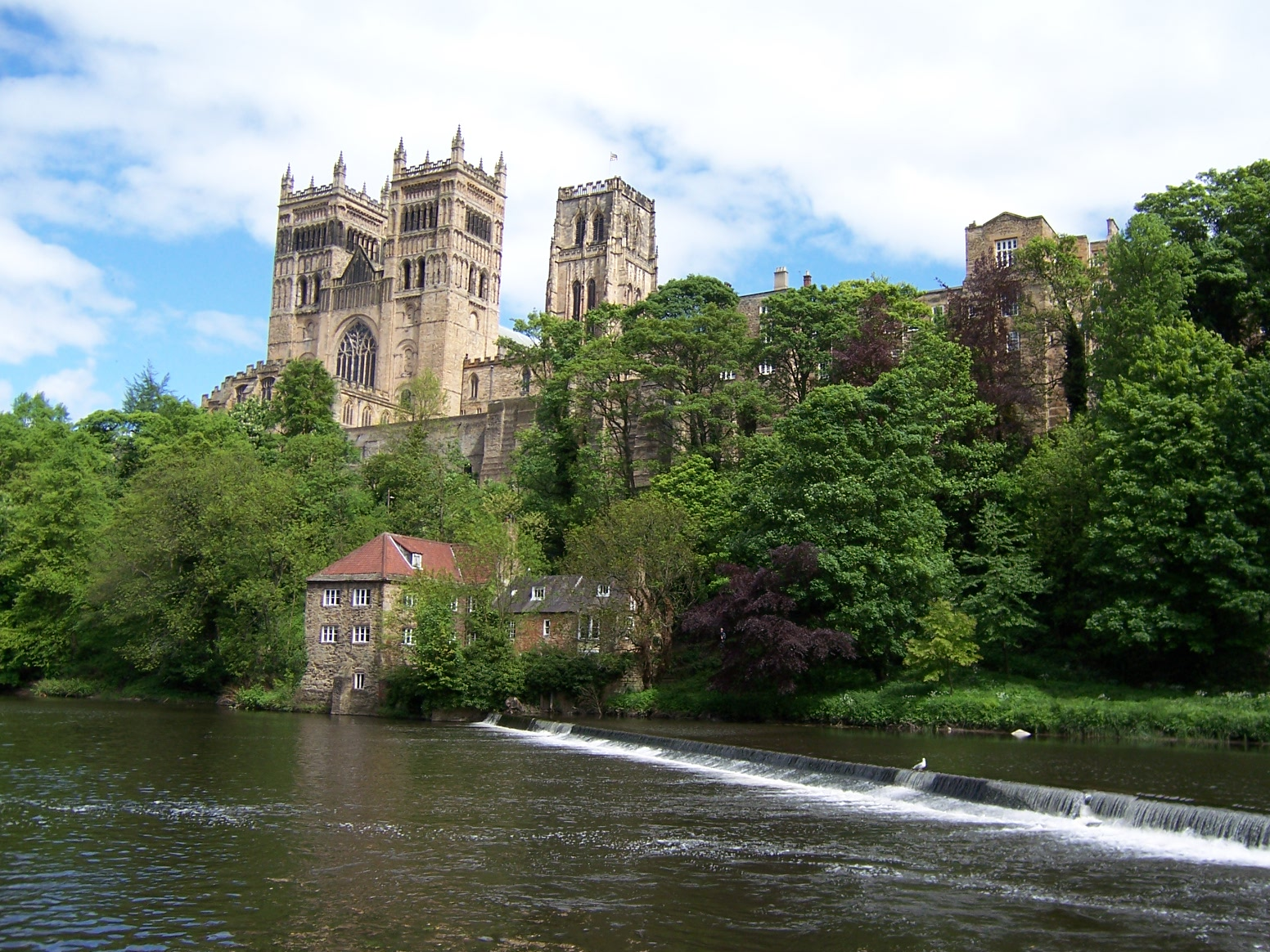
The Old Fulling Mill on the bank of the River Wear, home of the museum from 1833 to 1876 and 1975 to 2014

In 1833, the year the university opened, the Old Fulling Mill on the River Wear below Durham Cathedral became the university museum. It was the second university museum in England to be open to the public. (Note: The first was the Ashmolean Museum in Oxford in 1683; Cambridge's Fitzwilliam Museum would not open to the public until 1848) In 1876 it moved to Bishop Cosin's Almshouses on Palace Green. The early collection included a large number of natural history specimens, including "an almost complete collection of British birds", many donated by Thomas Gisborne, along with Roman artefacts from Binchester. In 1892, The Antiquary praised the Binchester collection as being "of first-class archaeological value" but concluded that overall "their museum reflects no credit on the University of Durham".

At the start of the first world war, Durham's lecturer theatres were commandeered and the museum was converted to a temporary lecture theatre. The building had never been satisfactory as a museum, so it was decided to rationalise the collection, disposing of some of the more eclectic items of little educational value and moving the others to where they would be most useful. The collection of British birds went to St Hild's College, other scientific specimens to the science laboratories, the Binchester collection was moved to a room used primarily for lectures in history, and other objects to the university library.

The university appointed Eric Birley as its first lecturer in archaeology in 1931, and he added material to the teaching collection from his excavations at Hadrian's Wall. In 1975, the museum was re-opened in the Old Fulling Mill, now concentrated purely on archaeology, with further galleries being opened in 1986. However, the location was prone to flooding and outside the main tourist areas. In 2014, the museum re-located back to Palace Green, to the Wolfson Gallery within the Durham University Library complex. Since 2021, the research collections have been stored off-site.

== Collections ==
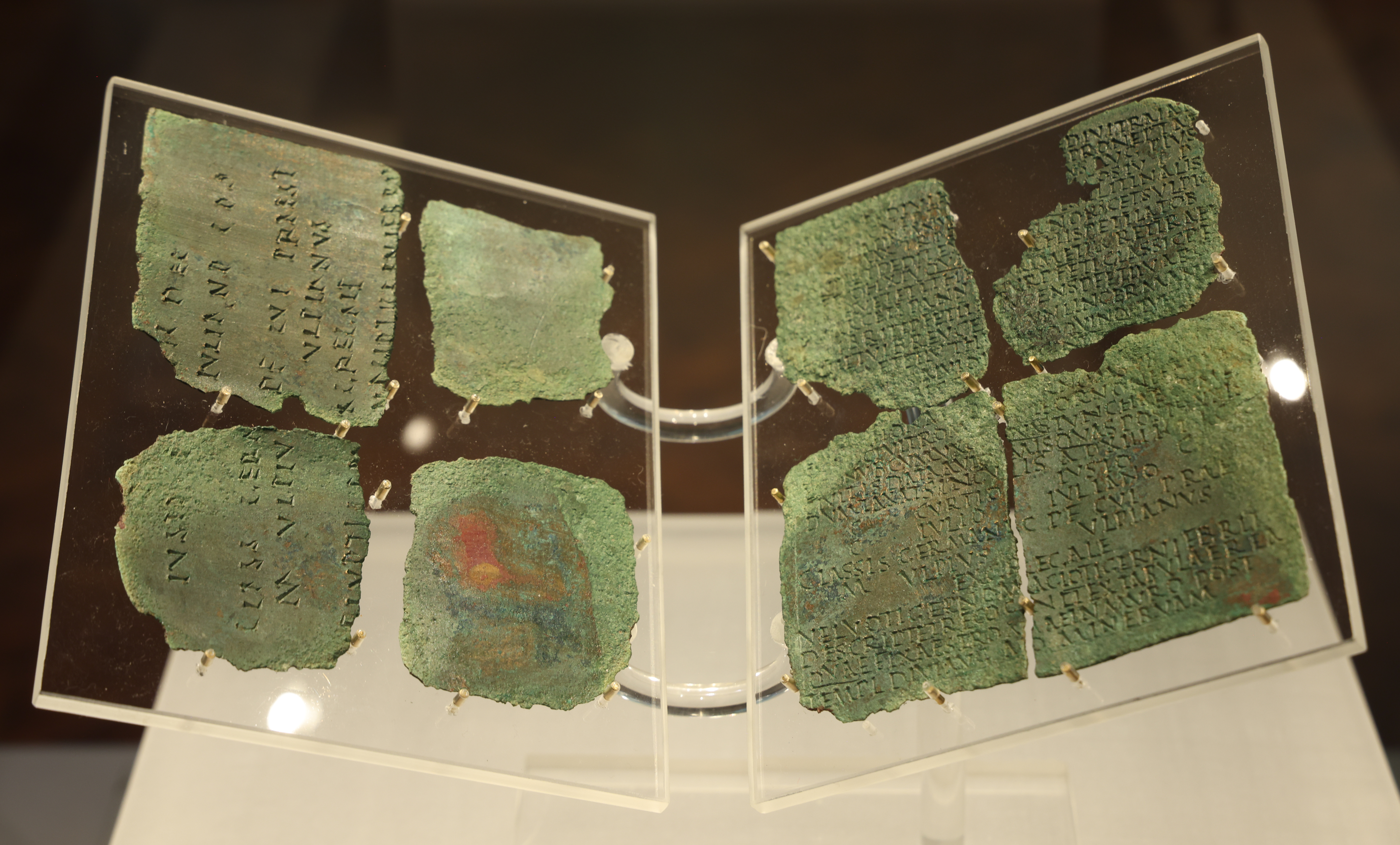
The Lanchester Diploma

The museum's collections cover the prehistoric, Ancient Greek, Roman, early medieval, medieval and post-medieval periods. Items of interest include the Bronze Age Houghall Sword, a Ewart Park sword from 700–900 BC found on the Houghall campus of East Durham College just south of Durham in 1996; the internationally important Oswald-Plique collection of over 4,500 pieces of Samian ware, acquired by Birley in 1950, which formed a reference for Oswald's 1936–7 Index of Figure Types on Terra Sigillata and Stanfield and Simpson's 1958 Central Gaulish Potters, both of which remain standard reference books; Roman artefacts from the Victorian excavations at Binchester and Birley's 1930s work at Benwell on Hadrian's Wall; and the Lanchester Diploma, the first complete Roman fleet diploma to be found in Britain, discovered in Lanchester, County Durham, by a detectorist in 2016, and naming Veluotigernos as one of the earliest known British sailors.

The bulk of the collection is from development-led archaeology, with the museum being the repository for archaeology carried out in advance of construction in Durham City and the surrounding parishes. These include bone fragments of Durhams earliest known resident, carbon dated to between 90BC and 60AD, that were found at 18-29 Claypath in 2016–17 prior to the construction of student residences on the site; as well as one of the UK's largest collections of post-medieval glass, with over 100 bottles from the 17th and 18th centuries recovered from earlier excavations on Claypath in the 1990s.

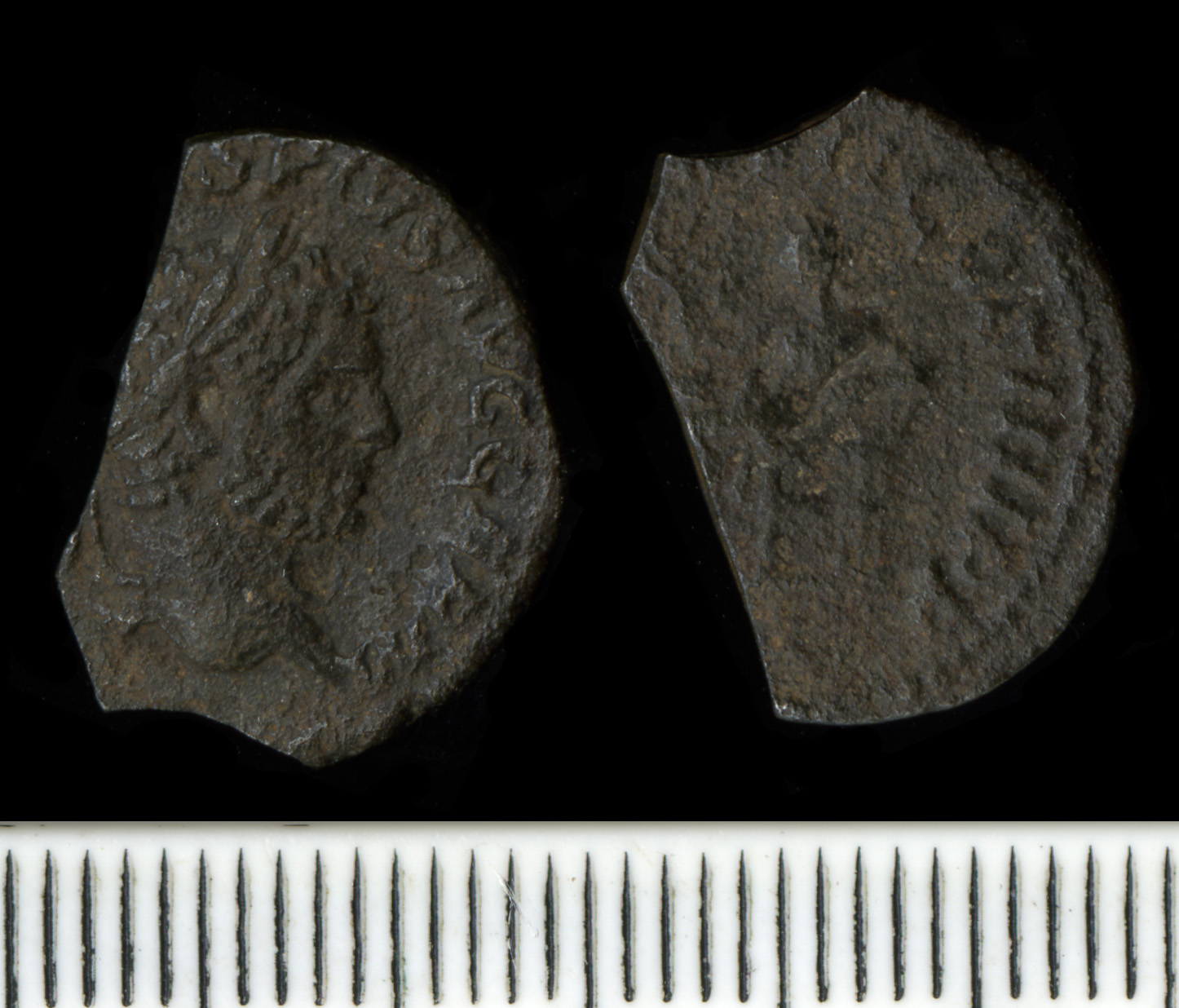
Silver denarius of Emperor Caracalla from the Piercebridge assemblage, deliberately cut in three directions

The collection also includes the Piercebridge River Assemblage, over 4,000 Roman artefacts recovered from where Dere Street crossed the River Tees, thought to be mostly votive offerings thrown from the bridges; and the Durham River Wear Assemblage, over 13,500 objects recovered from the River Wear below the 12th-century Elvet Bridge, which was the subject of a special exhibition in 2023; as well as archives and finds from the Durham City Survey.
