= Durham University Oriental Museum =

Museum in England

Oriental Museum
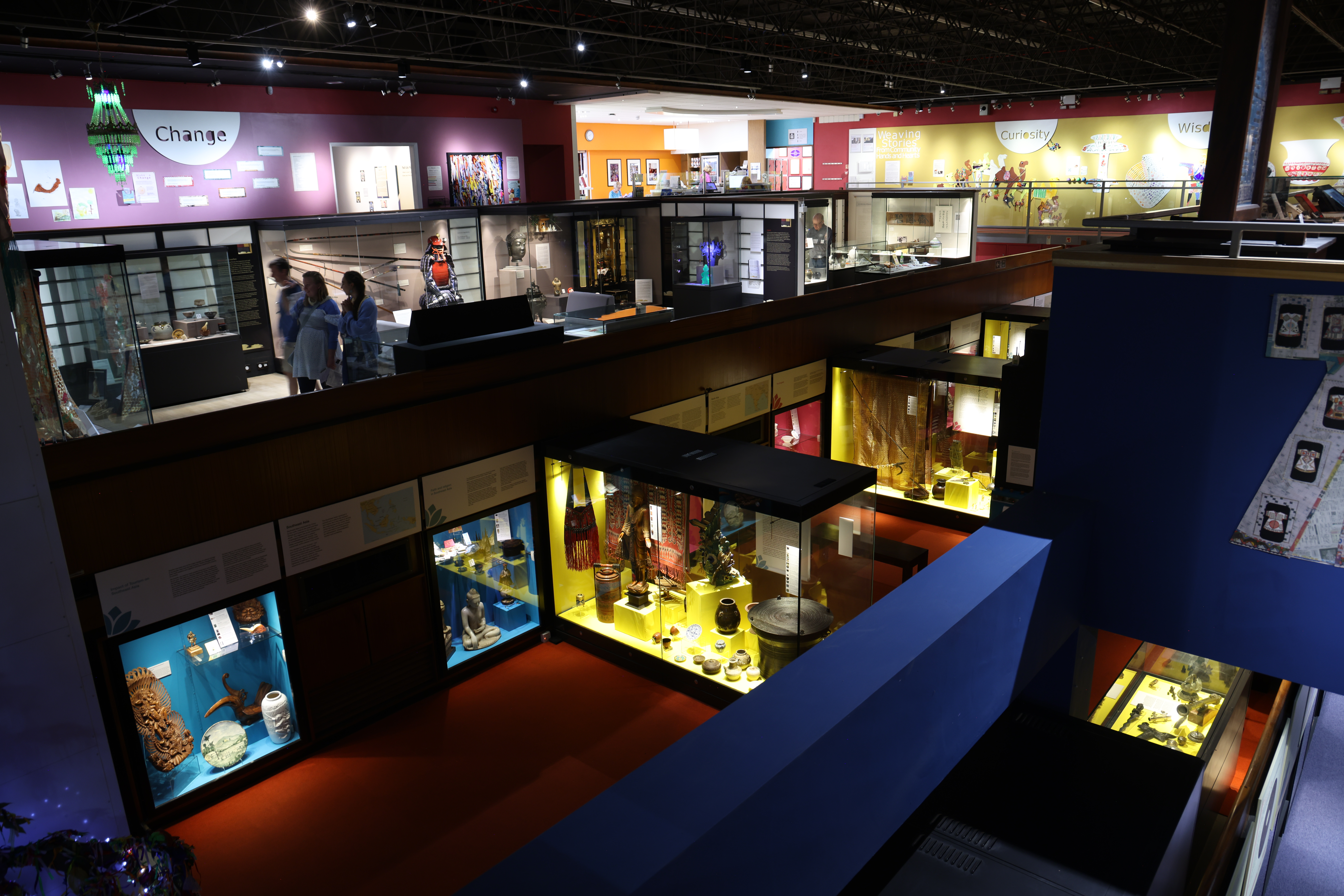
- The main gallery area

- Location in Durham
- Established: 1960
- Location: Durham, County Durham, United Kingdom
- Coordinates: 54.764°N 1.5815°W
- Visitors: 19,263 (2009/10)
- Curator: Rachel Barclay
- Website: http://www.dur.ac.uk/oriental.museum/

The Oriental Museum, formerly the Gulbenkian Museum of Oriental Art and Archaeology, is a museum of the University of Durham in England. The museum has a collection of more than 23,500 Chinese, Egyptian, Korean, Indian, Japanese and other Far East and Asian artefacts. The museum was founded due to the need to house an increasing collection of Oriental artefacts used by the School of Oriental Studies, that were previously housed around the university. The museum's Chinese, Egyptian and Japanese collections have been 'designated' by the Arts Council England) as being of "national and international importance".

== History ==
Founded in 1960 to support the university's teaching and research in the School of Oriental Studies, the collections of the museum have largely grown through donations and purchases to support cultural studies alongside the teaching of languages, particularly following the appointment of William Thacker as Professor of Hebrew and Oriental Languages in 1941 and the establishment of the School of Oriental Studies in 1951. The museum had its beginnings in Thacker's acquisition in 1949 of the Northumberland Collection of items from Egypt and the Near East. The collection was initially housed in two rooms (one for display, one for storage) in Hatfield College, with viewing by appointment only. After this was forced to close in 1956, the collection was placed in storage.

In 1953, as part of the celebrations of the Coronation of Elizabeth II, Raymond Dawson, lecturer in Chinese, curated an exhibition of loaned Chinese bronzes. In 1954, Cosin's Library hosted an exhibition of Chinese books and textiles. These led to major donations to the university of the Chinese ceramics collection of Malcolm MacDonald and the jades and hardstones collections of Charles Hardinge in the late 1950s.

The growth of the school led to it moving to Elvet Hill House, the current location of the museum, on the south edge of Durham. With part of the collection still held at various sites and the success of the initial exhibitions, potential donors were sought for the formal establishment of a museum. A successful bid was made to the Gulbenkian Foundation in 1957 with a £60,000 donation to fund the initial stage of the museum, which was named the "Gulbenkian Museum of Oriental Art and Archaeology". The museum was completed in 1959 with the collections being transferred to the new museum by the end of the year. After the creation of the displays, the museum was officially opened in May 1960 with a three-day week initially attracting c.100 visitors a week.

In October 1969 a fragment of Moon rock was sent to the university's department of earth sciences. Prior to undergoing analysis the rock was displayed at the museum for two days attracting over 12,000 people resulting in the museum opening until 8:30pm to accommodate the visitors.

In the 1980s the name was shortened to the "Oriental Museum" and there were plans for a major rebuilding and refurbishment, which was not carried out.

In 2008, the Ancient Egyptian and Chinese collections were granted designated status as collections of national and international importance by the Museums, Libraries and Archives Council.

In 2012, thieves stole Chinese artefacts worth almost £2 million. The items were recovered by police and returned to the museum. In 2013, two men were found guilty of the theft and jailed.

In 2013, the museum received funding from the Arts Council for the redevelopment of the South Asian and Himalayan collections, including creation of a new gallery, as part of a four-year refurbishment of all of the galleries. In 2000 funding was secured from the National Lottery to create a mezzanine floor to display additional artifacts from the collections.

A new Egyptian gallery, named the Thacker gallery after the school of oriental studies' first director, was opened in 2016 following a refurbishment of the museum. It included an Egyptian mummy known as "The Lady", who was buried with the oldest-known prosthetic limb, made of linen and plaster. Based on the style of her coffin she is thought to have died during the Ptolemaic Period although there is disagreement as to when within that period. Formally catalogued as DUROM 1999.32 the mummified woman was previously in the collection of the Darlington Museum before being loaned to the Oriental Museum in 1960 and permanently transferred in 1999. Prior being transferred to the Darlington Museum in 1930 the mummified woman had been in the collection of Penrith public library to whom she was donated by Miss F.M. Wilson who had purchased her in 1888. While described as female by the museum signage the sex of the mummy is unclear. Studies of scans have suggested that the mummy is slightly more likely to be female while the coffin is of a type more commonly associated with men although not unknown for women. Additionally a six-inch figurine of a serving girl carrying a jar from 1360 BC, part of a short period when Egyptian artists made life-like pieces.

In 2016, the museum began a partnership with China's Palace Museum. In 2025, it became the only institution outside of China to host the "Journey of a Century: From the Forbidden City to the Palace Museum" photographic exhibition celebrating 100 years of the Palace Museum.

In 2017, the museum staged the first exhibition held in Britain on the Chinese Labour Corps volunteers who assisted the British Army in World War I.

In 2021, the museum returned two Japanese Good Luck Flags that were taken as souvenirs in World War II to the families of their owners. One flag had been part of the university's collection for many years but was only identified in 2018, while the other was temporarily held by the museum at the request of the police while the work to return it was carried out.

The museum held an exhibition in 2024 on the 1924 British Mount Everest expedition, featuring an internationally important collection of photographs taken by Bentley Beetham, one of the survivors of the exhibition.

In 2025, the museum returned an 18th-century Māori war cloak (pauku) with a rare Tāniko border to New Zealand on a five-year loan to the Auckland War Memorial Museum. The cloak, one of only five known to exist, was loaned to the Durham museum in the 1960s before being gifted in 1971, and is the first to return to New Zealand. Rangi Te Kanawa and other Māori experts worked from 2017 with staff from the museum and Durham's archaeology department to research and conserve the cloak. Further research will be carried out during the loan to find out more about the origins of the cloak and to determine the most appropriate permanent location.

== Collections ==
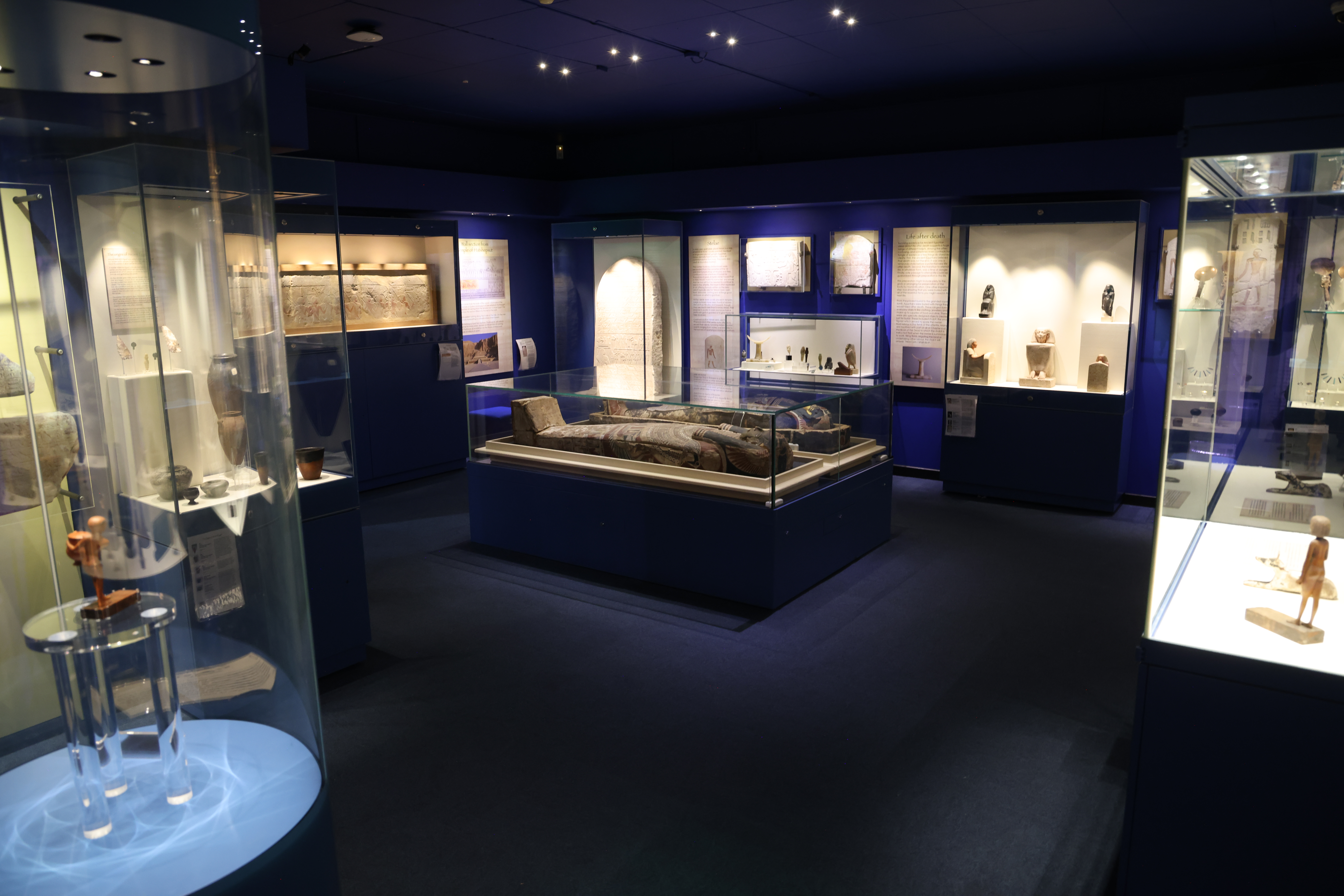
The Thacker Gallery

- China: The Chinese collection contains over 10,000 objects ranging from the Zhou dynasty to the Qing dynasty included c.1,000 pieces of Chinese pottery, of which 400 are from the Malcolm MacDonald collection, and nearly 2,000 pieces of Jade and hardstones from the Sir Charles Hardinge donation.
- Korea: Containing just over 500 pieces, the collection is one of the smallest with objects from the Goryeo dynasty and Joseon dynasty including bronze mirrors and ceramics with sanggam decoration. The collection is predominantly composed of the donations from Richard Rutt and Henry de Laszlo. Recent acquisitions of contemporary Korean culture and art have been made possible by the Stories of the World project and the Art Fund, resulting in the Korean collection encompassing the time period from 600 AD to 2013.
- Indian subcontinent: Ranging from stone sculptures to Mughal jade and Gandharan sculptures the collections contains 1,500 objects, and over 5,000 photographs taken by John Marshall.
- Japan: The Japanese collection spans mostly the Edo and Meiji periods of Japanese history but also contains objects from the Muromachi and Momoyama periods, along with a bronze Buddha head from the Kamakura era.
- South East Asia: The collection is formed mainly from two acquisitions, the Harold MacDonald collection consisting of items presented to him as Commissioner General of South East Asia, and the Roberts Collection of Balinese art.
- The Levant and Middle East: The collection contains many artefacts collected from archaeological excavations such as those from Sir Leonard Woolley's excavations at Ur, Kathleen Kenyon's at Jericho and the Lachish excavation. The core of the collection is from the Northumberland Collections consisting of seals and cuneiform tablets.
- Ancient Egypt: Made up of over 6,700 objects the Egyptian collection is formed from two main acquisitions; The Northumberland collection of over 2,500, purchased from the Fourth Duke of Northumberland, and 4,600 items comprising the Sir Henry Wellcome collections. The collection includes an 18th dynasty funeral mask, and Shabti of Prince Bahmery along with a statue of the Vizier Paser from the 19th dynasty, reign of Ramesses II.

== Operations ==
The museum is part of "Museums, Galleries and Exhibitions" with the Durham University Library and Collections department of the university.

== Use and recognition ==
Two of the collections, the Chinese collection and the Ancient Egyptian collection, are designated under the Arts Council England's Designation Scheme. The museum is also accredited as part of the Arts Council England's UK Museum Accreditation Scheme. It receives national funding from Research England's higher education museums and galleries fund.

In March 2012, the museum received a bronze-level "Hear by Right" award from the National Youth Agency.
