= National museums of the United Kingdom =

There are a number of national museums in the United Kingdom, which are owned and operated by the state. The national museums of the UK are funded by the Department for Culture, Media and Sport (DCMS) of the British government, and are all located in England. There are 14 national museums, all established by Acts of Parliament, as well as another eight which are sponsored by the DCMS.

In addition, there are national museums in Scotland, Wales and Northern Ireland, which are supported by the devolved legislatures. National museums in Scotland are funded by the Scottish Executive Education Department, in Wales by the Welsh Government, and in Northern Ireland by the Department of Culture, Arts and Leisure of the Northern Ireland Executive.

Free entrance is standard practice in all UK national museums, although some exhibits do require an admission fee to view. Several of the museums have more than one location throughout the UK.

== National museums in England ==
=== National museums established by Act of Parliament ===
- British Museum, London
- Imperial War Museums, London, Cambridge and Manchester
  - Imperial War Museum London
  - Imperial War Museum Duxford
  - HMS Belfast 1938, London
  - Churchill War Rooms, London
  - Imperial War Museum North, Trafford
- National Gallery, London
- National Maritime Museum, London
- National Museum of the Royal Navy, Portsmouth, Gosport, Yeovilton, Belfast, and Hartlepool
  - National Museum of the Royal Navy, Portsmouth
  - Fleet Air Arm Museum, Yeovilton
  - HMS Caroline, Belfast
  - National Museum of the Royal Navy, Hartlepool
  - Explosion Museum of Naval Firepower, Gosport
  - Royal Navy Submarine Museum, Gosport
- National Museums Liverpool
  - World Museum, Liverpool
  - Walker Art Gallery, Liverpool
  - Merseyside Maritime Museum, Liverpool
  - Seized! The Border and Customs uncovered, Liverpool
  - International Slavery Museum, Liverpool
  - Lady Lever Art Gallery, Port Sunlight
  - Sudley House, Liverpool
  - Museum of Liverpool, Liverpool
- Science Museum Group
  - Science Museum, London
  - Science and Industry Museum, Manchester
  - National Railway Museum, York
  - National Science and Media Museum, Bradford
  - National Collections Centre, Swindon
  - Locomotion, Shildon
- National Portrait Gallery, London
- National Army Museum, Chelsea, London
- Natural History Museum, London
- Royal Armouries
  - Royal Armouries, Tower of London
  - Royal Armouries Museum, Leeds
  - Fort Nelson, Hampshire
- Royal Air Force Museum
  - Royal Air Force Museum London
  - Royal Air Force Museum Midlands, Cosford
- Sir John Soane's Museum, London
- Tate
  - Tate Britain, London
  - Tate Liverpool
  - Tate St Ives
  - Tate Modern, London
- Victoria and Albert Museum, London
- Wallace Collection, London

=== Sponsored museums ===
- Horniman Museum and Gardens, London
- Museum of the Home, London
- National Coal Mining Museum for England, Overton, West Yorkshire

== National museums in Northern Ireland ==
- Ulster Museum
- Ulster Folk Museum
- Ulster American Folk Park
- Ulster Transport Museum

== See also ==
- List of museums in England
- List of museums in Scotland
- List of museums in Wales
- List of museums in Northern Ireland
