= Durham Museum, Durham =

Museum in Durham, England

Coordinates: 54.7736°N 1.5745°W

Durham Museum was located in the redundant Church of St Mary-le-Bow

Durham Museum (previously Durham Museum and Heritage Centre) was a museum in Durham, England. It detailed the history of the City of Durham from medieval times to the present day. The museum was located in the redundant church of St Mary-le-Bow, close to the World Heritage Site of Durham Cathedral and Durham Castle, which is bounded on the north and east by Hatfield College; on the south by Bow Lane, and the west by North Bailey. The costs of maintaining the building forced the museum's closure in 2024. The museum was mainly run by volunteers.

The museum contained a variety of objects, models, pictures and audio-visual displays. These exhibitions provided the visitor with an overview of life, labour and leisure in this ancient fortified city, centre of pilgrimage and capital of the Prince Bishops of Durham.

Many of the museum's displays involved the industry and trade that Durham is known for, including the manufacture of organs, which still continues. As well as these permanent displays, there were also periodic exhibitions and events that highlighted the lesser known aspects of Durham's social history. The museum also featured a centre for making brass rubbings as well as a souvenir shop.

== History ==
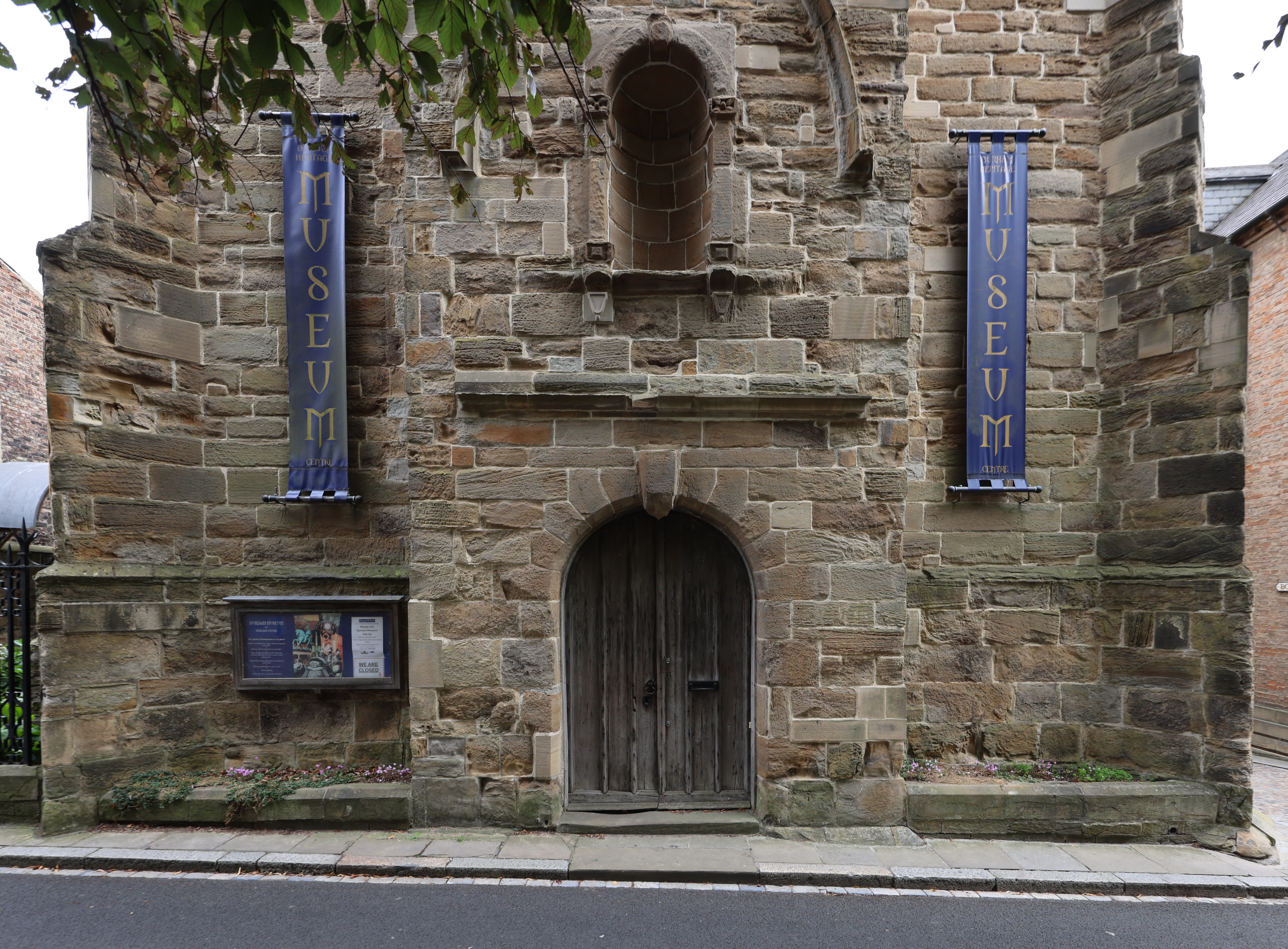
The front of the former museum

The church was rebuilt in the 1670s to replace a church on the same site which collapsed in 1632, incorporating earlier material. The church is a reconstruction of an older building, so it contains elements from different dates. The roof is fifteenth-century and the panelling is eighteenth-century. During the Middle Ages, an arch connected the tower to the fortifications, which created a 'bow'. However, this later collapsed in 1635. The building lay in ruins until 1685, although efforts were made to preserve the building by the parishioners. The rebuilding only began thanks to the help from the Bishop of Durham, as well as the Dean and Chapter of Durham Cathedral. The present tower dates from 1702, and now contains a bell cast by Dalton of York in 1759. The church boasts intricate wood carvings. The altar rails and wood screen are very historic, dating from 1705 and 1707 respectively. In 1731, the wainscoting was installed. Ten years later, in 1741, the west gallery and vestry were built. However, after a closure in 1968, many of the fittings were removed. Although much of the building has origins from medieval times, much of the present building is from the seventeenth century.

The church closed in 1968 and the museum opened in 1972, running until 2024.

== The Bow Trust ==
Established in 1975, the Bow Trust (Durham) Limited is a registered charity (number 513865). The charity was created to maintain the now redundant church of St Mary-Le-Bow, with the goal of turning it into a centre for upholding the history and culture of both the city and county Durham. This culminated in the establishment of Durham Museum which the trust ran in the old church building.

== Sculptures by Fenwick Lawson ==
Fenwick Lawson is a local sculptor who has contributed three works of art to Durham Museum, the first being 'Cuthbert of Farne' which he sculpted in 1984 and donated to the museum in 2004. (A bronze cast of this is on display at Lindisfarne abbey.) Gaia (1984), named after the goddess, was presented to the museum in 2011. His latest donation to the museum depicts the biblical story of Jacob wrestling with an angel.
