= Creighton Lecture =

Annual history lecture at King's College, London

The Creighton Lecture is an annual lecture delivered at King's College, London on a topic in history. The series, which memorializes historian and prelate Mandell Creighton, began in 1907 with a grant of £650, half of which was donated by his widow, Louise Creighton.

== List of Creighton Lectures ==
=== 1907-49 ===
- 1907 Thomas Hodgkin, The Wardens of the Northern Marches (published 1908)
- 1908 G. W. Prothero, ‘The arrival of Napoleon III’ [unpublished]
- 1909 J. B. Bury, The Constitution of the Later Roman Empire (published 1910)
- 1910 F. J. Haverfield, ‘Greek and Roman town-planning’; expanded into his Ancient Town-Planning (1913)
- 1911 H. A. L. Fisher, Political Unions (published 1911)
- 1912 Paul Vinogradoff, ‘Constitutional history and the year books’, Law Quarterly Review, xxix (1913), 273–84
- 1913 R. B. Haldane, The Meaning of Truth in History (published 1914)
- 1914 James Bryce, Race Sentiment as a Factor in History (published 1915)
- 1915 J. W. Fortescue, ‘England at war in three centuries’ [unpublished?]
- 1916 A. F. Pollard, ‘The growth of an imperial parliament’, History, i (1916–17), 129–46
- 1917 C. H. Firth, Then and Now, or a Comparison between the War with Napoleon and the Present War (published 1917)
- 1918 Gilbert Murray, Aristophanes and the War Party: a Study in the Contemporary Criticism of the Peloponnesian War (published 1919)
- 1919 G. M. Trevelyan, The War and the European Revolution in Relation to History (published 1920)
- 1920 T. F. Tout, ‘England and France in the 14th century and now’; expanded into his France and England: their Relations in the Middle Ages and Now (1922)
- 1921 Julian Corbett, ‘Napoleon and the British Navy after Trafalgar’, Quarterly Review, ccxxxvii (1922), 238–55
- 1922 Charles Oman, ‘Historical perspective’; cf. his On the Writing of History (1939), pp. 76ff.
- 1923 G. P. Gooch, Franco-German Relations, 1867–1914 (published 1923)
- 1924 W. S. Holdsworth, The Influence of the Legal Profession on the Growth of the English Constitution (published 1924)
- 1925 Graham Wallas, ‘Bentham as political inventor’, Contemporary Review, cxxix (1926), 308–19
- 1926 C. W. Alvord, ‘The significance of the new interpretation of Georgian politics’ [unpublished?]
- 1927 C. Grant Robertson, History and Citizenship (published 1928)
- 1928 R. W. Seton-Watson, ‘A plea for the study of contemporary history’, History, xiv (1929–30), 1–18
- 1929 ‘E. Barber’ [?= Ernest Barker], ‘Political ideas in Boston during the American Revolution’ [unpublished?]
- 1930 Henri Pirenne, ‘La révolution belge de 1830’ [unpublished]
- 1931 Edward Jenks, ‘History and the historical novel’, The Hibbert Journal, Jan. 1932
- 1932 F. M. Powicke, ‘Pope Boniface VIII’, History, xviii (1933–4), 307–29
- 1933 N. H. Baynes, ‘The Byzantine imperial ideal’ [unpublished?]
- 1934 A. P. Newton, ‘The West Indies in international politics, 1550–1850’, History, xix (1934–5), 193–207, 302–10
- 1935 F. M. Stenton, ‘The road system of medieval England’, Economic History Review, vii (1936–7), 1–21
- 1936 Charles Peers, ‘History in the making’, History, xxi (1936–7), 302–16
- 1937 R. H. Tawney, ‘The economic advance of the squirearchy in the two generations before the civil war’; cf. his ‘Rise of the gentry, 1558–1640’, Economic History Review, xi (1941), 1–38
- 1938 J. H. Clapham, ‘Charles Louis, Elector Palatine, 1617–80: an early experiment in liberalism’, Economica, new ser., vii (1940), 381–96
- 1939–45 No lectures
- 1946 C. K. Webster, ‘The making of the charter of the United Nations’, History, xxxii (1947), 16–38
- 1947 A. Toynbee, ‘The unification of the world and the change in historical perspective’, History, xxxiii (1948), 1–28
- 1948 G. N. Clark, The Cycle of War and Peace in Modern History (published 1949)
- 1949 V. H. Galbraith, Historical Research in Medieval England (published 1951)

=== 1950-99 ===
- 1950 J. E. Neale, The Elizabethan Age (published 1951)
- 1951 E. F. Jacob, Henry Chichele and the Ecclesiastical Politics of his Age (published 1952)
- 1952 Lewis Namier, Basic Factors in 19th-Century European History (published 1953)
- 1953 T. F. T. Plucknett, The Mediaeval Bailiff (published 1954)
- 1954 H. Hale Bellot, Woodrow Wilson (published 1955)
- 1955 Keith Hancock, The Smuts Papers (published 1956)
- 1956 M. D. Knowles, Cardinal Gasquet as an Historian (published 1957)
- 1957 J. G. Edwards, The Commons in Medieval English Parliaments (published 1958)
- 1958 Lucy S. Sutherland, The City of London and the Opposition to Government, 1768–74: a Study in the Rise of Metropolitan Radicalism (published 1959)
- 1959 Steven Runciman, The Families of Outremer: the Feudal Nobility of the Crusader Kingdom of Jerusalem, 1099–1291 (published 1960)
- 1960 Lillian Penson, Foreign Affairs under the Third Marquis of Salisbury (published 1962)
- 1961 Herbert Butterfield, Charles James Fox and Napoleon: the Peace Negotiations of 1806 (published 1962)
- 1962 R. R. Darlington, The Norman Conquest (published 1963)
- 1963 Ronald Syme, ‘Caesar: drama, legend, personality’ [unpublished?]
- 1964 R. A. Humphreys, Tradition and Revolt in Latin America (published 1965)
- 1965 Michael Roberts, On Aristocratic Constitutionalism in Swedish History, 1520–1720 (published 1966)
- 1966 R. W. Southern, ‘England and the continent in the twelfth century’; cf. his Medieval Humanism and Other Studies (1970), pp. 135–57
- 1967 A. H. M. Jones, ‘The caste system in the later Roman empire’ [unpublished?]
- 1968 W. N. Medlicott, Britain and Germany: the Search for Agreement, 1930–7 (published 1969)
- 1969 E. H. Gombrich, Myth and Reality in German War-time Broadcasts (published 1970)
- 1970 Philip Grierson, The Origins of Money (published 1977)
- 1971 Isaiah Berlin, ‘Georges Sorel [Harbinger of the Storm]’, in Essays in Honour of E. H. Carr, ed. C. Abramsky (1974), pp. 3–35
- 1972 C. H. Philips, The Young Wellington in India (published 1973)
- 1973 A. J. P. Taylor, The Second World War (published 1974)
- 1974 F. J. Fisher, ‘Labour in the economy of Stuart England’ [unpublished]
- 1975 Owen Chadwick, Acton and Gladstone (published 1976)
- 1976 A. Blunt, ‘Illusionism in Baroque architecture’ [unpublished?]
- 1977 M. M. Postan, ‘The English rural labourer in the later middle ages’ [unpublished]
- 1978 Joel Hurstfield, The Illusion of Power in Tudor Politics (published 1979)
- 1979 Joseph Needham, The Guns of Kaifêng-fu: China's Development of Man's First Chemical Explosive (published 1979)
- 1980 A. Momigliano, ‘The origins of universal history’, Annali della Scuola Normale Superiore di Pisa, ser. 3, xii (1982), 533–60
- 1981 Michael Howard, The Causes of Wars (published 1981)
- 1982 Ragnhild M. Hatton, The Anglo-Hanoverian Connection, 1714–60 (published 1983)
- 1983 Keith Thomas, The Perception of the Past in Early Modern England (published 1983)
- 1984 William G. Beasley, The Nature of Japanese Imperialism (published 1985)
- 1985 M. H. Keen, Some Late Medieval Views on Nobility (published 1985)
- 1986 J. H. Burns, Absolutism: the History of an Idea (published 1986)
- 1987 E. H. Kossmann, 1787: the Collapse of the Patriot Movement and the Problem of Dutch Decline (published 1988)
- 1988 H. R. Loyn, The ‘Matter of Britain’: a Historian's Perspective (published 1989)
- 1989 D. C. Coleman, Myth, History and the Industrial Revolution (published 1989)
- 1990 Douglas Johnson, ‘Occupation and collaboration: the conscience of France’ [unpublished?]
- 1991 J. H. Elliott, Illusion and Disillusionment: Spain and the Indies (published 1992)
- 1992 Ian Nish, The Uncertainties of Isolation: Japan between the Wars (published 1993)
- 1993 E. J. Hobsbawm, The Present as History: Writing the History of One's Own Times (published 1993)
- 1994 P. J. Marshall, Imperial Britain (published 1994)
- 1995 James Campbell, ‘European economic development in the eleventh century: an English case-study’ [unpublished?]
- 1996 Averil Cameron, ‘Byzantium: why do we need it?’ [unpublished?]
- 1997 E. Le Roy Ladurie, ‘The History of the book in France, 1460–1970’ [unpublished?]
- 1998 Peter Clarke, ‘The rise and fall of Thatcherism’, Historical Research, lxxii (1999), 301–22
- 1999 John Gillingham, ‘Civilizing the English? The English histories of William of Malmesbury and David Hume’, Historical Research, lxxiv (2001), 17–43

=== 2000-present ===
- 2000 Jessica Rawson, ‘The power of images: the model universe of the First Emperor and its legacy’, Historical Research, lxxv (2002), 123–54
- 2001 Shula Marks, ‘Class, culture and consciousness: the experience of Black South Africans, c.1870–1920’ [unpublished?]
- 2002 Patrick Collinson, ‘Elizabeth I and the verdicts of history’, Historical Research, lxxvi (2003), 469–91
- 2003 J. G. A. Pocock, ‘The politics of historiography’, Historical Research, lxxviii (2005), 1–14
- 2004 R. I. Moore, ‘The war against heresy in medieval Europe’, Historical Research, lxxxi (2008), 189–210
- 2005 R. F. Foster, ‘Changed Utterly’? Transformation and continuity in late 20th-century Ireland’, Historical Research, lxxx (2007), 419–41
- 2006 Olwen Hufton, ‘Faith, hope and money: the Jesuits and the genesis of educational fundraising, 1550–1650’ (Historical Research, lxxxi (2008), 585–609)
- 2007 R. J. W. Evans, 'The Creighton century: British historians and Europe, 1907–2007'|(Historical Research, lxxxii (2009), 320–329)
- 2008 Chris Wickham, 'Medieval Assembly : The culture of the public: Assembly politics and the feudal revolution.
- 2009 Robert Service, 'Russia since 1917 in Western mirrors'.
- 2010 Tim Blanning, 'The Holy Roman Empire of the German Nation past and present'.
- 2011 Catherine Hall, 'Macaulay and Son: an imperial story'.
- 2012 Quentin Skinner, 'John Milton as a theorist of liberty'.
- 2013 Lisa Jardine, 'Meeting my own history coming back : Jacob Bronowski's MI5 files'.
- 2014 Richard J. Evans, 'Was the 'Final Solution' Unique? Reflections on Twentieth-Century Genocides'.
- 2015 Margaret MacMillan, 'The Outbreak of the First World War: Why the debate goes on'.
- 2016 John Darwin, 'The Globe, the Sea and the City: Port Cities and Globalisation in the long 19th Century'
- 2017 Miri Rubin, 'Strangers in Medieval Cities'
- 2018 Richard Vinen, 'When was Thatcherism?'
- 2019 ?
- 2020 ?
- 2021 ?
- 2022 ?
- 2023: J. Willgoose, Esq 'The Power of Archives'
- 2024: Clive Myrie, "A Conversation on History with Clive Myrie"

== See also ==
- Dixie Professor of Ecclesiastical History
- Merton College, Oxford
- Bishop of London
