= James Campbell (historian) =

British historian (1935–2016)

James Campbell FBA FSA
- Born: Cheltenham, Gloucestershire
- Died: Witney, Oxfordshire
- Spouse: Bӓrbel Brodt (m. 2006; died 2015)

Academic background
- Education: Lowestoft Grammar School
- Alma mater: Magdalen College, Oxford
- Doctoral advisor: Vivian Hunter Galbraith; May McKisack
- Other advisors: Karl Leyser; K.B. McFarlane

Academic work
- Discipline: Historian
- Sub-discipline: Medieval period; Anglo-Saxons; Bede; History of England
- Institutions: Merton College, Oxford; Worcester College, Oxford; Faculty of History, University of Oxford

James Campbell (26 January 1935 – 31 May 2016) was a British historian, specialising in the medieval period and the Anglo-Saxons. He was a Fellow of Worcester College, Oxford, from 1957 until his retirement in 2002, and Professor of Medieval History at the University of Oxford from 1996 to 2002.

== Early life and education ==
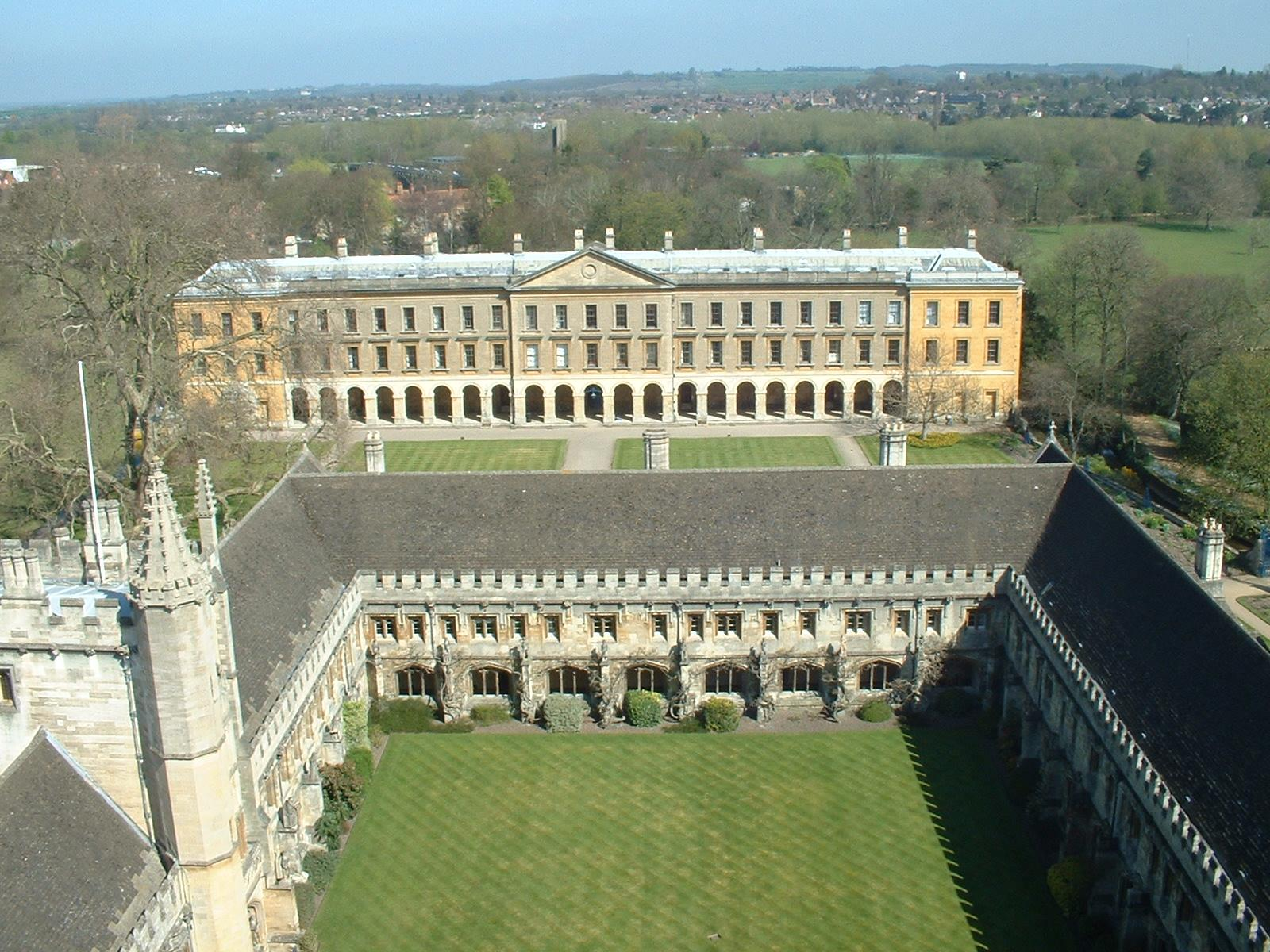
Magdalen College, Oxford

Campbell was born on 26 January 1935 in Cheltenham, Gloucestershire, England. His birth father, John Henry Mogg was a teacher and his mother Barbara Hilda Brown was also a teacher and member of the Communist Party. After a period in foster care he was adopted by his maternal grandparents in 1938. He studied at Lowestoft Grammar School, where he found an interest in history. He took early entry to Magdalen College, Oxford, at the age of 17 and graduated with a first in 1955, sharing the History Faculty's Gibbs Prize with Keith Thomas in 1954. He studied under Vivian Hunter Galbraith and May McKisack, and was influenced by Karl Leyser and K.B. McFarlane.

== Academic career ==
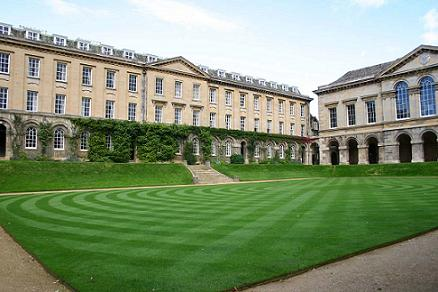
Worcester College, Oxford Quadrangle

In 1956, Campbell took up a junior research fellowship at Merton College, Oxford. In 1957, at the age of 22, he was elected a Fellow at Worcester College, Oxford. He held additional college appointments, including Fellow Librarian (1977–2002) and senior tutor (1989–1993), and also served as the University of Oxford's Senior Proctor for the 1973/74 academic year. At university level teaching, he was a lecturer in modern history (as opposed to ancient history) from 1958 to 1990, Reader in Medieval History from 1990 to 1996, and Professor of Medieval History from 1996 to 2002. He was also Visiting Professor at the University of South Carolina in 1969 and at the University of Rochester in 1986–87.

He was invited to give the Jarrow Lecture on "Bede's Reges and Principes" at St Paul's Church, Jarrow, in 1979. He delivered the Raleigh Lecture on History on "The Late Anglo-Saxon State: A Maximum View" at the British Academy in 1991, the Creighton Lecture on "European economic development in the eleventh century: an English case-study" at King's College, London in 1995 and the Ford Lectures on "The Origins of the English State" in the 1995/96 academic year. He remained at Worcester College until his retirement in 2002. In 2006, he was made an Honorary Doctor of Letters (DLitt) by the University of East Anglia.

Campbell's particular historical interest was in the medieval period and Anglo-Saxon studies. Along with Sonia Chadwick Hawkes and David Brown, in 1979 he founded the series Anglo-Saxon Studies in Archaeology and History. He was also interested in agriculture in Britain and Ireland from the 13th to 19th centuries. Two collections of his essays were published as Essays in Anglo-Saxon History in 1986 and The Anglo-Saxon State in 2000. He was the editor of The Anglo-Saxons (1982), a collection of essays on Anglo-Saxon England, for which he wrote the section on the period from AD 350 to 660.

Campbell had been elected Fellow of the Society of Antiquaries of London (FSA) in 1971 and a Fellow of the British Academy (FBA) in 1984.

== Personal life ==
In the 1980s, Campbell moved out of college accommodation and settled in Witney, a village near Oxford. At the age of 71, he married Dr Bӓrbel Brodt on 7 October 2006. They did not have any children, and he was devastated by her death in October 2015. Campbell died at his home on 31 May 2016.

== Selected works ==
- Campbell, James (1965), "England, Scotland and the Hundred Years War in the Fourteenth Century", in Hale, J.R.; Highfield, J.R.L.; Smalley, B. (eds.), Europe in the Late Middle Ages, London: Faber and Faber, pp. 184–216
- Campbell, James (1966), "Bede", in Dorey, T.A. (ed.), Latin Historians, London: Routledge, ISBN 9781032608310
- Campbell, James (1971), "The First Century of Christianity in England", Ampleforth Journal, 76 (1): 12–29
- Campbell, James (1975), "Observations on English Government from the Tenth to the Twelfth Century", Transactions of the Royal Historical Society, 5th Series, 25: 39–54
- Campbell, James (1975). Norwich. Historic Towns. Vol. 2. London: Scolar Press and Historic Towns Trust. ISBN 9780859671842.
- Campbell, James (1979). Bede's Reges and Principes. Jarrow: Parish of Jarrow.
- Campbell, James, ed. (1982). The Anglo-Saxons. Oxford: Phaidon. ISBN 978-0801414824.
- Campbell, James (1986). Essays in Anglo-Saxon history. London: Hambledon Press. ISBN 9780826425737.
- Campbell, James (1995), "The Late Anglo-Saxon State: A Maximum View (Raleigh Lecture on History)" (PDF), Proceedings of the British Academy, 87: 39–65
- Campbell, James (2000). The Anglo-Saxon State. London: Hambledon. ISBN 978-1852851767.
- Maddicott, J.R.; Palliser, D.M. (eds.). The Medieval State: Essays Presented to James Campbell. London: Hambledon Continuum. ISBN 978-1852851958.
