= Peter Greenwood (disambiguation) =

Peter Greenwood may refer to:

- Peter Greenwood (footballer) (1924–2021), English footballer and cricketer
- Peter Greenwood (footballer, born 1938), English footballer, see List of Bury F.C. players (1–24 appearances)
- Peter Greenwood (1962–2021), Australian special effects technician
- Pete Greenwood (born 1980), English singer-songwriter
