= Writ of prohibition =

Writ directing a subordinate to stop doing something the law prohibits

A writ of prohibition is a writ directing a subordinate to stop doing something the law prohibits. This writ is often issued by a superior court to the lower court directing it not to proceed with a case which does not fall under its jurisdiction.

Writs of prohibition can be subdivided into "alternative writs" and "peremptory writs". An alternative writ directs the recipient to immediately act, or desist, and "show cause" why the directive should not be made permanent. A peremptory writ directs the recipient to immediately act, or desist, and "return" the writ, with certification of its compliance, within a certain time.

When an agency of an official body is the target of the writ of prohibition, the writ is directed to the official body over which the court has direct jurisdiction, ordering the official body to cause the agency to desist.

Although the rest of this article speaks to judicial processes, a writ of prohibition may be directed by any court of record (i.e., higher than a misdemeanor court) toward any official body, whether a court or a county, city or town government, that is within the court's jurisdiction.

== In the United States ==
A "writ of prohibition", in the United States, is a court order rendered by a higher court to a judge presiding over a suit in an inferior court. The writ of prohibition mandates the inferior court to cease any action over the case because it may not fall within that inferior court's jurisdiction. The document is also issued at times when it is deemed that an inferior court is acting outside the normal rules and procedures in the examination of a case. In another instance, the document is issued at times when an inferior court is deemed headed towards defeating a legal right.

Prohibition is more often used by appellate courts. Most often, these courts issue writs of prohibition to prevent lower courts from exceeding their jurisdiction. In some cases, this writ may also be used to prevent an inferior court from acting contrary to the rules of natural justice. The writ of prohibition may not be used to undo any previous acts, but only to prohibit acts not completed.

Writs of prohibition are similar to writs of certiorari, as both types of writs allow superior courts to manage inferior courts. However, unlike a writ of prohibition, superior courts issue writs of certiorari to review decisions which inferior courts have already made.

== In India ==
A writ of prohibition is issued primarily to prevent an inferior court or tribunal from exceeding its jurisdiction in cases pending before it or acting contrary to the rules of natural justice. It is issued by a superior court to inferior courts from usurping a jurisdiction with which it was not legally vested, or in other words to compel inferior courts to keep within the limits of their jurisdiction. Thus the writ is issued in both cases where there is excess of jurisdiction and where there is absence of jurisdiction.

Prohibition is not a continuation of the proceedings to be prohibited. Its object is on the contrary to arrest the inferior tribunal's proceedings. It is a collateral matter progress essentially between the two tribunals, an inferior one and other superior one by which the latter, by virtue its power of superintendence over the former, restrains it within its rightful competence. Its nature is held to depend upon the nature of proceeding to be prohibited.

The writ can be issued only when the proceedings are pending in a court if the proceeding has matured into decision, writ will not lie. When the court, before whom the matter is pending, has ceased to exist, in that condition too, the writ of prohibition will not lie because there can be no proceedings upon which it can operate but on the other hand, if the court is functioning, the writ can be issued at any stage of the proceeding before the inferior court or tribunal.

It can be issued only against a judicial and quasiujudicial bodyand not against a legislative or administrative body.

== In English legal history ==
The writs of prohibition were the main means by which the managing common law courts, the King's Bench and Common Pleas, restricted other courts from overstepping their jurisdictional boundaries. The writs originally functioned like administrative orders, though over time they acquired the power of legal commands. Writs could be issued against another court or an individual defendant, somewhat similar to the way an injunction works in courts today. The writs of Prohibition were primarily used against the ecclesiastical courts. However, they were also used against the equity courts, admiralty courts, and local courts. The highest of the equity courts was the Chancery, but although as a fact of law the Chancery could be prohibited, it rarely, if ever, was.

Not obeying a writ could result in imprisonment, fine, or possible damages in favor of the opposing party.

The rise in the use of writs of prohibition accompanied the consolidation of power in the English monarchy and the growth of the court system in the twelfth and thirteenth centuries.

The Angevin kings, who split their time between England and France, needed strong and competent advisors to help run the government in England when they were gone. The growth of the royal bureaucracy accompanied the codification of much of the existing common law with the First Statute of Westminster (1275), which was passed during Edward I's reign.

The common law courts and legal interpretation by common law judges began to become more formalized as judges moved from the role of primary lawmakers to the interpreters of statutes. While the earlier courts had had more flexibility to provide both legal and equitable relief, over the period from the late thirteenth century to the end of the fourteenth century, the consideration of equity gradually disappeared in common law courts, which was one of the reasons the Chancery, which existed before to keep the King's Great Seal and stamp it on public documents, emerged as a separate judicial court. As the common law courts became more formalized and rigid in their procedure and jurisprudence, they also ceased using the writ of prohibition as a remedy against individual defendants.

There were occasional disputes among the courts when there were disagreements about what court was the proper place to hear a certain issue. For example, the ecclesiastical courts claimed they had the right to enforce contracts that were formalized by oath, as they involved a spiritual matter of whether the oath had properly been made, though common lawyers disagreed. In some instances, however, the non-common law courts were able to provide relief where the common law courts could not. The Chancery, unlike the common law court, could provide remedies in cases involving trusts and uses and could give relief based on fraud, accident, or mistake to plaintiffs. As courts of equity provided new relief that before had been encompassed by but limited in the common law courts, writs of prohibition helped prevent plaintiffs from being able to "forum shop" for the court that would be most favorable to their position. Any plaintiff who could gain adequate relief in a common law court was prohibited from bringing his case in a different court, even if he preferred the procedure, allowable defenses, or possible remedies of a different court.

The use of the writ of prohibition also varied with the relationship between the Chancery and the common law judges. While at the beginning of the transformation of the Chancery into a judicial body, the common law judges often cooperated in helping the new court decide cases or even referred plaintiffs who had equitable claims. Over time, however, the relationship declined as plaintiffs chose to seek relief in the Chancery, which was the fourth most popular major court by 1450. In the first half of the fifteenth century, litigants chose to bring their cases there because, despite its growing popularity, the Chancery still saw many fewer cases than the common law court, which allowed cases to be resolved more quickly than in the common law courts, which were known for being slow. Additionally, the Chancery allowed testimony of interested parties and witnesses and could compel discovery and specific relief, which the common law courts could not.

=== Procedure for securing a writ of prohibition ===
In the 13th century, the writs of prohibition were issued by the Chancery. However, by the later half of the 16th century, the writs of prohibition had become a judicial writ. That meant that if a party wanted to halt proceedings in another court on the grounds that the presiding court did not have proper jurisdictional authority, the party would petition the managing courts to do one of the following things: (1) eliminate liability altogether by applying common law, (2) have the case be sued de novo at common law, or (3) secure trial by the common law method of a jury or judicial ruling. Prior to deciding whether or not to grant the writ, the managing court would usually allow for open-court debate between the plaintiff seeking prohibition, the defendant opposing prohibition, and/or the judges themselves. However, writs of prohibition could be granted without such debate.

=== Contesting a writ of prohibition ===
If a party wanted to contest the granting of a writ of prohibition, they could do so in two ways. The first was a contempt proceeding called the "Attachment on Prohibition", wherein the plaintiff and defendant would plead before the managing court on the validity of the writ. Alternatively, the parties could seek to reverse the writ of prohibition by seeking a writ of Consultation.

As writs of prohibition were rather easy to obtain, in the late thirteenth century, writs of Consultation came into use. If a prohibited party or judge felt that a case rightly fell within the prohibited court's jurisdiction, they could question its appropriateness before the Chancellor. If the Chancellor agreed, he could issue a writ of Consultation, reversing the writ of prohibition and allowing the case to continue in the ecclesiastical court.

=== Justifications for writs of prohibition ===
In addition to threatening the king's authority, the existence of jurisdictional overlap jeopardized the uniformity of legal remedies by allowing for forum-shopping. For example, both the king and the Church claimed jurisdiction over disputes between executors and debtors and between creditors and executors. In the Church's eyes, the right of the executor to collect debts from a decedent's debtors and the right of creditors to enforce theirs claims against a decedent's estate were "a proper part of probate administration". Thus, while for most obligations a testator would have to sue under common law, an executor or creditor could choose between initiating a proceeding in a secular or ecclesiastical court. By issuing a writ of prohibition restraining executors or creditors from suing in an ecclesiastical court, this inequitable disparity in forum options could be resolved.

== Bibliography ==
- Charles M. Gray (1976). "Boundaries of the Equitable Function" (PDF). The American Journal of Legal History. 20 (3): 192–226. doi:10.2307/845114. JSTOR 845114.
- Charles M. Gray (1994). The Writ of Prohibition: Jurisdiction in Early Modern English Law (PDF).
- Richard H. Helmholz (1975). "Writs of Prohibition and Ecclesiastical Sanctions in the English Courts Christian". Minnesota Law Review. 60: 1011.
- Theodore Plucknett (1956). A Concise History of the Common Law (PDF).
- Theodore Plucknett (1922). Statutes and Their Interpretation in the First Half of the Fourteenth Century. Cambridge : The University press.
- David W. Raack (1986). "A History of Injunctions in England Before 1700". Indiana Law Journal. 61: 539.
