= Hugh Hale Bellot =

Hugh Hale Leigh Bellot FRHistS (26 January 1890 – 18 February 1969) was an English historian; he was Professor of American History and Vice-Chancellor of the University of London from 1951 to 1953. His writings were published under the name "H. Hale Bellot".

== Early life and education ==
He was the elder son of Hugh Hale Leigh Bellot MD FRCS (1860-1927), a barrister and alumnus of Trinity College, Oxford, and Beatrice Violette Clarke, and was born in Addlestone, Surrey. He was educated at Bedales School and then won a scholarship to Lincoln College, Oxford.

== Career ==
He was a master at the Battersea Polytechnic Secondary School (later Henry Thornton Grammar School from 1929 and currently Lambeth Academy) and then Bedales School. In 1915 he became a customs clerk until the end of the First World War. In 1921 he was appointed an assistant in history at University College London. He became senior lecturer in 1926 and in 1927 moved to the University of Manchester as Reader in Modern History. From 1930-1955 he was Professor of American History at London University with a spell as Sir George Watson Lecturer at the University of Birmingham in 1938 and also from 1940-1944 he was a principal at the Board of Trade.

He served on the Senate of London University from 1938 to 1956 and held various other positions with the university including as Vice-Chancellor from 1951 to 1953. Much of Bellot's work was as a source discoverer and compiler, and published in academic journals.

He was honorary secretary of the Royal Historical Society from 1934 to 1952 and its President from 1952 to 1956.

== Publications ==
- 1923: "Commerce in War" Hugh Hale Leigh Bellot (Author) with Llewellyn Archer Atherley-Jones c. 1923. Reprinted in paperback, Ulan Press (4 Jun 2011) ASIN: B009L5AQSQ
- 1929: University College London 1826-1926
- 1933,1934: Parliamentary printing, 1630-1837
- 1937: The Place of American History in English Education
- 1952: American History and American Historians: A Review of Recent Contributions to the Interpretation of the History of the United States
- 1955: Woodrow Wilson
- 1956: The Leighs in South Carolina
- 1957: The Literature of the last half-century on the constitutional history of the United States
- 1959: Union list of American historical periodicals in United Kingdom libraries

== See also ==
- List of Vice-Chancellors of the University of London
- Creighton Lecture (1954)

Academic offices
Preceded by Dame Lillian Penson	Vice-Chancellor of the University of London; 1951-53	Succeeded by Sir Roderic Hill
Preceded by Theodore Plucknett	President of the Royal Historical Society; 1953–1957	Succeeded by David Knowles
