= Richard Vinen =

British historian and academic

Richard Charles Vinen (born 1963) is a British historian and academic who holds a professorship at King's College London. Vinen is a specialist in 20th-century European history, particularly of Britain and France. His last book is The Last Titans: Churchill and de Gaulle, published in 2025.

== Life ==
Born in 1963 in Birmingham, Vinen grew up on the Bournville Estate. His father, Joe Vinen, was a professor of physics, specialising in low temperature physics.. From 1982 to 1989, Richard Vinen attended Trinity College, Cambridge, graduating with a Bachelor of Arts degree in 1985, and then completing his doctoral studies there; his PhD was awarded in 1989 for his thesis "The politics of French Business 1936–1945", supervised by Christopher Andrew.

=== Academic career ===
Vinen was a Fellow at Trinity from 1988 to 1992, and was a part-time lecturer at Queen Mary University of London from 1988 to 1991. He eventually moved to London where he and his wife lived in a succession of louche locations early in his career. He has written that "the Serious Crime Squad once installed a camera in our bedroom so that they could keep an eye on one of our neighbours."

After lecturing at Queen Mary, he joined King's College London in 1991 as a lecturer; he was promoted to a readership in 2001, and was appointed professor of history in 2007.

=== Work ===
Vinen's book National Service: Conscription in Britain, 1945–1963 (2014) received generally positive reviews. On 13 May 2015, he was presented with a Wolfson History Prize and Templer Medal for it. He also won the Walter Laqueur Prize in 2012 (recognising the best article in Journal of Contemporary History of the previous year) for "The Poisoned Madeleine: The Autobiographical Turn in Historical Writing". In 2018, Vinen delivered the Institute of Historical Research's Creighton Lecture on the topic "When was Thatcherism?". In 2020, he was one of three historians invited to give the Historical Research Lecture; it was entitled "Writing histories of 2020".

== Books ==
- The Politics of French Business 1936–1945. Cambridge: Cambridge University Press, 1991. ISBN 0521404401
- Bourgeois Politics in France, 1945–1951. Cambridge: Cambridge University Press, 1995. ISBN 0521474515
- France, 1934–1970. Basingstoke: Macmillan, 1996. ISBN 0333613597
- A History in Fragments: Europe in the Twentieth Century. London: Little, Brown, & Co., 2000. ISBN 0316853747
- The Unfree French: Life under Occupation. London: Penguin, 2006. ISBN 0300121326
- Thatcher's Britain. London: Simon & Schuster, 2009. ISBN 9781847371751
- National Service: Conscription in Britain 1945–1963. London: Allen Lane, 2014. ISBN 184614387X
- The Long '68: Radical Protest and Its Enemies. London: Allen Lane, 2018. ISBN 0241343429
- Second City: Birmingham and the Forging of Modern Britain. London: Penguin, 2022. ISBN 0241454565
- The Last Titans: Churchill and de Gaulle. London: Bloomsbury, 2025. ISBN 1526668939
