= Loubat Prize =

The Loubat Prize was a pair of prizes awarded by Columbia University every five years between 1898 and 1958 for the best social science works in the English language about North America.

The awards were established and endowed by Joseph Florimond, Duc de Loubat in 1893. The awards were given "in recognition of the best works printed in the English language on the history, geography, archaeology, ethnology, philology, or numismatics of North America."

Note that Loubat Prizes were also awarded to acknowledge outstanding social science works about North America in a number of European countries from e.g. The Royal Swedish Academy of Letters, History and Antiquities and the Royal Prussian Academy of Sciences.

Winners of the Loubat Prize
Year	Awardee	Award
1898	William Henry Holmes for Stone Implements of the Potomac-Chesapeake Tidewater Provinces	$1,000
1913	George Louis Beer for The Origins of the British Colonial System, 1578-1660	$1,000
1913	John Reed Swanton for Tlinget Myths and Texts and Indian Tribes of the Lower Mississippi Valley and Adjacent Coasts of the Gulf of Mexico	$400
1918	Clarence Walworth Alvord for The Mississippi Valley in American Politics	$1,000
1918	Herbert Ingram Priestley for José de Galvez, Visitor-General of New Spain, 1765-1771	$400
1923	Justin Harvey Smith for The War with Mexico	$1,000
1923	William Henry Holmes for Handbook of American Aboriginal Antiquities	$400
1933	Charles O. Paullin and John Kirtland Wright for Atlas of the Historical Geography of the United States	$1,000
1933	Walter Prescott Webb for The Great Plains	$400
1938	Samuel E. Morison for The Founding of Harvard College and Harvard College in the Seventeenth Century	$1,000
1938	Samuel Kirkland Lothrop for Cocle: An Archaeological Study of Central Panama, Part I	$400
1943	Sylvanus G. Morley for The Inscriptions of Peten	$1,000
1943	Edmund Cody Burnett for The Continental Congress	$400
1948	Lawrence H. Gipson for The British Empire Before the American Revolution	$1,000
1948	Hans Kurath for Linguistic Atlas of New England	$400
1953	James G. Randall for Midstream–Lincoln the President	$1,000
1953	Ralph H. Brown for Historical Geography of the United States	$500
1958	Douglas S. Freeman for George Washington: A Biography	$1,200
1958	Henry A. Pochmann for German Culture in America, 1600-1900	$600

== See also ==
- List of social sciences awards
