= Journal of Religion in Africa =

- Discipline: Religious studies
- Language: English

Publication details
- History: 1967-present
- Publisher: Brill Publishers
- Frequency: Quarterly

Standard abbreviations
- ISO 4: J. Relig. Afr.

Indexing
- ISSN: 0022-4200 (print); 1570-0666 (web)
- LCCN: 2005-237368
- OCLC no.: 50924590

Links
- Journal homepage; Online access

The Journal of Religion in Africa is a quarterly academic journal established in 1967 by Andrew Walls. It focuses on all religious traditions in Africa. It is an academic journal that focuses on the study of religion in Africa. It publishes scholarly articles, research papers, and book reviews related to various aspects of African religions, including their historical development, belief systems, rituals, and social implications.

The journal was first established by Walls in 1967 as the Journal of Religion in Africa: Studies in Comparative Religion. It was founded by the African Association for the Study of Religions (AASR) and initially published by Brill Publishers, a leading Dutch firm. It played a prominent role in establishing the academic field of religious studies in Africa and providing a platform for scholars to share their research and insights. It covers a wide range of topics related to African religions, including traditional African religions, Islam, Christianity, African diaspora religions, and new religious movements in Africa. Over the years, the journal has evolved and adapted to reflect the changing landscape of religious studies and the growing interest in the study of African religions. It has expanded its editorial board to include scholars from various countries and academic institutions, ensuring a diverse range of perspectives and expertise. In recent years, it has moved from print-only publication to a digital format, making its content more accessible to researchers around the world. Its goal is to publish high-quality research that contributes to our understanding of the complex and diverse religious traditions in Africa.

== Notable people ==
- David Maxwell, editor from 1998 to 2005
- Andrew Walls, journal founder
