= Polly Paulusma =

British singer-songwriter

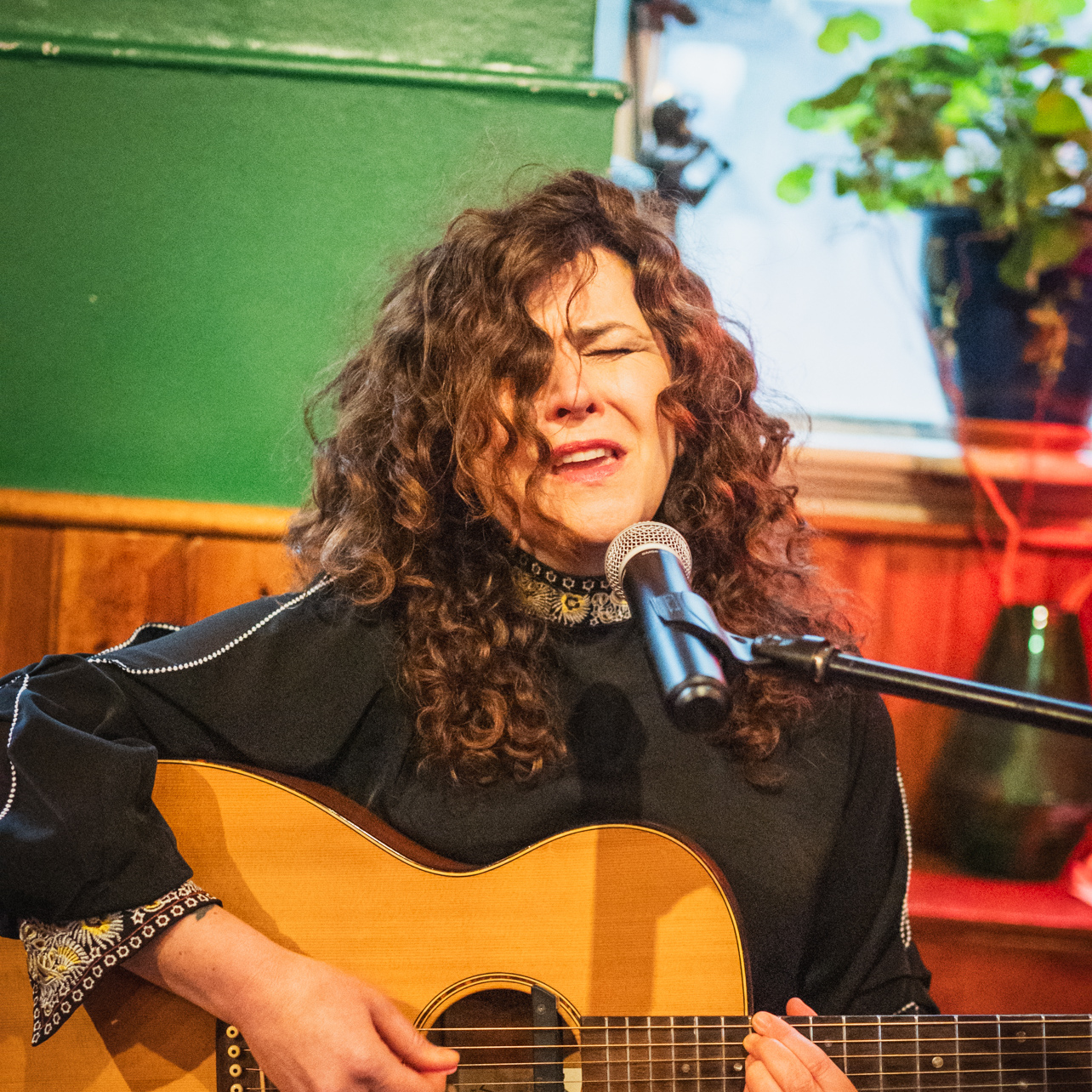
- in 2026

Background information
- Also known as: Hippolyta (Polly) Paulusma
- Born: Polly Riley-Smith; 10 November 1976 (age 49)
- Genres: Indie pop
- Occupations: Singer-songwriter, musician
- Instruments: Vocals, guitar, piano, keyboards
- Years active: 2004–present
- Labels: One Little Indian Records
- Website: http://www.pollypaulusma.com http://www.myspace.com/pollypaulusma

Polly Paulusma /ˈpɔːlzmə/ (born 10 November 1976) is an English singer-songwriter.

== Career ==
Paulusma's first album, Scissors in my Pocket, was largely recorded and produced by herself at her home. Her second album, Cosmic Rosy Spine Kites (an anagram of the first album's title) features the same tracks, four of which were recorded with a string quartet; the rest at a gig in Manchester, England, where she supported Jamie Cullum. She has supported other artists on tour including; Marianne Faithfull and Coldplay. Paulusma played at the Glastonbury Festival in 2005.

In 2004, Paulusma self-produced her first album using her computer. Paulusma and her management used the internet, just as it was becoming widely accessible, and other contemporary methods of distribution to reach a larger audience. Two of Paulusma's tracks, "Over the Hill" and the live version of "She Moves in Secret Ways", were issued as free downloads through Apple's iTunes Store. Paulusma was one of the first musicians to use Myspace, her own website, blogs, and a link to a forum, to connect with them and keep them up-to-date on her touring and recording plans.

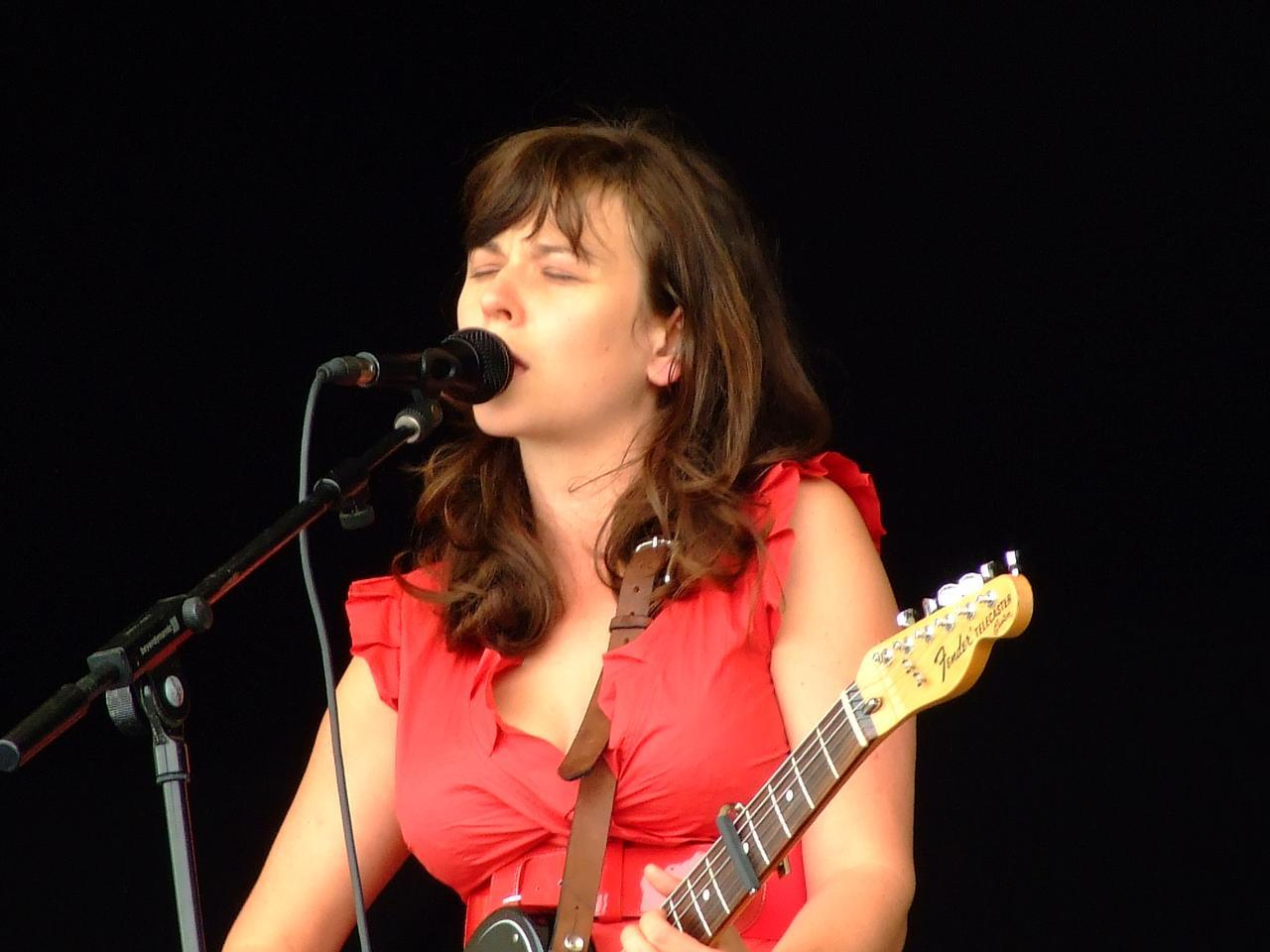
Paulusma at the Coventry Godiva Festival in 2007

Paulusma's third album Fingers and Thumbs was released in the June 2007 with its corresponding sister album Fights and Numbers as an iTunes-only digital download. Paulusma founded a small record label called Wild Sound Recordings Ltd in 2012 and in 2012 released Leaves from the Family Tree with its corresponding sister-album The Small Feat of my Reverie in 2014. Since 2012 Wild Sound has signed nine indie folk artists including Maz O'Connor, Stylusboy, Harry Harris, Matthew The Oxx, Dan Wilde and Mortal Tides.

Paulusma teaches Cambridge English undergraduates in Practical Criticism as part of the English Tripos. Paulusma is a postgraduate CHASE scholar at the University of East Anglia where she is researching the influence of traditional folksong on the writings of the British novelist Angela Carter.

== Critical acclaim ==
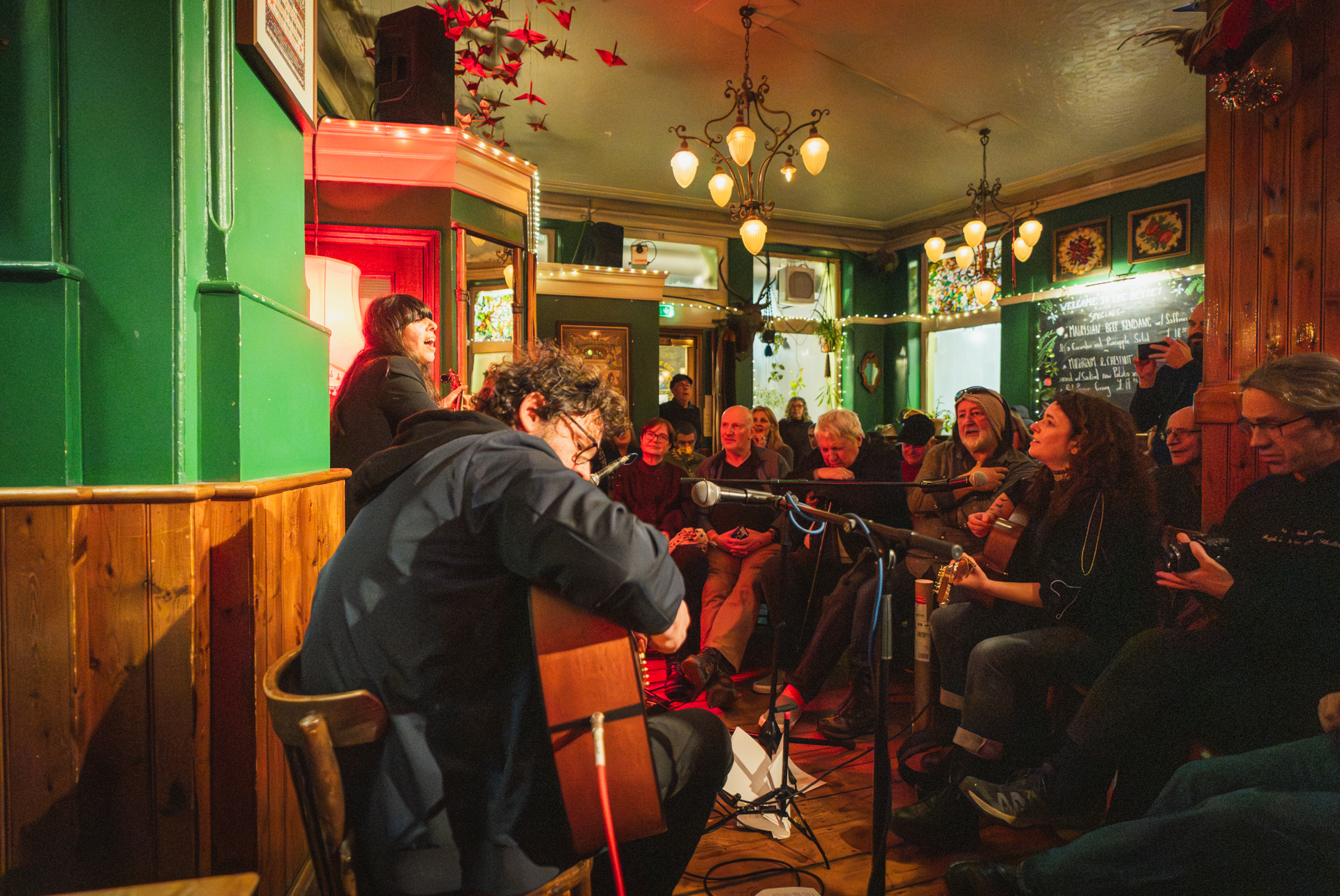
Emma Tricca, Pete Greenwood and Polly Paulusma in 2026

In 2004, The Guardian described Paulusma on Scissors in My Pocket as, "a voice capable of some unexpected twists". Rolling Stone said Scissors in My Pocket was “an enchanting debut of understated, intelligent folk pop”. Uncut suggested Paulusma could be "a worthy successor" to Joni Mitchell. In 2012, Space City Rock reviewed Leaves From The Family Tree, stating, "this could be a huge album". In 2021, For Folk's Sake reviewed Invisible Music: folk songs that influenced Angela Carter, calling it "a literary, clever, erudite, elegantly crafted offering from Polly Paulusma". In 2022, Folking called Paulusma's The Pivot On Which The World Turns "a record that has an immense heartbeat with an eternal pulse".

== Personal life ==
Paulusma is the daughter of medieval historian Jonathan Riley-Smith.

Paulusma's first son was born on 10 November 2006 and her second son was born on 1 August 2008.

Paulusma and her husband, Mick Paulusma, lived in the narrowest home in London for 12 years. Located in Battersea, the 7-foot-7-inch-wide (2.31 m) home was where Paulusma recorded her first album Scissors in my Pocket and the demos for Fingers & Thumbs. Since 2010, the couple have lived in Cambridge, England.

== Discography ==
- Scissors in My Pocket (2004)
- Dark Side (2004, single, with B-side)
- Cosmic Rosy Spine Kites (2005, live)
- Fingers & Thumbs (2007)
- Fights & Numbers (2007, iTunes only)
- Leaves From The Family Tree (2012)
- The Small Feat of My Reverie (2014)
- Invisible Music - Folk Songs That Influenced Angela Carter (2021)
- The Pivot On Which The World Turns (2022)
- When Violent Hot Pitch Words Hurt (2023)
- Wildfires (2025, double album)
