= W. N. Medlicott =

British historian (1900–1987)

William Norton Medlicott CBE (11 May 1900 – 7 October 1987) was a British historian.

He was educated at Haberdashers' Aske's Hatcham College, University College London and the Institute of Historical Research.

In 1926 Medlicott took up a post at University College, Swansea and in 1936 he married Dorothy Kathleen Coveney. Medlicott worked at the Board of Trade for the first year of the Second World War before being selected by Sir Keith Hancock to be a member of the Cabinet Office Historical Section. Medlicott published the results of his research in his two-volume work The Economic Blockade.

From 1945 to 1953 he was Professor of History at the University College of the South-West and in 1953 he was elected to the Stevenson Chair of International History at the University of London. Medlicott succeeded in transforming it into the largest and most successful department of its type in Britain. In his works he sought to interpret twentieth-century international relations in relation to strategic and economic factors.

In 1968 he was appointed to deliver the Creighton Lecture, published a year later as Britain and Germany: The Search for an Agreement. He was also secretary and president of the Historical Association for six years and was prominent in the Royal Institute of International Affairs. After a proposal from Donald Read, the Medlicott Medal was established in 1985 to recognise services to history.

== Works ==
- The Congress of Berlin and After (London: Methuen, 1938; 2nd ed. 1963).
- British Foreign Policy since Versailles (London: Methuen, 1940; 2nd ed. 1968).
- The Economic Blockade:
  - Volume I (London: His Majesty's Stationery Office, 1952).
  - Volume II (London: Her Majesty's Stationery Office, 1959).
- Bismarck, Gladstone and the Concert of Europe (London: University of London Athlone Press, 1956).
- The Coming of War in 1939 (London: George Routledge and Kegan Paul for The Historical Association, 1963).
- Bismarck and Modern Germany (London: The English Universities Press, 1965).
- Contemporary England, 1914–1964 (London: Longmans, 1967).
- Britain and Germany: The Search for an Agreement (London: University of London Athlone Press, 1969).
