= Jonathan Riley-Smith =

British historian

Jonathan Riley-Smith GCStJ FRHistS

Dixie Professor of Ecclesiastical History University of Cambridge
- In office 1994–2011
- Preceded by: Christopher N. L. Brooke
- Succeeded by: David Maxwell

Personal details
- Born: Jonathan Simon Christopher Riley-Smith; 27 June 1938 Harrogate, England
- Died: 13 September 2016 (aged 78)
- Citizenship: British
- Parent(s): William Henry Douglas Riley-Smith; Elspeth Agnes Mary Craik Henderson
- Education: Trinity College, Cambridge

Jonathan Simon Christopher Riley-Smith (27 June 1938 – 13 September 2016) was a historian of the Crusades, and, between 1994 and 2005, Dixie Professor of Ecclesiastical History at Cambridge. He was a Fellow of Emmanuel College, Cambridge. He has been described as "quite simply the leading historian of the crusades anywhere in the world".

== Early life ==
Riley-Smith was the eldest of four children born into a prosperous Yorkshire brewing family. His maternal grandfather (to whose memory he later dedicated his book What Were the Crusades?) was the British Conservative Party MP, John Craik-Henderson (1890-1971). He attended Eton College and Trinity College, Cambridge, where he took his BA (1960), MA (1964), PhD (1964), and LittD (2001).

== Academic career ==
Riley-Smith taught at the University of St Andrews (1964–1972), Queens' College, Cambridge (1972-1978), Royal Holloway College, London (1978–1994) as well as at Emmanuel (1994–2005). His many publications focus on the origins of the crusading movement and the motivations of the first crusaders, and suggests that the First Crusade was primarily inspired by religious idealism, penitence, and sympathy for eastern Christians rather than a desire for material gains.

He was appointed a Knight of Grace and Devotion of the Sovereign Military Order of Malta and a Bailiff Grand Cross of the Most Venerable Order of the Hospital of Saint John of Jerusalem.

Riley-Smith appeared in the documentary series Crusades (1995) as an historical authority. However, the series adopted the views of Steven Runciman, which were not held by Riley-Smith. The producers then edited the taped interviews so that the historians seemed to agree with Runciman. Riley-Smith said of the producers that "they made me appear to say things that I do not believe!" In 2006, he delivered the Gifford Lectures on The Crusades and Christianity at the University of Edinburgh.

== Personal life ==
Riley-Smith was a convert to Catholicism. He married Marie-Louise Field, a portrait artist, in 1968. Their three children include the singer/songwriter Polly Paulusma.

Jonathan Riley-Smith died on 13 September 2016. Marie-Louise Riley-Smith died in 2026.

== Bibliography ==
- The Knights of St John in Jerusalem and Cyprus, c. 1050–1310 (London, Macmillan, 1967, reprinted 2002)
- Ibn al-Furat (1971). Jonathan Riley-Smith (ed.). Ayyubids, Mamlukes and Crusaders: Text. Vol. 1. Translation by Malcolm Cameron Lyons, Ursula Lyons. W. Heffer. ISBN 9780852700587.
- Ibn al-Furat (1971). Jonathan Riley-Smith (ed.). Ayyubids, Mamlukes and Crusaders; selections from the Tarikh al-duwal wa'l-Muluk. Vol. 2. Translation by Malcolm Cameron Lyons, Ursula Lyons. Cambridge: W. Heffer.
- The Feudal Nobility and the Kingdom of Jerusalem, 1174–1277 (London, Macmillan, 1973, reprinted 2002)
- What Were the Crusades? (London, Macmillan, 1977, 2nd edition 1992, 3rd edition Basingstoke, Palgrave, 2002)
- The Crusades: Idea and Reality, 1095–1274, with Louise Riley-Smith (London, Edward Arnold, 1981)
- The First Crusade and the Idea of Crusading (London and Philadelphia, Athlone/ University of Pennsylvania Press, 1986, paperback US 1990, UK 1993)
- The Crusades: A Short History (London and New Haven, Athlone/ Yale University Press, 1987, also in paperback, translated into French, Italian and Polish)
- The Atlas of the Crusades (editor) (London and New York, Times Books/ Facts on File, 1991, translated into German and French)
- The Oxford Illustrated History of the Crusades, editor (Oxford, Oxford University Press, 1995, paperback 1997, now reissued as The Oxford History of the Crusades, paperback, 1999, translated into Russian, German and Polish)
- Cyprus and the Crusades, editor, with Nicholas Coureas) (Nicosia, Society for the Study of the Crusades and the Latin East and Cyprus Research Centre, 1995)
- Montjoie: Studies in Crusade History in Honour of Hans Eberhard Mayer, editor, with Benjamin Z. Kedar and Rudolf Hiestand (Aldershot, Variorum, 1997)
- The First Crusaders, 1095–1131 (Cambridge, Cambridge University Press, 1997, paperback 1998 and 2000)
- Hospitallers: The History of the Order of St. John (London, The Hambledon Press, 1999, also in paperback, translated into Russian)
- Al seguito delle Crociate Rome (Di Renzo: Dialoghi Uomo e Societΰ, 2000)
- Dei gesta per Francos: Etudes sur les croisades dιdiιes ΰ Jean Richard, editor, with M. Balard and B.Z. Kedar (Aldershot (Ashgate), 2001)
- The Crusades, Christianity, and Islam (Columbia University Press, 2008)
- The Knights Hospitaller in the Levant 1070–1309 (Basingstoke, 2012)
