= George Louis Beer =

American historian (1872–1920)

- Born: July 26, 1872; Staten Island, NY, US
- Died: March 15, 1920 (aged 47); New York, NY, US
- Education: Columbia University
- Occupation: Historian
- Writing career
- Period: 1893 - 1923
- Subjects: American History, Colonial History
- Notable awards: Loubat Prize (1913)

George Louis Beer (July 26, 1872 – March 15, 1920) was an American historian of the "Imperial school". He was colonial expert to President Woodrow Wilson's American Commission of Inquiry during World War I and attended the 1919 Paris Peace Conference as a member of the American Commission to Negotiate Peace.

== Early life and education ==
Beer was born in Staten Island, New York, to an affluent family that was prominent in New York's German-Jewish community. His father owned a successful Cuban tobacco importing business. He studied at Columbia University, where he received the A.B. degree (1892) and then an A.M. degree in 1893. Beer's master's thesis, "The Commercial Policy of England Toward the American Colonies", was supervised by Professor Herbert Levi Osgood and was immediately published in the series Columbia University Studies in History, Economics and Public Law. Beer was also influenced by John W. Burgess and Edwin Seligman.

== Academic career ==
Beer taught European History at Columbia from 1893 to 1897 while he also worked in the tobacco business.

After retiring from business in 1903, he devoted his time to extensive research in British archives, and wrote three highly regarded and influential books on the British-American colonial period. In 1913, he was the first Loubat Prize recipient for The Origins of the British Colonial System, 1578-1660, one of those books. His work The English Speaking Peoples, was published in 1917. He stressed the successful workings of the commercial dimensions of the British Empire and was part of the "Imperial School" which emphasized the economic benefits and efficient administration of the Empire. He was American correspondent of the British Round Table Journal.

== Advisor to Woodrow Wilson ==
Beer served as colonial expert to President Woodrow Wilson's American Commission of Inquiry during World War I and attended the 1919 Paris Peace Conference as a member of the American Commission to Negotiate Peace, for which he was chief of the Colonial Division in 1918-1919. He was also a member of the Mandates Commission of the League of Nations and was appointed director of the Mandatory Section of the League's Secretariat in 1919.

Beer was a strong proponent of an Anglo-American alliance, arguing it would contribute to greater peace in world politics.

Beer opposed giving Germany back its colonies. Beer did not consider the prospect of Africans governing themselves, as "the negro race has hitherto shown no capacity for progressive development except under the tutelage of other peoples." He supported a mandates system whereby former colonies were governed through international collaboration in a way distinguishable from imperial rule and under open public scrutiny. Beer wanted an American mandate for Cameroon.

At the League of Nations negotiations, Beer describes Wilson as having ignored the reports and plans prepared before the negotiations, as well as the dozens of experts that were part of the American delegation. According to Beer, American experts tried to give ideas to the French who would pass them onto the British in the hopes that the British brought them to Wilson. At one point during the negotiation, Wilson left it to Beer and Edward House to negotiate on his behalf. Beer said of Wilson, "Wilson is strong on principles a sophomore might enunciate, but is absurdly weak on their application."

== Permanent Mandates Commission ==
Sir Eric Drummond, the first Secretary General of the League of Nations, appointed Beer as the head of the Mandates Section of the League of Nations's permanent secretariat. Due to Beer's absence, much of the work in the mandates section was done by Philip Noel-Baker instead.

== The George Louis Beer Prize ==
Beer left a bequest to establish a prize recognizing outstanding historical writing relating to European international history since 1895. American citizens or permanent residents are eligible, for books published in the year preceding the award. The George Louis Beer Prize has been awarded in most years since 1923 by the American Historical Association.

== Personal life ==
Beer married Edith Hellman on November 11, 1896. She was the niece of one of his early mentors at Columbia, E. R. A. Seligman, who had married Beer's sister. Beer and his wife had one daughter, and the marriage lasted until Beer's untimely death on March 15, 1920.

== Selected works ==
- The Commercial Policy of England Toward the American Colonies (1893) full text online.
- British Colonial Policy, 1754-1765 (1907) full text online.
- Origins of the British Colonial System, 1578-1660 (1908) full text online.
- The Old Colonial System, 1660-1754 (2 vols., 1912) full text online.
- Beer, George Louis (July 1916). "America's International Responsibilities and Foreign Policy". The Annals of the American Academy of Political and Social Science. 66 (1): 71–91. doi:10.1177/000271621606600112. hdl:2027/mdp.39015073399266.
- The English Speaking Peoples: Their Future Relations and Joint International Obligations (1917) full text online.
- African Questions at the Paris Peace Conference (1923) full text online.

== Sources ==
- Coclanis, Peter A. "George L. Beer." In Clyde Norman Wilson (ed.), American Historians, 1866-1912. Dictionary of Literary Biography Vol. 47. Detroit: Gale Research, 1986. Literature Resource Center. Web. 20 Oct. 2014.
- Maranian, Harry (1958). George Louis Beer: A New Accent on American Colonial Relations with Great Britain (Thesis). OCLC 55994123.
- Pedersen, Susan (2015). The Guardians: The League of Nations and the Crisis of Empire. doi:10.1093/acprof:oso/9780199570485.001.0001. ISBN 978-0-19-957048-5.
- Schuyler, Robert Livingston. "Beer, George Louis." In Allen Johnson et al. (eds.), Dictionary of American Biography (New York: Charles Scribner's Sons, 1936).

== See also ==
- Historiography of the British Empire
