= David Maxwell (historian) =

Professor David Maxwell

Dixie Professor of Ecclesiastical History University of Cambridge
- Incumbent
- Assumed office 2011
- Preceded by: Jonathan Riley-Smith

Personal details
- Born: David James Maxwell; 8 December 1963 (age 62) Bushey, Hertfordshire, England
- Citizenship: United Kingdom
- Education: University of Manchester; St Antony's College, Oxford

David James Maxwell (born 8 December 1963) is a British historian and academic, specialising in the missionary movement and Christianity in Africa. He is the Dixie Professor of Ecclesiastical History at the University of Cambridge and professorial fellow of Emmanuel College.

== Early life ==
Maxwell was born on 8 December 1963 in Bushey, Hertfordshire, England. He studied history at the University of Manchester, graduating with a Bachelor of Arts (BA) degree in 1986. He went on to undertake postgraduate research in African History at St Antony's College, Oxford, and graduated with a Doctor of Philosophy (DPhil) degree in 1994. His doctoral thesis was titled "A social and conceptual history of North-East Zimbabwe, 1890–1990".

== Academic career ==
Maxwell began his academic career not as a lecturer but as a teacher. Between his bachelor's degree and doctorate, he taught for three years in a rural secondary school in Manicaland, Zimbabwe.

While completing his doctorate, Maxwell was a fellow of the Social Anthropology Department, University of Manchester. In 1994, he joined Keele University as a lecturer in international history. In 2007, he was promoted to professor of African history. He was an elected member of the Senate of Keele University for the 2009 to 2010 academic year. In 2011, he left Keele to join the University of Cambridge. At Cambridge, he is the Dixie Professor of Ecclesiastical History and is a professorial fellow of Emmanuel College.

Maxwell was editor of the Journal of Religion in Africa from 1998 to 2005. He was vice-president of the African Studies Association of the UK from 2012 to 2014 and president from 2014 to 2016. He is a member of the editorial board of The Journal of Ecclesiastical History.

== Honours ==
In 1996, Maxwell was the recipient of the Audrey Richards prize for the best doctoral thesis in African Studies.
