= Mandell Creighton =

British historian and bishop (1843–1901)

The Right Reverend and Right Honourable Mandell Creighton
- Bishop of London
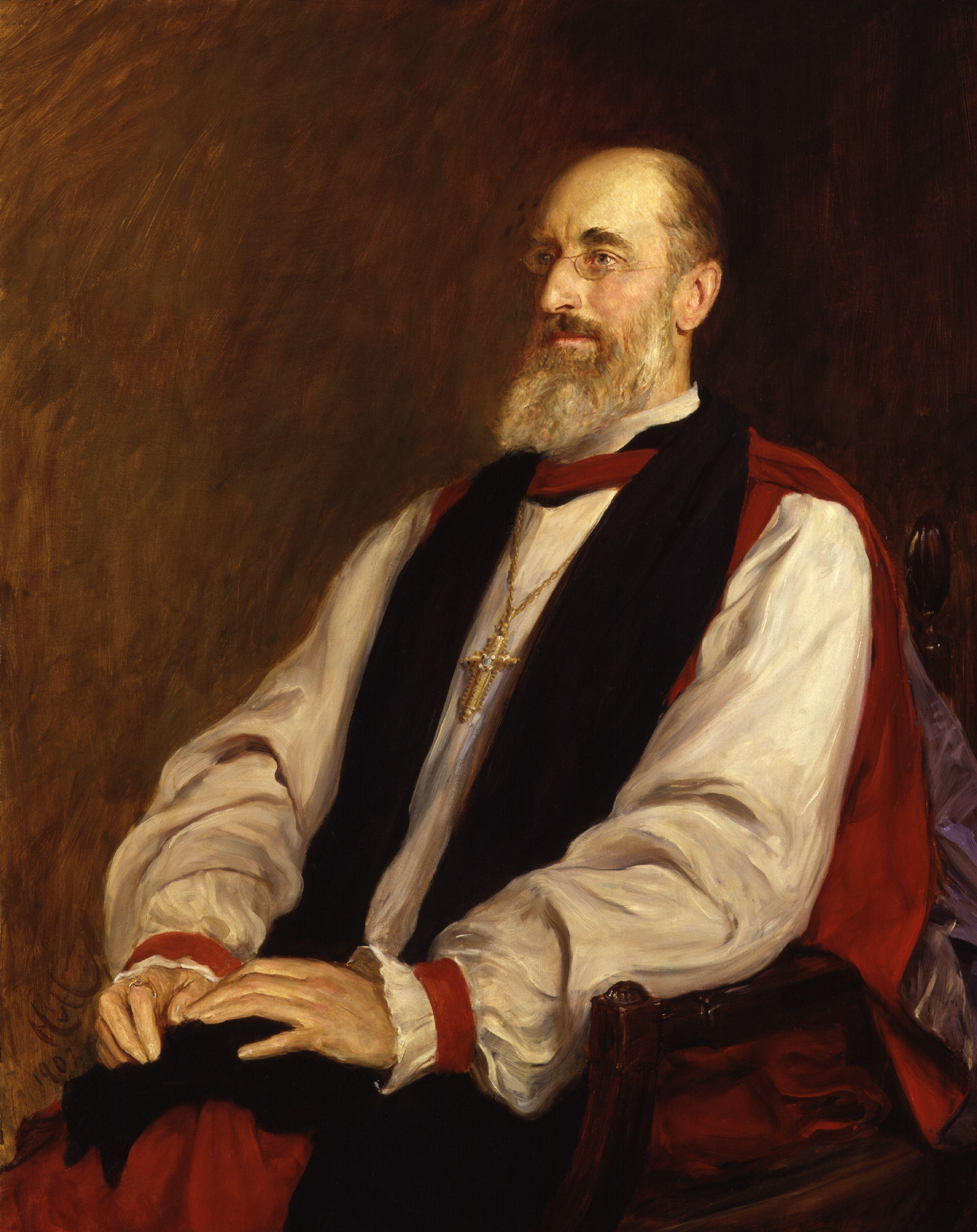
- Posthumous portrait of Creighton as Bishop of London
- Church: Church of England
- Diocese: Diocese of London
- Installed: January 1897
- Term ended: 1901 (death)
- Predecessor: Frederick Temple
- Successor: Arthur Winnington-Ingram
- Other posts: Bishop of Peterborough 1891–1896; Dixie Professor of Ecclesiastical History 1884–1891

Orders
- Ordination: 1870 (deacon); 1873 (priest)

Personal details
- Born: 5 July 1843 Carlisle, Cumberland, England
- Died: 14 January 1901 (aged 57) London, England
- Buried: St Paul's Cathedral, London
- Denomination: Anglican
- Spouse: Louise von Glehn (m. 1872)
- Children: 7
- Education: Merton College, Oxford

Mandell Creighton (/ˈmændəl ˈkraɪtən/; 5 July 1843 – 14 January 1901) was a British historian, Anglican priest and bishop. The son of a successful cabinet-maker in north-west England, Creighton studied at the University of Oxford, focusing his scholarship on the Renaissance Papacy, and then became a don in 1866. He was appointed the first occupant of the Dixie Chair of Ecclesiastical History at the University of Cambridge in 1884. The following year, he also was engaged as the founding editor of The English Historical Review, the first English-language academic journal in its field. In these posts, he helped to establish history as an independent academic discipline in England.

In addition to his work as a historian, Creighton had a career in the clergy of the Church of England from the mid-1870s until his death. He served as a parish priest in Embleton, Northumberland, and later, successively, as a canon residentiary of Worcester Cathedral (1885), Bishop of Peterborough (1891) and Bishop of London (1897). His moderation and practicality drew praise from Queen Victoria and won notice from politicians. In later years, he was appointed to various positions of trust, including the Privy Council, and it was widely thought that he would have become Archbishop of Canterbury had his death, at the age of 57, not supervened.

As a historian, Creighton's magnum opus was A History of the Papacy during the Period of the Reformation, published in five volumes between 1882 and 1894. His historical work received mixed reviews. He was praised for scrupulous even-handedness, but criticised for not taking a stand against historical excesses. He was firm in asserting that public figures should be judged for their public acts, not private ones. He believed that the Church of England was uniquely shaped by its particular English circumstances, and he saw it as the soul of the nation.

Creighton was married to the author and future women's suffrage activist Louise Creighton, and the couple had seven children.

== Early childhood, 1843–1857 ==
Mandell Creighton was born on 5 July 1843 in the border country city of Carlisle, Cumberland (now in Cumbria); he was the eldest child of Sarah (née Mandell) and Robert Creighton. His mother was a daughter of Thomas Mandell, a yeoman farmer from Bolton, Cumberland. His father, a carpenter, built a successful cabinet-making business in Carlisle. Mandell's younger siblings were James (born 1844), Mary (born and died in 1845) and Mary Ellen (known as Polly, born 1849). In 1850, when Mandell was seven Sarah Creighton died unexpectedly. Robert, who never remarried and seldom spoke of his wife again, raised the children with help from his unmarried sister, who came to live with the family; Creighton recalled her as a kind mother-substitute to the children.

A self-made man, Robert Creighton continually expounded the virtues of hard work. Mandell's younger brother James joined his father's business, was twice elected mayor of Carlisle, and later became a director of the North British Railway. Polly recalled her childhood as "horridly unhappy". Her formal schooling was limited, but she devoted her adult life to promoting the education of children, and in 1927 became the first woman granted the freedom of the city of Carlisle. The family living quarters, above the shop, were spacious but spartan, with little decoration and few books. Robert was short-tempered and family life could be fraught. There was a strong sense of duty in the household but affection was rarely expressed openly.

Creighton's education began in a nearby dame school. In 1852 he moved to the Carlisle Cathedral School. Under the influence of an inspirational headmaster, the Rev William Bell, he began to read voraciously and excel academically. In November 1857 he took the King's Scholarship examination for admission to Durham School located 70 miles (110 km) away. As his Carlisle teachers had not prepared him for translation of Latin verse, he left a portion of the exam unanswered and felt sure he had failed. The examiners assessed his overall performance as good and decided to accept him, offering him a scholarship. In February 1858 the 15-year-old Creighton left Carlisle to become a boarder at Durham.

== Durham School, 1858–1862 ==
Creighton, aged 15, the year he left Carlisle for Durham School

Durham School required its students to attend services in Durham Cathedral on Sundays and holy days. The medieval cathedral's high-church ceremony made a lasting impression on Creighton. It became a focus of his religious life and would later influence his choice of career. Durham's headmaster, Henry Holden, a classical scholar and an educational reformer, was soon taking an interest in the new student. With Holden's encouragement, Creighton began to win prizes in classical subjects, and also English and French. Other pupils came seeking his help in translating passages from their classical studies; they gave him the nickname "Homer" on account of his quickness at construing. During his last year at Durham, he was promoted to head boy of the school, a position that appealed to his strong wish to inspire people, especially younger boys. Although he aimed to do so by setting an example with his own morality, corporal punishment was then the norm in schools, and he did not hesitate to use it. In a solemn letter written to his successor as head boy he wrote of the punishment for drunkenness, beastliness, (Note: Defined in this context by the Oxford English Dictionary as "British slang. Esp. in British boarding schools for boys: sexual activity characterized as harmful, sinful, or unnatural; esp. homosexual sex".) bullying and stealing: "I strongly recommend giving a fellow a thrashing ... and remember, never thrash a fellow a little, always hard".

Creighton was severely short-sighted; he also had double vision, which forced him to read with one eye closed, until a London oculist prescribed glasses to correct the fault. As his poor sight inhibited his participation in sports he took with enthusiasm to walking. His tours of the countryside, often undertaken with companions, could cover more than twenty miles (32 km) a day and last several days. Walking gave him many opportunities to exercise his curiosity about the local botany and architecture. The habit was to remain with him for the rest of his life.

In the spring of 1862 Creighton applied unsuccessfully for a scholarship to Balliol College, Oxford. He applied next to Merton College, Oxford, for a classical postmastership. (Note: At Merton College a postmastership is the title given, from the 16th century, to a recipient of a benefaction instituted in 1380.) The application was successful and Creighton arrived in Oxford in October 1862. He continued to take a keen interest in Durham School, and once walked there from Oxford to hear speeches at a school function.

== Oxford undergraduate, 1862–1866 ==
Creighton's annual postmastership grant of £70 (equivalent to £7,359 in 2025) was enough to cover his tuition at Merton, but little more. For his other expenses he had to apply to his father, who treated him quite generously. Creighton lived economically in college attic rooms for most of his time at Merton. In his last year he moved out of college to share rooms in the High with George Saintsbury, the future author and critic of English and French literature, and wine connoisseur, with whom he developed a shared liking for absinthe.

Creighton in the group "The Quadrilateral", at Merton College, Oxford, 1864. From left to right: R. T. Raikes, Creighton, C. T. Boyd, and W. H. Foster

Merton was a small college, which Creighton later described as "a very cosmopolitan place, made up of all sorts of men, with all sorts of tastes. There were rich men, poor men, reading men, idle men, all meeting on terms of mutual respect and with perfect frankness". Merton was much favoured by undergraduates from public school backgrounds who had more inclination to sports than to serious study. Creighton was not one such, and his poor eyesight prevented him from playing cricket and football, but he was able to join the college rowing team. Walking continued to be his principal physical recreation. He recalled, "I used to take a train and go somewhere, and walk through the villages, see the churches, study the architecture, and speculate on the conditions of life which must have been the outcome of these surroundings".

Creighton read voraciously and widely. Among his Merton friends he was dubbed "The Professor", or "P". The writers and poets of whose works he became fond included Carlyle, Browning, Tennyson and Swinburne. He was becoming politically aware, embracing a moderate liberalism. He joined the Oxford Union, and although he seldom spoke in debates there he was elected Union president in 1867. He especially honed his skills in informal conversations, conducted anywhere and everywhere, about topics great and small, rising above what Gladstone later dubbed "Oxford's agony"—the habit of overestimating the importance of Oxford's everyday disputes.

In his second year, Creighton and three other students became inseparable, both during academic terms and vacations, forming a group called "The Quadrilateral". The group friendship was intense, like many such in that time. Although Creighton had a large circle of male friends, he did not form any close friendships with women during this time. In his final term, he wrote to a friend, "ladies in general are very unsatisfactory mental food: they seem to have no particular thoughts or ideas". About Creighton's religious practice during this time, the historian James Kirby notes that he "attended daily communion, observed fasts, and took an interest in liturgy, becoming, as his biographer—his wife Louise—later said, 'a decided High Churchman'".

Academically, Creighton's goal was an honours degree in literae humaniores, the study of Greek and Roman classical literature, philosophy, and ancient history. In the final examinations, in the spring of his fourth year, he received first-class honours. He was drawn from classical to medieval history by a lecture by W. W. Shirley, the Regius Professor of Ecclesiastical History; the works of William Morris, John Ruskin, and Dante Gabriel Rossetti further enhanced this interest. Unlike historians of a generation earlier, such as William Stubbs and E. A. Freeman, students could now gain a supplementary degree in law and history. After six months' study Creighton took the examinations in that school in Autumn 1866. He had not allowed himself enough time to read all the relevant literature and achieved only a second class degree. His first in literae humaniores took precedence and the classics professor Benjamin Jowett suggested that Creighton apply for a teaching fellowship at Balliol. In the event he did not need to: his own college, Merton, elected him as a probationary fellow in December 1866.

== Teaching and marriage, 1867–1874 ==
Creighton as a Merton College tutorial fellow in 1870, a year before he met his future wife, Louise

At Merton, Creighton became a tutor in Modern History, which Kirby describes as "a relatively new subject which few were then prepared to teach". During the second half of the 19th century, many academic reforms were instituted at Oxford, beginning with the Oxford University Act 1854. By the 1860s the reforms had trickled down the colleges. Among the changes were the new responsibilities given to college tutors, whose teaching duties had previously consisted entirely of giving personalised instruction in their rooms to undergraduates. They were now tasked with the preparation of students for the university's examinations, previously the responsibility of university-wide instructors such as professors. As the tutors were chosen from distinguished recent graduates, the new instructional staff were more youthful than the old.

At this time there was discontent among the Merton students at what was seen as a lack of leadership in the teaching faculty. Many fellows, both resident and non-resident, had become distant presences. Creighton was popular with undergraduates and was looked upon as someone who would exercise the necessary leadership. According to his biographer James Covert he did so by appealing both to the students' reasoning and to their good sense, and by simultaneously immersing himself among them. He was given more responsibilities, which brought promotions and salary increases. After four years of teaching, his salary had more than doubled. With the college's approval he joined forces with another Merton tutor, William Esson, to open collegiate lectures to students of other colleges. Soon, the Association of Tutors was born, as well as an Oxford-wide series of lectures that any student could attend. The lectures were to influence his choice of future research. He wrote later:

We worked out among us a scheme of lectures covering the whole field (of history), and were the pioneers of the "Intercollegiate Lectures" which now prevail at both universities. The needs of this scheme threw upon me the ecclesiastical, and especially papal history, which no one else took.

Religious beliefs were also undergoing an upheaval. Many Victorian intellectuals, who had been raised in Christian households, had, in adult life, begun to experience religious doubt and were moving in a secular direction. Creighton, in contrast, was gradually consolidating his religious beliefs. Although his high-church views had moderated, he was to remain devoted to the doctrines of the real presence and apostolic succession throughout his life, although he had little sympathy for ritualism. He never had any crisis of confidence. He had no interest in the new natural sciences and was not moved to read Darwin, regarding his writings as too speculative. Creighton's friend Henry Scott Holland wrote of him, "At the close of the sixties it seemed to us at Oxford almost incredible that a young don of any intellectual reputation for modernity should be on the Christian side". After some speculation by friends about whether Creighton would commit to taking holy orders, he did so, being ordained deacon by John Mackarness, the Bishop of Oxford in 1870. He preached his first sermon in April 1871.

Creighton spent many vacations in Europe. He fell in love with Italy, its scenery, its culture, and its people. This led to a fascination with Renaissance Italy, which became his scholarly interest. He was an admirer of Walter Pater and the aesthetic movement. His rooms in Oxford were decorated with William Morris wallpaper and blue and white pottery. The furnishings brought admiration from friends and requests to view them from acquaintances. Creighton was now leading a life that was far removed from that of his frugal student days. According to Kirby:

The aestheticism of 1860s Oxford was also influential on his historical career, leading him towards quattrocento Italy. His decision in 1877 to devote himself to a History of the Papacy, spanning the period from the Great Schism to the Reformation, was thus a drawing together of these Italian subjects with the medieval and ecclesiastical interests which he had developed as an undergraduate.

=== Marriage ===
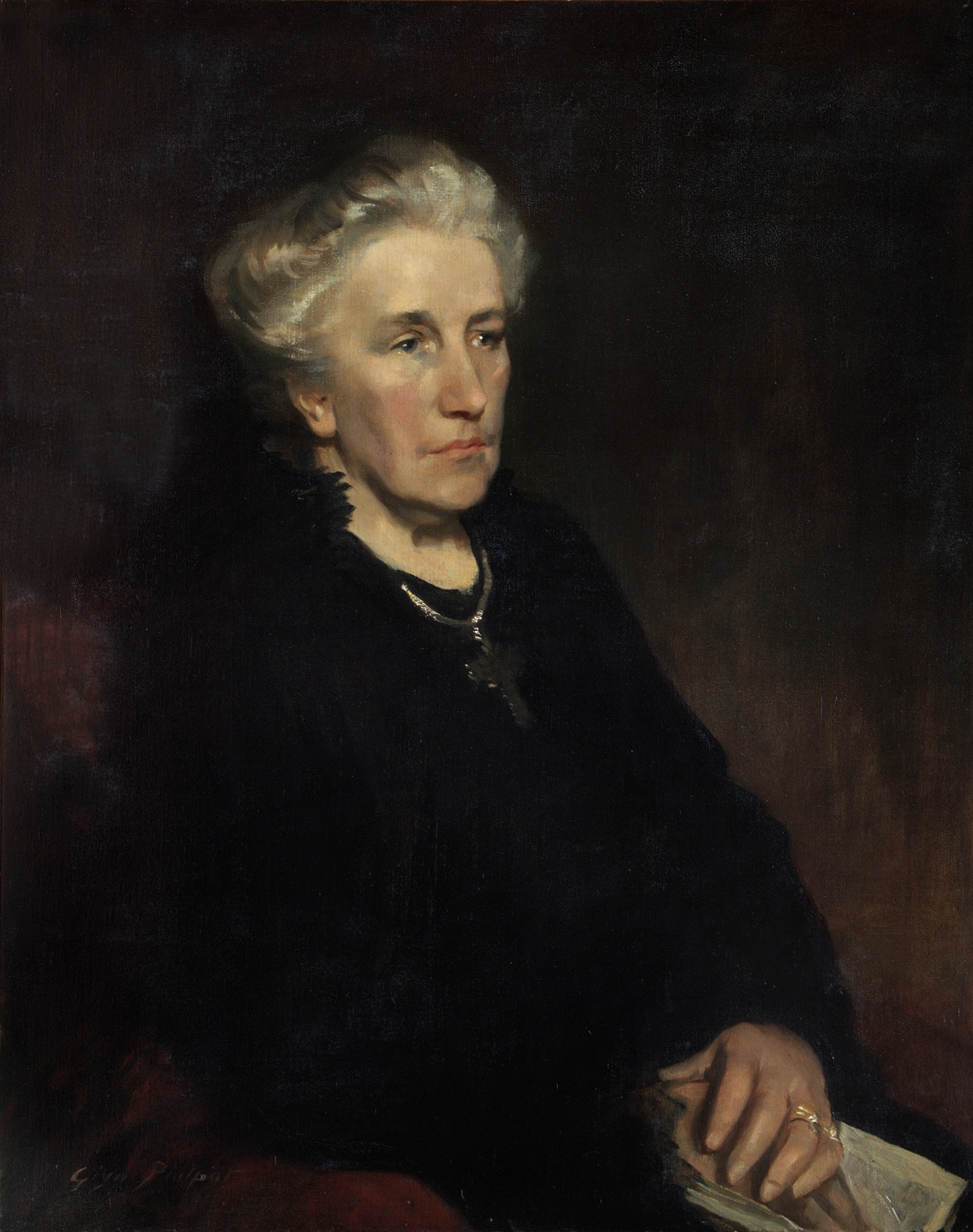
Louise Creighton by Glyn Philpot

After his return from a holiday in mainland Europe in early 1871 Creighton attended a lecture by the art critic John Ruskin at the Sheldonian Theatre. After the lecture, he noticed a friend, the future author Humphry Ward, talking to an unfamiliar young woman who was wearing a yellow scarf. Yellow was Creighton's favourite colour; the scarf aroused his interest enough for him to ask Ward about the woman, whose name was Louise von Glehn. She was the youngest daughter of a London merchant, Robert von Glehn, a naturalised British citizen who was originally from Reval in the Russian Governorate of Estonia. Soon Ward was inviting Creighton and von Glehn to a Valentine's Day lunch hosted in his rooms in Brasenose College.

In a few weeks von Glehn was won over by Creighton's charm, and before she left Oxford at the end of the month, the two were unofficially engaged. Their further courtship involved visiting the National Gallery and Victoria and Albert Museum, and examining the early Italian engravings in the print room of the British Museum. Creighton undertook to teach his fiancée Italian; she helped him improve his German. They had agreed to marry the following winter, but as Christmas approached, it was still not certain whether Merton would waive its requirement of celibacy for its teaching fellows. On Christmas Eve the college passed a special statute enabling four fellows, including Creighton, to hold office after marrying. Von Glehn and Creighton were married on 8 January 1872 in her home town of Sydenham, Kent. They spent a week honeymooning in Paris before returning to Oxford for Creighton's new teaching term.

Like many Victorian scholars, Creighton assumed that his wife would be an accessory in his academic pursuits and that he would be the senior partner in their intellectual relationship. During their courtship, he had written to her:

The nuisance of married life [is that] strive as I may or as you may, still the practical side of life must be much more prominent to me than to you. I shall have a number of things to do; whereas your sphere will be all within my reach and knowledge, mine on the other hand will not be in your reach entirely.

In the summer of 1873 the couple took their first trip together to Italy. It was during this trip that Creighton made firm his intention to study the Renaissance popes for his life's research. During these years there were additions to the family: a daughter was born to the couple in the autumn of 1872, and another in the summer of 1874. With a growing family and a clear research plan, Creighton began to doubt the long-term viability of his Merton tutorial fellowship. He wanted to give more time to writing history than his college duties allowed. He was ordained priest in 1873, and the following year an opportunity arose of a rural living in a remote parish in coastal Northumberland to which Merton held the right of appointment. Creighton later said:

Then came the crisis of my life, when quite unexpectedly a country living was offered to me. I was thirty-two at the time, and I had to decide whether I would stay at Oxford, where I was very happy indeed, or go away from the University. I felt, however, it was my duty to be a parish priest. ... Another motive for my accepting the living was that I had then mapped out in my head the history of the Papacy which I wanted to write. I came to the conclusion that I should have more chance of writing it in the quiet seclusion of a country vicarage than I could at Oxford.

Although varying advice was offered by Louise, by Creighton's married colleagues, by his unmarried colleagues, and even by his students, his mind was made up. When, in late 1874, the college formally offered him the position of vicar of the parish of Embleton, Creighton accepted and the family moved there in December.

== Vicar of Embleton, 1875–1884 ==
The Embleton vicarage with its pele tower

The village of Embleton lies close to the North Sea in Northumberland approximately midway between Edinburgh and Newcastle upon Tyne. The vicarage—then owned by Merton College and consisting of a fortified pele tower built in the 14th century along with adjoining later additions—was a large establishment with many rooms for Creighton's growing family, their guests, and servants. The parish consisted of a handful of villages and approximately 1700 inhabitants, among whom were farmers, whinstone quarrymen, herring and haddock fishermen, women workers in fish curing yards, and railwaymen.

Although the Creightons missed Oxford society and its stimulations they gradually adapted to their new surroundings. With the help of a curate paid from his own funds, Creighton established a routine that enabled him to both carry out pastoral duty and write history. Each weekday morning, he spent four hours reading in the vicarage library.

In the afternoons, Mandell and, whenever possible, Louise, visited the homes of their parishioners, listening to them, giving advice, offering prayers, conducting services for the housebound, and, on occasion, handing out home-made medical remedies. They found their parishioners to be reserved, proud, and independent, but could not help seeing them as lacking in morals.

Although Creighton was not a teetotaller—he made a clear distinction between the suppression of drunkenness and the suppression of drink—he founded a local chapter of the Church of England Temperance Society, thereby displeasing some locals. (Note: Louise Creighton was much amused, after giving a talk to working-class mothers, to overhear one saying to another, "Yes, 'twas all very fine; she's a nice lady and a first-class speaker. But I should like to ask her this: What does she do when old Creighton comes home drunk?") Louise organised meetings of the Mothers' Union as well as The Girls' Friendly Society, which aimed to empower girls, encouraging them, for example, to stay in school until the age of fourteen.

(A good teacher) brings knowledge and his pupil into a vital relationship; and the object of teaching is to establish that relationship on an intelligible basis. This can only be done ... by appealing to two qualities which are at the bottom of all knowledge, curiosity and observation. They are born with us, every child naturally develops them, and it is the duty of the teacher to direct them to proper ends

— From Mandell Creighton's Thoughts on Education: Speeches and Sermons
p. 77 (1902)

Creighton's own family was growing: four more children were born during the Embleton years, and all were home schooled, mostly by Louise. Creighton, who took great interest in the parish schools, served as examiner for other schools in the region, and began to formulate some ideas on the education of children. He was elected to local government bodies such as the Board of Guardians, which administered the poor laws in the region, and to the local sanitary authority. In 1879 he accepted his first administrative position in the Church of England: he was appointed rural dean of the Alnwick area of the diocese, responsible—in addition to his parochial duties at Embleton—for supervising the clergy in neighbouring parishes. Later, he was appointed examining chaplain for the Bishop of Newcastle, Ernest Roland Wilberforce, and tasked with assessing candidates for holy orders.

Between the two of them, the Creightons wrote fifteen books during their ten years in Embleton. They both wrote history books for young people, Louise wrote an unsuccessful novel, and Mandell wrote the first two volumes of his magnum opus, The History of the Papacy in the Period of Reformation. The Papacy volumes, published in 1882, cover the period leading up the Reformation, and end twenty years before the birth of Luther. They were well received and were commended for their even-handed approach. The historian Lord Acton, who reviewed them in The Academy and who was aware that they were written over a few years in a northern vicarage far from the centres of scholarship, wrote:

The history of increasing depravity and declining faith, of reforms earnestly demanded, feebly attempted, and deferred too long, is told by Mr Creighton with a fullness of accuracy unusual in works which are the occupation of a lifetime.

Creighton also wrote dozens of book reviews and scholarly articles. Among them were his first forays into the role of the Church of England in the life of the nation. Throughout the 19th century, the Church had suffered erosion of membership. In the mid-century, many scholars such as the educator Thomas Arnold had asserted the identity of the Church and the nation; as the century entered its last two decades, Creighton was among a small minority continuing to do the same.

In 1884 Creighton was invited to apply for the newly created professorship of ecclesiastical history, the Dixie chair, at the University of Cambridge and a concurrent fellowship at Emmanuel College. His application was successful, and on 9 November 1884 Creighton preached his last sermon at Embleton church. Later, he said, "At Embleton I spent ten years, and I have no hesitation in saying that they were the ten happiest years of my life. There I got to know people, and to know English people: two things ... which one does not learn at a University". Louise Creighton recalled that his parishioners found it difficult to express their feelings openly; she recorded one woman as saying, "Well, if you ain't done no good, you've done no harm", which coming from a Northumbrian he took as high praise. After his death he was commemorated in Embleton by the building of the Creighton Memorial Hall. Built with the financial support of Sir Edward Grey and others, it was declared open by Louise Creighton in October 1903.

== Cambridge professor, 1884–1891 ==
I turn to the past to learn its story without any preconceived opinion what that story may be. I do not assume that one period or one line of study is more instructive than another, but I am ready to recognise the real identity of man's aspiration at all times. Some episodes in history are regarded as profoundly modern; others are dismissed contemptuously as concerned with trifles. In some ages there are great heroes, in others the actors are sunk in indolence and sloth. For my own part I do not recognise this great distinction

— From, "The Teaching of Ecclesiastical History", Inaugural lecture, Dixie Chair of Ecclesiastical History, University of Cambridge, 23 January 1885.

The Creightons arrived in Cambridge in late November 1884 and were deluged with invitations to social engagements. Interaction with academic society after ten years led to new friendships, especially for Louise. One such new acquaintance, Beatrice Webb, who became Louise's firm lifelong friend, wrote of her, "She has, I think, a warmer heart and a larger mind than her husband's". Creighton had already corresponded with Acton and now met him in person, as he did other Cambridge notables, such as Robertson Smith, the Hebrew and Arabic scholar, and Alfred Marshall, the economist.

Creighton, aged 38, signing, "Yours very sincerely, M. Creighton"

Creighton with three of his daughters (from left to right), Lucia, Beatrice, and Mary, in 1888. The Creightons' fourth daughter and seventh child, Gemma, born the previous year, is not shown.

From his arrival in Cambridge, colleagues turned to Creighton for his advice. He contributed to changes in the historical tripos and its examination, providing candidates with more choice and more open-ended questions. Crowder writes, "As a historian he was concerned with what the past had to tell about the character of the actors and their times rather than with the accumulation of information".

Creighton lectured twice a week at the university, preparing extensively, but lecturing without notes. He also preached in the Emmanuel College chapel. A colleague said of his preaching style, "He did not care for eloquence, indeed he despised it; what he aimed at was instruction, and for this he always looked more to principles than facts". He lectured more informally to undergraduates at Emmanuel College once a week. He supported Cambridge's two new women's colleges, Girton (founded 1869) and Newnham (1871), and taught informal weekly classes at Newnham. Two students from those classes, Mary Bateson and Alice Gardner, later became professional historians; both were mentored by Creighton.

Creighton was given to undertaking any work he was asked to do. In 1885 he accepted two appointments that added substantially to his workload. A long-planned journal of history, The English Historical Review was launched with Creighton as its editor, and he became a residentiary canon of Worcester Cathedral. Crowder writes that Creighton had no illusions about the work editing the journal would entail: "he accepted out of duty, before any editorial policy had been framed, quite apart from his goal of promoting interest in the discipline and improving research".

The canonry at Worcester required the holder to be in residence there for a total of three months every year. Creighton fitted this into his academic schedule: he and his household lived in the cathedral close there during university vacations. During the weeks of his residence he preached in the cathedral every Sunday evening to large congregations. He contributed to the cathedral's intellectual and liturgical life, giving lectures and bringing visiting scholars to lecture to the clergy of the diocese.

Creighton's experiences at Worcester led him to consider how a relationship of competition between a cathedral and the parish churches of the diocese could be turned into one of cooperation, a subject on which he would write scholarly articles. He did not overlook the grim side of city life. He joined the Worcester Diocesan Penitentiary Association and was moved by the plight of prison inmates. In a sermon at the Sanitary Congress of Worcester in 1889 he spoke about the effect of harsh physical life on the moral life:

[T]he unwholesome air of the factory, the crowded workshop, the ill-ventilated room, all those things rob the body of its vigour, how they must also act upon the soul! ... uncleanliness, hatred, variance, drunkenness, revelling. Do not these things, think you, come largely from, and are they not greatly affected by, the physical conditions under which life is lived?

Emmanuel College was the alma mater of the Rev John Harvard, after whom Harvard College in the US is named. In November 1886, the college marked its 250th anniversary in November 1886 and Creighton, accompanied by Louise, attended the celebrations, representing Emmanuel. During the extended visit, they met prominent American men of letters, including the historian of the American West, Francis Parkman; the future supreme court justice, Oliver Wendell Holmes Jr.; and the poet and critic James Russell Lowell. Creighton received an honorary Harvard doctorate.

In February 1887 volumes III and IV of Creighton's History of the Papacy were published by Longmans. These volumes narrowed the focus to specific popes, chiefly, Sixtus IV, Alexander VI and Julius II, and covered a period of a little over half a century, bringing the narrative to 1518 and the start of the Reformation. (Note: "Review". Carlisle Patriot; Oxford World Encyclopaedia, 2014 (for the date of the start of the Reformation).) In his approach of maintaining historiographical balance and considering individuals as products of their historical eras, Creighton did not single out anyone for special condemnation, even the Borgia pope, Alexander VI, whose "exceptional infamy", Creighton felt, was "largely due to the fact that he did not add hypocrisy to his other vices".

Creighton invited Acton to review the two volumes for The English Historical Review. Acton had by this time developed what the historian J. P. Kenyon has called "his hatred of the papacy, [which], inflamed by his historical studies, knew no bounds". Acton's review was largely hostile, implying that Creighton's methods were not those of a "scrupulous and self-respecting writer", and commenting adversely about "the economy of evidence, and the severity with which the raw material is repressed". In the following weeks there were contentious exchanges between the two men, polarising eventually into their two views of history, Acton's normative approach versus Creighton's more relativist one. (Note: It was in one of these exchanges that Acton penned three sentences of which the second was to become a much quoted (and misquoted) epigram. "Historical responsibility has to make up for the want of legal responsibility. Power tends to corrupt, and absolute power corrupts absolutely. Great men are almost always bad men, even when they exercise influence and not authority".) Acton's strictures led Creighton to reconsider his own position and become slightly more judgmental. In an 1895 paper he would write that the papacy, "which had been established for the promotion of morality" had in fact "provided the means for the utmost immorality".

== Bishop of Peterborough, 1891–1896 ==
Creighton in the garden of the bishop's palace at Peterborough, 1893

In December 1890 Creighton received a letter from Lord Salisbury, the Prime Minister, asking whether he would be willing to exchange the canonry of Worcester for the canonry of Windsor, which had become vacant. After some hesitation, Creighton accepted, but before he could take up the new appointment it was forestalled by another letter from Salisbury, in February. This offered appointment as Bishop of Peterborough, an office that had become available upon the translation of its incumbent William Connor Magee to York. Creighton was chosen partly because his love for ritual had created an impression among others that he had a high-church outlook. The Peterborough diocese had many high churchmen, and it was felt that Creighton would be a good fit. In fact, Creighton was quite broad church in terms of doctrine and belief (as opposed to his taste for vestments and high-church trappings); his moderate views would later make him popular with Queen Victoria.

The tolerant man has decided opinions, but recognises the process by which he reaches them, and keeps before himself the truth that they can only be profitably spread by repeating in the case of others a similar process to that through which he passed himself. He always keeps in view the hope of spreading his own opinions, but he endeavours to do so by producing conviction. He is virtuous, not because he puts his own opinions out of sight, nor because he thinks that other opinions are as good as his own, but because his opinions are so real to him that he would not anyone else hold them with less reality

— From, Mandell Creighton, Persecution and Tolerance, Hulsean Lectures, University of Cambridge, Winter 1893–94

In Creighton's mind, the Peterborough appointment, which he felt duty-bound to accept, meant the effective end of his academic life. The Creightons, particularly Louise, were evidently depressed at the prospect of leaving Cambridge. In a letter to an old college friend, Creighton wrote, "No man could have less desire than I for the office of bishop. Nothing save the cowardliness of shirking from responsibility and the dread of selfishness led me to submit".

A few weeks before Creighton's consecration as bishop at Westminster Abbey in late April 1891, he fell ill with muscular rheumatism. Soon after his enthronement at Peterborough Cathedral in mid-May 1891 he was taken ill again, this time with influenza. Each time, the recovery was prolonged. The Peterborough diocese, then comprising 676 parishes and including Leicester and Northampton, offered a vast ecclesiastical challenge. Creighton met it in the manner he had employed in Embleton: he proceeded to visit every corner. Travelling by train to distant parishes, staying overnight with the parish priests, and conducting services in their churches, Creighton spent very little time at home with his family during the first year. His immersion among the clergy, treatment of them as equals, and dispatch in attending to their concerns, gradually increased his popularity. The experience also helped him to work out his doctrinal stance. Although he was personally liberal, he came firmly to believe that to be English was to be Anglican, and to regard dissenters as having lost their way and Roman Catholics as disloyal.

Creighton also became determined to better understand the working classes of his diocese. The Leicester boot-and-shoe-trade strike of 1895, which began in March as a lock-out of 120,000 workers by employers, gave him just such an opportunity. Creighton wrote an open letter to his clergy, impressed them with the gravity of the situation, and urged them to work impartially to facilitate communication between the opposing sides. According to Covert, "Creighton's tactic was to serve as conduit for all bargaining parties, sharing information and feelings derived from his local clergy, who, being on the spot, possessed insights and sympathies that needed to be known and expressed". By late April, a compromise was reached for which Creighton reaped much praise as well as a growing reputation as a peacemaker.

A year earlier, in 1894, the fifth and last volume of Creighton's History of Papacy in the Period of Reformation was published by Longman. The book was subtitled The German Revolt, 1517–1527 and covered the history up to the Sack of Rome in 1527. Creighton had found little time to devote to its writing, and critics generally expressed disappointment in the outcome. Although he had originally planned to continue the history up to the final session of the Council of Trent in 1563, Creighton did not now feel up to the task. As the volumes did not cover the period claimed in their title, the publisher, in 1897, brought out a second edition titled, A History of the Papacy from the Great Schism to the Sack of Rome, 1378–1527 reflecting the reduced scope. Creighton, nonetheless, remained a popular lecturer. During his Peterborough years, he gave many lectures, most published later in book form, their titles reflecting his diverse intellectual interests. Among his addresses were the Hulsean Lectures at Cambridge in the winter of 1893–94 on "Persecution and Tolerance", the 1895 Rede Lecture at Cambridge on "The Early Renaissance in England", the 1896 Romanes Lecture at Oxford on "The English National Character", and his 1896 address at Westminster Abbey on "Saint Edward the Confessor".

In June 1896 Creighton represented the Church of England at the coronation of Czar Nicholas II in Moscow, deputising for the Archbishop of Canterbury, Edward White Benson, who was ill, as was Randall Davidson, the Bishop of Winchester, who as Prelate of the Order of the Garter would have been the official stand-in. (Note: Creighton reported that in addition to the Church of England other denominations were represented by "two Roman Catholic prelates, two Lutheran superintendents [and] two Armenian bishops". Creighton was the only non-Russian invited to the state banquet after the coronation.) A lover of pageantry, Creighton wore a bishop's cope and mitre of white and gold, rather than the plainer episcopal attire more familiar in England at the time. On his return he wrote a twenty-page account of the coronation for the Cornhill Magazine, which gained the attention of Queen Victoria, who sent Creighton a letter requesting several copies for the royal family.

== Bishop of London, 1897–1901 ==
=== Appointment ===
In October 1896 Archbishop Benson died. Three possible successors were considered: Frederick Temple (Bishop of London), Davidson and Creighton. Queen Victoria wanted Davidson to be offered the archbishopric; the Archbishop of York (William Maclagan) and the Prince of Wales favoured Creighton, but the Prime Minister, Lord Salisbury, with whom the decision effectively rested, preferred to move Temple to Canterbury and replace him in London with Creighton. The Times commented, "Considerable doubt has been felt as to the fitness of the appointment to the Archbishopric of Canterbury of a man as advanced in life as Dr Temple", (Note: Temple turned 75 in 1896.) but expressed great confidence in Creighton. He was not then, any more than he had ever been, eager for ecclesiastical advancement, which he felt had been thrust upon him and disrupted his academic career. Nonetheless he considered it his duty to undertake what was asked of him, though hoping for a return to scholarly endeavours at the end.

Creighton was enthroned as Bishop of London on 30 January 1897. At first his subordinate clergy were unsure about him. According to one commentator:

The London clergy ... find Dr Creighton something of a puzzle. The flavour of cynicism which still clings to him perplexes them; his pungent humour is not always congenial to the reverend mind; and his appalling outspokenness, upon occasion, fairly frightens them, as when he said that a bishop's duty was not to preach at Harvest Festivals or to "bless hassocks", but to govern his diocese.

The same (anonymous) commentator said that Creighton's liking for vestments should not lead people to suppose he was sympathetic to ritualism or would tolerate any practices not authorised by the Book of Common Prayer.

I do not wish to command so much as to persuade. I wish to induce people to see themselves as others see them, to regard what they are doing in reference to its far-off effects on the consciences of others, to cultivate a truer sense of proportion of things, to deal more with ideas than with the clothing of ideas; to pay more attention to the reason of a thing than to its antiquity; to remember that the chief danger that besets those who are pursuing a high object is to confuse means with ends; to examine themselves very fully, lest they confuse Christian zeal with the desire to have their own way

— Mandell Creighton, Bishop of London, at the Diocesan Conference, April 1899.

=== Educational reform ===
Mandell Creighton, Bishop of London, full-length portrait in robes

One of Creighton's first efforts after becoming Bishop of London was to support the passage of the Voluntary School Bill of 1897. Almost thirty years earlier, the Elementary Education Act 1870 had established non-denominational elementary schools, also called board schools, which were funded by local taxes. Religious schools, also called "voluntary schools" had not received this support. The bill asked for extension of taxpayer support to the voluntary schools. In March 1897 Creighton addressed the House of Lords in support of the bill, which was eventually passed by both Houses of Parliament. Creighton felt strongly that all religious instruction should be denominational. In a letter to the London district school boards, he wrote, "We only ask that the wishes of the parents be consulted about [religious] education of their children, and that every child in England should receive instruction in the religious beliefs of the denomination to which his parents belong".

=== High-v-low church controversies ===
By 1898 Creighton was increasingly occupied with a debate over ritual practice in the Diocese of London, and, more generally, in the Church of England. On his arrival in London, he had discovered that low-church clergy in his diocese were taking exception to the ritual practices of some high churchmen, practices thought by some to show Roman Catholic influence. The controversy had begun in the wake of the Oxford Movement of the 1830s and later, which had created an Anglo-Catholic revival within the Church. An evangelical agitator, John Kensit, had protested that Creighton himself had on occasion worn a cope and mitre. Kensit called for Creighton to take a firmer public stance against high-church rituals, such as the use of candles and incense. Although Creighton seemed to subscribe to a broad branch theory—that the real Catholic Church was a collection of national churches which included the Church of England, the Church of Rome and the Eastern Orthodox Church—he was firm about asserting Anglican doctrine—that liturgical practice, beyond that involving what he termed "permissible liberty", must conform to that in the Book of Common Prayer. In a circular letter to his clergy, he wrote:

It is absolutely necessary that nothing should be done which affects the due performance of the services of the Church as laid down in the Book of Common Prayer, and that any additional services which are used should conform entirely to the spirit and intention of the Prayer Book.

This was not enough to satisfy Kensit and his more vocal evangelical supporters, who threatened to create public disruption. Eventually the archbishops of Canterbury and York held a hearing in Lambeth Palace, and in August 1899 ruled against the use of candles and incense, a seeming victory for the low-church forces. The wider doctrinal conflict, though, was to continue beyond both the Victorian and Edwardian eras. (Note: Creighton's immediate successor as Bishop of London, Arthur Winnington-Ingram, who served until 1939, struggled throughout his tenure to reconcile the two wings of the Church in his diocese. His biographer Jeremy Morris writes that he "faced particular difficulties over militant protestant hostility to ritualist clergy. His policy of tolerating most innovations in ritual, and yet prohibiting certain practices, failed to satisfy either extreme". His successor, William Wand, was accused by extreme evangelicals of "Popish practice" and was subject to protests so strident that the police had to be summoned.)

=== Workload, final days and death ===
Throughout this time, Creighton conducted the endless business that came with his large diocese. In one year, he was recorded to have given 294 formal sermons and addresses. He made trips to Windsor Castle and Sandringham to conduct services for Queen Victoria. In 1897 he organised a special service of thanksgiving outside St Paul's Cathedral in commemoration of her Diamond Jubilee. His prominent office, moreover, brought other responsibilities. He was appointed to the Privy Council; he became a trustee of the British Museum, the National Portrait Gallery and many other organisations, and succeeded Frederic Leighton as president of the committee commissioning the Survey of London which documented the capital's principal buildings and public art.

Creighton's health became a cause for concern to his family and friends. Starting in 1898, he had begun to experience bouts of stomach pain. By 1899 these had increased in severity, and by the summer of 1900 his doctors were suspecting a stomach tumour. He was operated on twice in December of that year, but the surgeries were unsuccessful. In early January he experienced two severe stomach haemorrhages and his condition rapidly declined. He died on 14 January 1901, aged 57, in London.

On 17 January 1901, after a funeral in St Paul's Cathedral attended by archbishops, bishops and other clergy, politicians, academics, representatives of other churches and faiths, and numerous members of the general public, Archbishop Temple presided over the interment of Creighton's body in the crypt. It was the first time that a Bishop of London had been buried in Wren's St Paul's, which replaced Old St Paul's after the Great Fire of London in 1666. (Note: The last Bishop of London buried at (Old) St Paul's was John King in 1621. The bishops of London after King and before the replacement of Old St Paul's with Wren's building were George Montaigne, William Laud, William Juxon and Gilbert Sheldon, who were all buried elsewhere.)

== Character and personal life ==
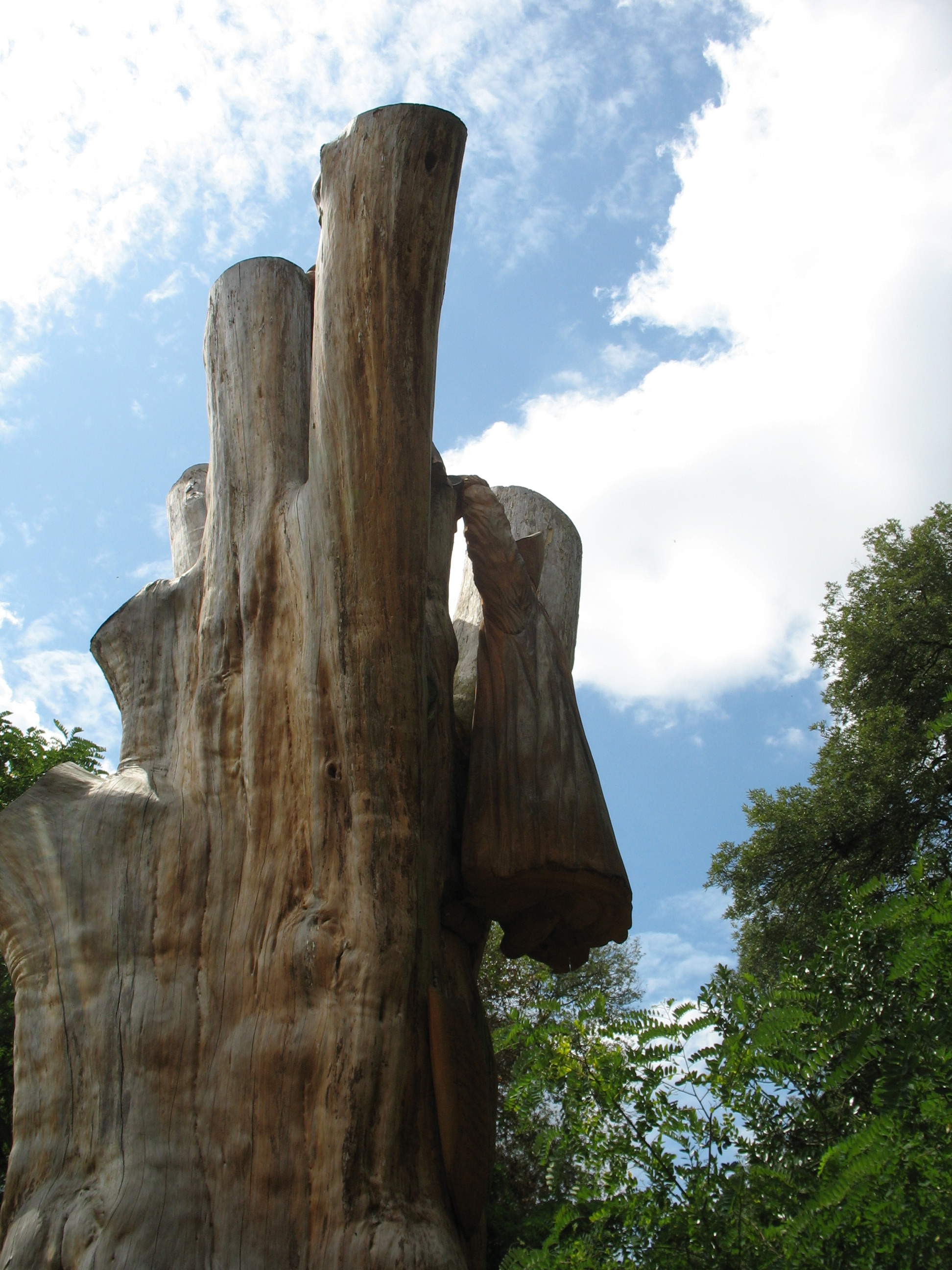
Wood sculpture by Andrew Frost in Fulham Palace gardens showing Creighton climbing up the "Bishops' Tree"

The philosopher Edward Caird, a fellow at Merton during Creighton's student days there, said of him, "Creighton possesses common sense in a degree which amounts to genius". Later, at Cambridge, some colleagues were perplexed by his personality. When teaching or transacting academic business, he displayed a shrewd, canny intelligence. But at social gatherings, much to the delight of the students present, he was continually outrageous and flippant. His relationship with Louise is not easily characterised. In the months after the Peterborough appointment, husband and wife would frequently quarrel, sometimes bitterly, as a niece would later recall. But the couple could also be surprisingly demonstrative for their times: during this same period, a nephew caught sight of Louise and her husband locked in passionate embrace. The Creightons had seven children, and he could be stern with them, on one occasion tying a daughter to a table leg as a punishment. (Note: A treatment familiar to Creighton from his own childhood.) Yet he could also romp around the house with them, engage in horseplay, and make up nonsensical stories—all of which, many years later, they would consider highlights of their childhood.

Throughout his life, Creighton went on long walks (his "rambles", as he liked to call them). When the children grew older, the family's outdoor pastime of choice became hockey. Many clergy visiting him at his London residence, Fulham Palace, found themselves unable to refuse Creighton's enthusiastic invitations to join in.

Although sparing with alcohol, Creighton was a lifelong chain smoker. An interviewer recalled seeing him rolling and smoking "cigarettes innumerable". When the author Samuel Butler received an invitation to visit the Creightons in Peterborough in 1894, he was dubious about accepting until his secretary noticed in the letter a flake of tobacco inadvertently left by Creighton.

Creighton loved pageantry, creating speculation that he had high-church views. However, when a high-church priest protested that incense was needed for curing souls, Creighton responded, "And you think that souls like herring cannot be cured without smoke?" His moderate views—equally opposed to radical evangelicals and conservative Anglo-Catholics—endeared him to Queen Victoria. His work ethic, on the other hand, was far from moderate. He seldom refused offers of additional responsibility, confessing more than once to both an abiding fatalism about being saddled with more responsibility and guilt about shirking it. His old friend Scott Holland, by then a canon of St Paul's, welcoming Creighton to the diocese of London in 1897, remarked, "I hope you will use up everybody except yourself. We want our Bishop to have his head above water—not to be loaded down by the tremendous grind".

== Legacy and reputation ==
Obituaries in contemporary newspapers and scholarly journals hailed Creighton as one of England's great historians and a prelate of remarkable integrity. The Quarterly Review remarked, "It is certainly rare to find so much intellectual force and so high a standard of conduct combined in one man".

Few men, I imagine, who become great started on their career with the intention of becoming so. The intention generally accompanies the unsuccessful. The secret of real greatness seems to be a happy knack of doing things as they come in your way; and they rarely present themselves in the form which careful preparation would enable you to deal with

— Mandell Creighton, "Heroes". Address given to the Social and Political Education League, 4 November 1898.

=== Historian ===
Today, Creighton is better known as a historian than as a cleric. His work is seen as part of his own era in British historiography. Many of the milestones of Creighton's academic life, such as founding of The English Historical Review in 1885, with himself as the first editor, are those of the era as well. According to the historian Philippa Levine:

The Review was the culmination of a series of related developments central to the asserting of the primacy of the professional historian. In 1884 a highly distinguished trio of men had all been rewarded with academic preferment: Mandell Creighton became the first Dixie Professor of Ecclesiastical History at the University of Cambridge, E. A. Freeman succeeded his friend Stubbs in the Regius Professorship of Modern History at Oxford and the legal historian Frederick Maitland became reader in English Law at Cambridge. The following year the reform of the Historical Tripos in Cambridge and the division of Oxford's arts faculty into the three areas of literae humaniores, oriental languages and modern history declared that history had finally won academic respect as an autonomous area of study.

Creighton is considered to be one of the first British historians with a distinctly European outlook. Of his magnum opus, History of the Papacy in the Period of the Reformation, R. J. W. Evans writes, "[It] constitutes one of the first great attempts to introduce the British to explicitly modern and European history".

Creighton and his peers left a heterogeneous legacy. On the one hand, Creighton was a painstakingly balanced scholar; even his critic Lord Acton described Creighton's strength as "sovereign impartiality". Creighton saw himself as someone interested in actions, in contrast to Acton, whom he considered to be interested in ideas. Although Creighton did not personally consider the popes to be guiltless (for example, amidst writing the third papacy volume, he wrote, in a letter to a friend, that working on the Borgias was like "spending one's day in a low police court") Creighton was emphatic that public men be judged for their public and not private actions. In a lecture on "Historical Ethics" he gave in the wake of his dispute with Acton, he said, "I like to stand upon clear grounds which can be proved and estimated. I do not like to wrap myself in the garb of outraged dignity because men in the past did things contrary to the principles which I think soundest in the present".

On the other hand, Creighton's historical outlook, as well as that of his historian peers, bore the cultural and social stamp of their position. According to the historians Robert Harrison, Aled Jones and Peter Lambert, "Their emphasis on the Englishness of Britain's key institutions, for instance, effectively excluded non-English ethnic groups from the 'chief part', as Creighton had put it, of history's subject".

In the words of the historian John Wolffe:

He brought both scholarly rigour and public accessibility to the emerging discipline of history, notably in his great but uncompleted work History of the Papacy, his studies of the impact of the Reformation in England, and his service as first editor of The English Historical Review from 1886 to 1891. Influenced by the German historical school, he adopted a clear, dispassionate, and erudite approach to controversial subjects.

=== Churchman ===
The emphasis on concreteness and reality would remain a feature of Creighton's episcopates. He saw the Church of England not as an abstract entity existing independently in space and time, but as rooted in England, its people, and their history. In the words of the historian Keith Robbins, "It was an unashamed acknowledgment on his part that the form, structure, ethos and doctrine of that church had been fashioned in the circumstances of English history". Similarly, Creighton saw the living church as an embodiment of the contemporary yearnings of the English people. He wrote, "The people need not agree about details, but the general trend of the Church must be regulated by their wishes. The Church cannot go too far from the main ideas of the people". Consequently, Creighton could imbue the church with Victorian self-assessments and aspirations: "The function of the Church of England was to be a church of free men. The Church of Rome was the church of decadent peoples: it lives only in the past, and has no future ... The Church of England has before it the conquest of the world".

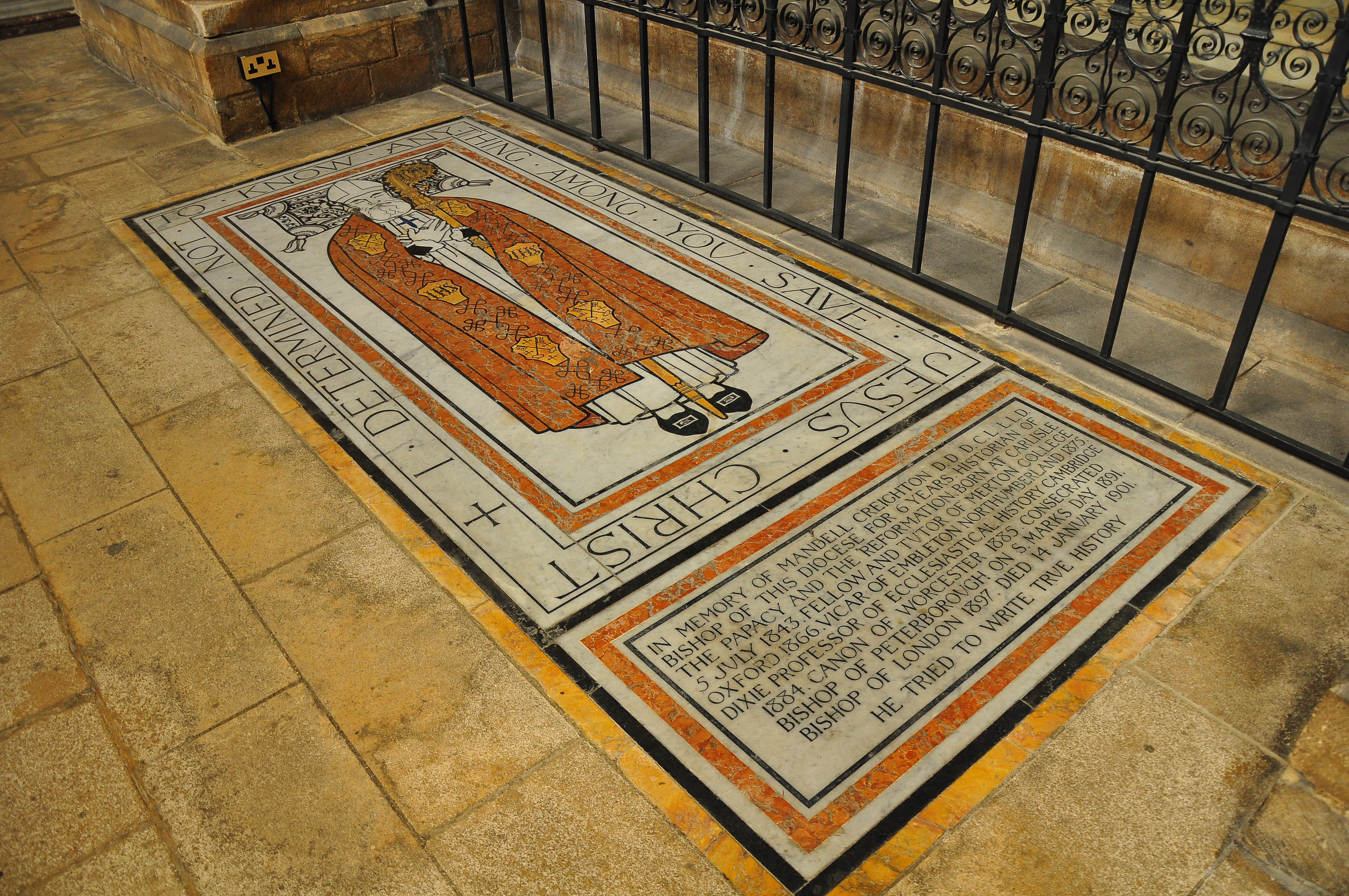
Memorial in Peterborough Cathedral

As a corollary of this outlook, Creighton was explicitly against the separation of church and state. In his way of thinking, church and state were two aspects of the nation as seen from two vantage points. Any attempt at legislating a separation would, in addition, have caused social disruptions in late-Victorian Britain: many higher clergy had ties of education and friendship with prominent public men.

In Wolffe's summary:

His episcopates were marked by statesmanship, scrupulous efficiency, and tact, especially in dealing with the conflicts over ritualism. They were also shaped by his profound commitment to the establishment of the Church of England, which he saw as the soul of the nation.

=== Honours and memorials ===
During his lifetime Creighton received honorary doctorates from these universities: Oxford, Cambridge, Harvard, and Glasgow, and Trinity College, Dublin. A few years after his death, the Creighton lecture was established at King's College, London. The lecture series celebrated its centenary in 2007.

Creighton was elected a member of the American Antiquarian Society in 1897. He was a corresponding member of the Massachusetts Historical Society and of the American Society of Church History, and a fellow of the Società romana di storia patria.

In 1907 Louise Creighton raised funds to found Bishop Creighton House, (Note: Since 2023 known as the Creighton Centre.) serving the area around Fulham and Hammersmith, tackling problems caused by social isolation and disadvantage.

There is a memorial to Creighton in Peterborough Cathedral just north of the sanctuary in the form of a substantial mosaic depicting his effigy, details of his life and the mottos "I determined not to know anything among you save Jesus Christ" and "He tried to write true history". The memorial to Creighton in St Paul's bears the same two inscriptions.

== Works by Creighton ==
In his Who's Who article Creighton chose to list fifteen of his books (marked † below). Those, and others of his books, are:

- A Primer History of Rome, 1875 †
- The Life of Simon de Montfort, 1876 †
- The Age of Elizabeth, 1876 †
- The Tudors and the Reformation, 1876 †
- History of England, 1879
- A History of the Papacy during the Period of the Reformation (5 volumes), 1882–1894: †
  - Volume I, The Great Schism—The Council of Constance, 1378–1418, 1882
  - Volume II, The Council of Basel—The Papal Restoration, 1418–1464, 1882
  - Volume III, The Italian Princes, 1464–1518, 1887
  - Volume IV, The Italian Princes, 1464–1518 (continued), 1887
  - Volume V, The German Revolt, 1517–1527, 1894
- Cardinal Wolsey, 1888 †
- History of Carlisle, 1889 †
- A Charge, 1894
- Persecution and Tolerance, 1894 †
- The Early Renaissance in England, 1895 †
- Queen Elizabeth, 1896
- The Heritage of the Spirit, and Other Sermons, 1896
- The English National Character, 1896 †
- Church and State, 1897.
- The Story of Some English Shires, 1897 †
- Lessons from the Cross, 1898
- The Position of the Church of England, 1899
- The Church and the Nation, 1900

After his death many of Creighton's lectures, speeches and sermons were collected and published in book form:

- Historical Essays and Reviews, 1902
- Thoughts on Education: Speeches and Sermons, 1902
- Historical Lectures and Addresses, 1903
- University and Other Sermons, 1903
- Persecution and Tolerance: The Hulsean Lectures Preached Before the University of Cambridge in 1893–94

In addition, Creighton contributed reviews and articles to many publications, including nine biographical studies in the early volumes of the Dictionary of National Biography beginning with Saint Aidan and Pope Adrian IV and ending with Lady Mary Keyes. Two of his articles remain, with later revisions, in the Oxford Dictionary of National Biography (2024)—on Charles Baring and John Hodgson.

== Notes ==
Church of England titles
Preceded by William Connor Magee	Bishop of Peterborough; 1891–1897	Succeeded by Edward Glyn
Preceded by Frederick Temple	Bishop of London; 1897–1901	Succeeded by Arthur Winnington-Ingram
