= Clarence Walworth Alvord =

American history professor

- Born: May 21, 1868; Greenfield, Massachusetts, U.S.
- Died: January 24, 1928 (aged 59); Diano Marina, Liguria, Italy
- Occupation: History professor
- Awards: Loubat Prize (1918)

Clarence Walworth Alvord (May 21, 1868 in Greenfield, Massachusetts – January 24, 1928) was an American historian who was professor at University of Illinois Urbana-Champaign. He was an influential figure in the early years of the Mississippi Valley Historical Association (today known as the Organization of American Historians).

He was winner of the 1918 Loubat Prize for his book The Mississippi Valley in British Politics. He is known for his historical research of the American frontier. Alvord spent most of his career at the University of Illinois Urbana-Champaign, where between 1897 and 1920 he worked his way up the academic ranks from prep school teacher to full professor of history.

Alvord was born in Massachusetts on May 21, 1868. He graduated from Williams College in 1891. He studied history at Friedrich Wilhelm University in Berlin from 1893 to 1895 and at the University of Chicago in 1896. He received his PhD in 1908 from the University of Illinois.

He taught in the Preparatory School of the University of Illinois from 1897-1901. He joined the faculty in 1901, first as instructor from 1901 to 1906; as associate from 1906 to 1907; as assistant professor from 1907 to 1909; as associate professor from 1909 to 1913; and as professor from 1913-1920.

In 1926 he was the first non-British person to give the University of London's Creighton Lecture.

After years of illness, he died in Diano Marina, near Genoa in Italy on January 24, 1928.

He married twice and had one daughter.

== Sources ==
- The State Historical Society of Missouri
