= Pete Greenwood =

English singer-songwriter (born 1980)

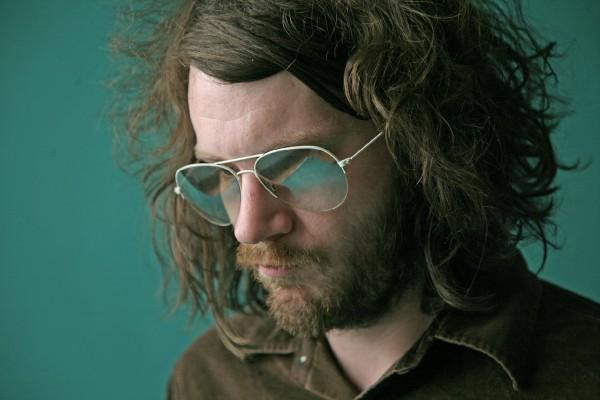

Background information
- Born: 23 June 1980 (age 46); Morley, Leeds, England
- Origin: London, England
- Genres: Folk rock, blues, americana, acoustic rock
- Occupation: Singer-songwriter
- Instruments: Vocals, guitar, piano, bass, double bass, harmonica, strings, keyboards
- Years active: 2002–present
- Labels: Heavenly Records (UK), DELL'ORSO Records (UK), Graveface Records (USA), Redbricks Recordings (UK), Brown Leather Jacket Records
- Website: Bandcamp website

Pete Greenwood (born 23 June 1980) is an English singer-songwriter. He is most well known for his debut album Sirens. Greenwood is also known for his previous work with psychedelic rock band The See See and country rock band The Loose Salute. He has toured in Mojave 3 and Starsailor. Greenwood was born in Morley, Leeds, England and grew up in Headingley.

== Career ==
=== Biography ===
Pete Greenwood started his career playing guitar in pubs in South London, honing his craft surrounded by fellow troubadours of the early 2000s Folk scene. Pete attended Goldsmiths, University of London for a degree in music where encouraged by his professor Pete Astor, he wrote his first two songs there – "Any Given Day" and "Bats Over Barstow".

With a reputation as one of the city's hottest Guitarists, Mojave 3 invited him on tour and he came back to a record deal with Heavenly Recordings. The album '’Sirens" resulted, earning him four stars and Debut of the Month August 2008 in Uncut Magazine. "Sirens" also made UNCUT's Top 50 list for 2008 year.

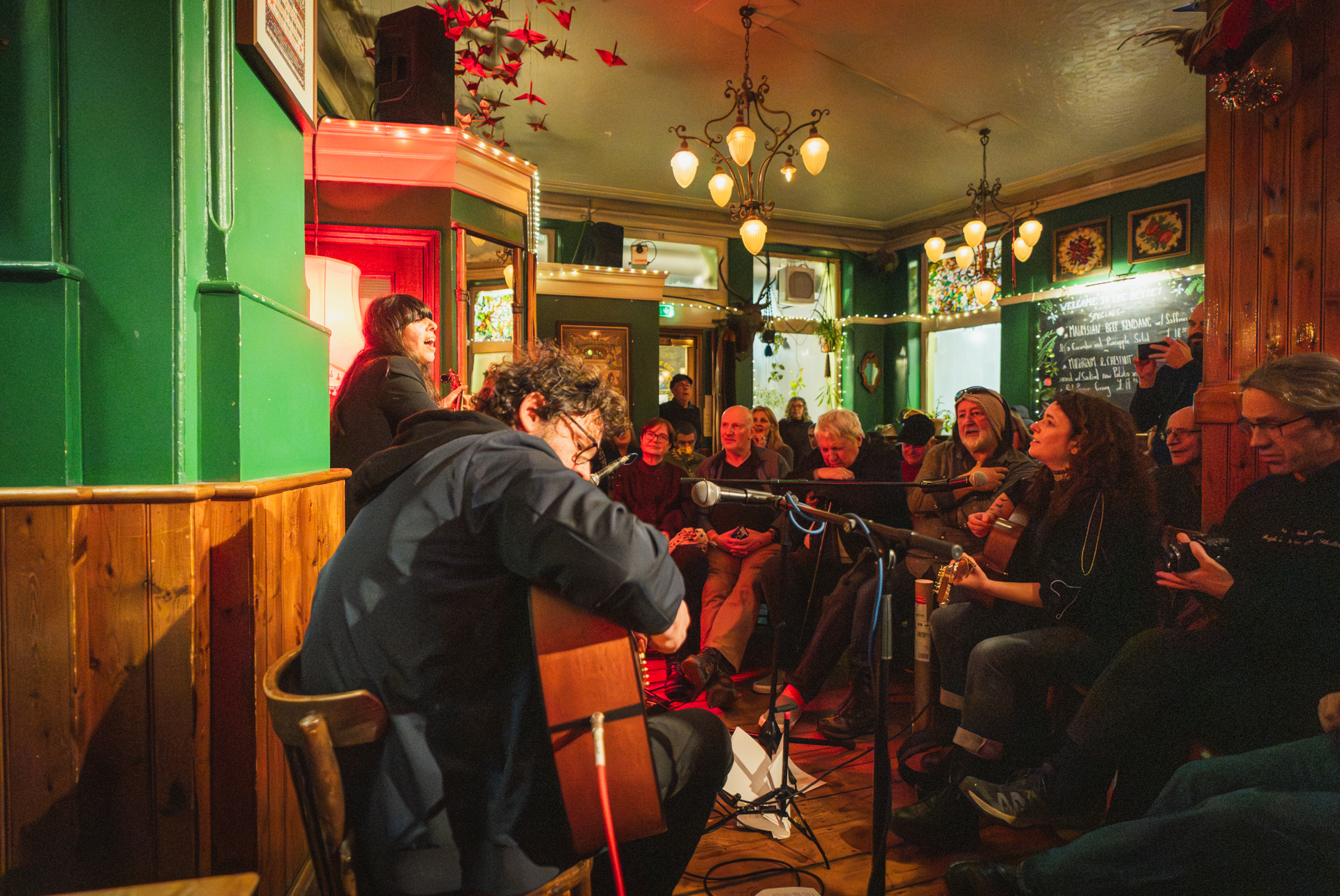
Emma Tricca, Pete Greenwood and Polly Paulusma in 2026

Greenwood later joined The See See – a London-based psychedelic pop supergroup – who were handpicked to support The Raconteurs and The Brian Jonestown Massacre. Dividing his time between solo and band projects, Pete toured USA, Canada, Japan, Europe, UK. Pete later also joined Starsailor on their European tour as a featured musician. In amongst the touring and recording for compilations (MOJO "White Album Recovered", Rough Trade "Psych Folk") Pete recorded his follow up album Beauceron. However, delays ensued resulting in a return to his native Leeds and a change of record label.

"The 88" (taken from the album Beauceron) is often referenced as a firm fan live favourite, originally released as a limited edition split 7-inch single with Doves on Rough Trade Records in 2009 (re-released as a standalone 7-inch in 2013). Noel Gallagher cited Pete Greenwood's track "The 88" in his Perfect Playlists for Q Magazine in 2013, voting the track his "Song of the Year" stating he wished he'd written it.

Greenwood returned to the live music scene in 2015 with the first official single, "Me And Molly", released on 18 September 2015, taken from the album, Beauceron, which was released on 16 October 2015.

=== Bands ===
- The Loose Salute (2003–2006)
- Mojave 3 (Session 2004–2005)
- Starsailor (Session 2008–2009)
- The See See (−2012)

== Discography ==
=== Albums ===
- Tuned To Love – The Loose Salute Graveface Records (USA) and Heavenly Recordings (UK) (2007)
- Late Morning Light – The See See DELL'ORSO Records (UK) (2007)
- Fountayne Mountain – The See See DELL'ORSO Records (UK) (2012)
- Sirens – Pete Greenwood Heavenly Recordings (UK) (2008)
- Beauceron – Pete Greenwood Brown Leather Jacket Records (UK) (2015)

=== Singles ===
- "Up the Hill/ Citadel Shuffel" The See See (2008) (Great Pop Supplement)
- "Keep Your Head/ Clap Your Hands" The See See (2009) (Great Pop Supplement)
- "Mary Soul" The See See (2010) (Great Pop Supplement)
- "Shake A Chain" The See See (2010) (Great Pop Supplement)
- "Heavy Eva/ Bats Over Barstow" Pete Greenwood (2007) (Great Pop Supplement)
- "Penny Dreadful" Pete Greenwood (2009) (Redbrick Recordings, Heavenly Recordings)
- "Sirens" Pete Greenwood (2008) (Digital)
- "The 88" Pete Greenwood (2009) (Limited Split single with Doves)
- "Songs from Bone Hill" (2009) (Unreleased Live B- Sides, Covers)
- "Me & Molly" (2015) (Brown Leather Jacket Records)

=== Compilation albums ===
- Rough Trade Psych Folk Comp
- MOJO White Album Recovered – Pete Greenwood "Savoy Shuffle" (George Harrison)
- Bob's Folk Show: Live Sessions Volume 1 “The 88” – Pete Greenwood
