= Dixie Professor of Ecclesiastical History =

Professorship at the University of Cambridge

The Dixie Professorship of Ecclesiastical History is one of the senior professorships in history at the University of Cambridge.

Lord Mayor of London in the 16th century Sir Wolstan Dixie left funds to found both scholarships and fellowships at Emmanuel College, Cambridge. In 1878 the fellowships were abolished and replaced by the professorship that still bears his name.

== Dixie Professors ==
- Mandell Creighton (1884)
- Henry Melvill Gwatkin (1891–1912)
- James Pounder Whitney (1919–1939)
- Norman Sykes FBA (1944)
- William Owen Chadwick (1958)
- Ernest Gordon Rupp (1968)
- Christopher Nugent Lawrence Brooke (1977)
- Jonathan Simon Christopher Riley-Smith (1994)
- David James Maxwell (2011)
