= Lillian Penson =

English professor of modern history (1896–1963)

Dame Lillian Margery Penson, DBE (18 July 1896 – 17 April 1963) was a professor of modern history at the University of London, and the first woman to serve as vice-chancellor of the university.

== Early life ==
She was born in Islington, London, the eldest daughter of a wholesale dairy manager. She was educated privately and then first attended Birkbeck College and then University College, London where she graduated BA in 1917 with a first and in 1921 one of the earliest PhDs.

== Career ==
A full professor at the age of 34, Lillian Penson served as a member of the University of London senate for 20 years. She was a member of the University Court, Dean of the Faculty of Arts and Chairman of the Academic Council before being elected in 1948 as Vice-Chancellor of the university. Her accession to this office was put into perspective by a writer who said: "It was not the fact that she was the first woman to become chancellor of a University in the Commonwealth which attracted attention, but rather her vigorous, purposeful, and clear-headed approach to the many problems which the University of London faced."

In addition to her contribution to the University of London, Dame Lillian made an outstanding contribution to the development of higher education in the then colonial territories and she maintained a close interest in those university colleges overseas which, with her wholehearted support, had entered into special relationships with the University of London. Honours flowed to her after she became Vice-Chancellor - honorary degrees from many universities including Cambridge and Oxford, a DBE, and even an honorary fellowship from the Royal College of Surgeons.

== Academic career ==
Lillian Penson served as professor of Modern History at Bedford College, University of London from 1930 to 1962, before becoming Professor Emeritus. She was a member of the council of university college of Rhodesia and Nyasaland since 1955, and held positions at Birkbeck College and Queen Mary College.

Her primary subjects of academic expertise were the life and diplomatic statecraft of the last Victorian Prime Minister, Lord Salisbury, as well as the foreign policies of European Powers preceding the First World War.

As an appreciation to her efforts and as a commemoration, the University of London named one of its Intercollegiate halls after her, the Lillian Penson Hall.

== Personal life ==
She was appointed DBE in 1951. She died at her home, 54 Marine Parade, Brighton, on 17 April 1963. She was unmarried.

In 2017, she featured in a conference, London's Women Historians, held at the Institute of Historical Research.

== Honorary degrees ==
- Honorary LL.D., University of Cambridge
- Honorary LL.D., University of Leeds
- Honorary LL.D., McGill University
- Honorary LL.D., University of St Andrews
- Honorary LL.D., University of Southampton
- Honorary D.C.L., University of Oxford
- Honorary D.L., University of Sheffield
- Honorary LL.D., University of Western Ontario
- Honorary D.L., Queen's University of Belfast
- Honorary Fellow, Royal College of Surgeons

== Books ==
- "The Colonial Agents of the British West Indies" - 1924
- "Foreign Affairs under the Third Marquis of Salisbury" - 1962

== See also ==
- List of Vice-Chancellors of the University of London

== Sources ==
- Who's Who 1961-1970 - United Kingdom
- University of London

Academic offices
Preceded by Sir David Hughes Parry	Vice-Chancellor of the University of London; 1948-1951	Succeeded by Hugh Hale Bellot
