= David M. Palliser =

British historian

David Michael Palliser FSA (born September 1939) is emeritus professor of medieval history at the University of Leeds. He is the former editor of the Royal Historical Society's Bibliography of British and Irish History. He is a director of the Marc Fitch Fund.

== Selected publications ==
- Towns and Local Communities in Medieval and Early Modern England (Variorum Collected Studies)
- Tudor York (Oxford Historical Monographs).
- The Diocesan Population Returns for 1563 and 1603.
- The Age of Elizabeth: England under the later Tudors 1547-1603 (series Social and Economic History of England edited by Asa Briggs), 1983; 2nd ed. 1992.
