= Lynam =

Lynam may refer to:

== People ==
- Charles Lynam (1829–1921), English architect
- Charles Cotterill Lynam (1858–1938), English headmaster and yachtsman
- Des Lynam (born 1942), British television and radio presenter
- Donald Lynam (born 1967), American psychologist
- Ian Lynam (born 1970), Irish hurler and coach
- James Lynam Molloy (1837–1909), Irish composer
- Jonathan Lynam, Westmeath Gaelic footballer
- Jim Lynam (born 1941), American basketball coach and analyst
- Joe Lynam (born 1970), Irish journalist
- Joss Lynam (1924–2011), Irish mountaineer
- Ray Lynam (born 1951), Irish singer
- Robert Lynam (writer) (1796–1845), British writer
- Severus William Lynam Stretton (1783–1884), British soldier

== Other uses ==
- Lynam, Queensland, a locality in City of Townsville, Australia
- Lynam (band), an American hard rock band

== See also ==
- Linehan, an Irish surname
- Lyneham (disambiguation)
- Anthony Lynham (born 1960), Australian politician
