= Lineham =

Lineham is a surname. Notable people with the surname include:

- Edwin Lineham (1879–1949), English cricketer
- John Lineham (1857–1913), politician and businessman from Northwest Territories, Canada
- Kimberly Lineham (born 1962), American swimmer
- Tania Lineham (1966–2018), New Zealand science teacher
- Tom Lineham (born 1991), English rugby league player

== See also ==
- Linehan, a surname (with a list of people of this name)
- Lyneham (disambiguation)
- Kwik-Fit (GB) Ltd v Lineham, UK labour law case concerning unfair dismissal
- Lineham Discovery Well No. 1, defunct oil well and national historic site of Canada
