= David McKitterick =

English librarian and academic

David John McKitterick, FSA, FBA (born 9 January 1948) is an English librarian and academic, who was Librarian and Fellow of Trinity College, Cambridge.

== Early life and education ==
McKitterick was born on 9 January 1948 to the Revd Canon J. H. B. McKitterick and Marjory McKitterick (née Quarterman). He was educated at King's College School, a private school in Wimbledon, London. He studied at St John's College, Cambridge, graduating with a Bachelor of Arts (BA) degree in 1969: as per tradition, his BA was promoted to a Master of Arts (MA Cantab) in 1973. He studied library science at University College London, completing a diploma (DipLib) in 1971.

== Career ==
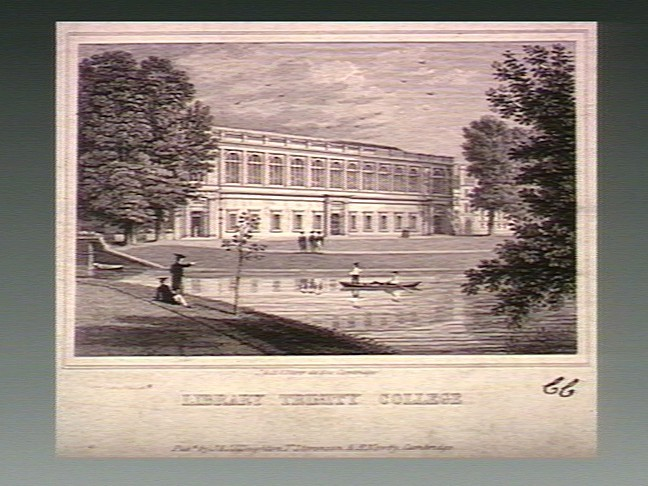
Trinity College, Cambridge; the Wren Library from the Backs.

He worked at the Cambridge University Library from 1969 to 1970 and from 1971 to 1986. He was a Fellow of Darwin College, Cambridge from 1978 to 1986. He was elected a Fellow of Trinity College, Cambridge: he served as its librarian from 1986 to 2015 and its Vice-Master from 2012 to 2016.

In 1987 he gave the Englehard Lecture at the Center for the Book at the Library of Congress.

McKitterick became a member of the Roxburghe Club in 1998.

He held the Lyell Readership in Bibliography at the University of Oxford in the 1999–2000 academic year and the Sandars Reader in Bibliography at the University of Cambridge in 2000–2001.

In 2006, he was made an Honorary Professor of Historical Bibliography by the University of Cambridge.

He is the author of various works on bibliography and library history, including a history of Cambridge University Library in the 18th and 19th centuries.

== Personal life ==
In 1976, McKitterick married Rosamond McKitterick, who became the Professor of Medieval History at the University of Cambridge. Together they have one daughter.

== Honours ==
On 23 November 1989, McKitterick was elected a Fellow of the Society of Antiquaries of London (FSA). In 1995, he was elected a Fellow of the British Academy (FBA), the United Kingdom's national academy for the humanities and social sciences.

== Selected publications ==
- McKitterick, David. 2022. Readers in a Revolution: Bibliographical Change in the Nineteenth Century. New York, NY: Cambridge University Press.
- McKitterick, David, Phil Cleaver, and Roxburghe Club. 2019. The Philobiblon Society: Sociability & Book Collecting in Mid-Victorian Britain. London, England: The Roxburghe Club.
- McKitterick, David. 2019. “Henry Bradshaw as Librarian.” Transactions of the Cambridge Bibliographical Society 16 (4): 517–34.
- McKitterick, David. 2018. The Invention of Rare Books: Private Interest and Public Memory, 1600-1840. Cambridge, United Kingdom: Cambridge University Press.
- McKitterick, David. 2013. Old Books, New Technologies: The Representation, Conservation and Transformation of Books since 1700. Cambridge [England]: Cambridge University Press.
- McKitterick, David. "Exhibiting the Printed Book." The Library 7th series, vol. 11, no. 2, June 2010, pp. 127–150.
- McKitterick, David. 2010. A Changing View from Amsterdam: Where next with Book History? Amsterdam: Vossiuspers UvA.
- McKitterick, David. 2009. The Cambridge History of the Book in Britain. Volume 6, 1830-1914. Cambridge: Cambridge University Press.
- McKitterick, David. 2005. The Trinity Apocalypse (Trinity College Cambridge, MS R.16.2). London, Toronto: British Library; University of Toronto Press.
- McKitterick, David. 2003. Print, Manuscript, and the Search for Order, 1450-1830. Cambridge, UK: Cambridge University Press.
- McKitterick, David. 1995. The Making of the Wren Library, Trinity College, Cambridge. Cambridge: Cambridge University Press.
- McKitterick, David. 1992. A History of Cambridge University Press. Cambridge [England]: Cambridge University Press.
- McKitterick, David, Edward Bawden, Curwen Press, and Whittington Press. n.d. Wallpapers by Edward Bawden Printed at the Curwen Press. Andoversford: Whittington Press.
- McKitterick, David. 1986. Cambridge University Library: A History: The Eighteenth and Nineteenth Centuries. Cambridge [Cambridgeshire]: Cambridge University Press.
- McKitterick, David, and Cambridge University Library. 1985. Typographers Tallied: The Origin and Growth of the Stanley Morison Room, Cambridge University Library. [Andoversford]: Whittington Press.
- McKitterick, David, Cambridge University Library, and Cambridge University Press. 1984. Four Hundred Years of University Printing and Publishing in Cambridge, 1584-1984: Catalogue of the Exhibition in the University Library, Cambridge. Cambridge [Cambridgeshire]: Cambridge University Press.
- McKitterick, David. 1983. The Sandars and Lyell Lectures: A Checklist with an Introduction. New York: Jonathan A. Hill.
- McKitterick, David. 1979."Pepys--And After." The Book Collector 28 (no 4) Winter: 487-500.
- McKitterick, David, and Thomas Knyvett. 1978. The Library of Sir Thomas Knyvett of Ashwellthorpe, c. 1539-1618. [Cambridge]: Cambridge University Library.
