= Charles Previté-Orton =

British historian (1877–1947)

Charles Previté-Orton FBA
- Born: Charles William Previté-Orton; 16 January 1877; Arnesby, England
- Died: 11 March 1947 (aged 70); Cambridge, England
- Spouse: Ellery Swaffield Orton (m. 1913)

Academic background
- Education: St John's College, Cambridge

Academic work
- Discipline: Historian
- Sub-discipline: Medieval history
- Institutions: St John's College, Cambridge
- Notable works: The Cambridge Medieval History (vols 3–8; 1922–1936)

Charles William Previté-Orton FBA (16 January 1877 – 11 March 1947) was a British medieval historian and the first Professor of Medieval History at the University of Cambridge on the establishment of the position in 1937.

== Biography ==
Previté-Orton was born on 16 January 1877 in Arnesby in Leicestershire, the son of William Previté (later Previté Orton), vicar of Arnesby, and Elizabeth Swaffield Orton. Previté-Orton's paternal grandfather was born in Sicily, with forebears from Sampieri. Previté-Orton attended Franklin's Preparatory School in Stoneygate. After losing an eye at the age of 14, he was not sufficiently well to attend university until 1905 at the age of 28. By that time, he had already published a book of verse entitled Cinara and Other Poems (1900). A scholar of St John's College, Cambridge, he was placed in the first class of each part of the history tripos and was elected a fellow of his college in 1911, where he remained for the duration of his life.

From 1925 to 1938 he was editor of the English Historical Review; he was elected a Fellow of the British Academy in 1929 and was appointed as Cambridge's first Professor of Medieval History in 1937, holding the position until 1942. He died on 11 March 1947.

Previté-Orton's major work, in conjunction with Zachary Nugent Brooke, was to oversee as editor the later volumes of the eight-volume Cambridge Medieval History, completed in 1937. However, he achieved his greatest historical influence among general readers rather than scholars through his three general textbooks, Outlines of Medieval History (1916), Methuen's textbook A History of Europe, 1198–1378 (1937), and the posthumously published Shorter Cambridge Medieval History (2 vols., 1952).

According to Barrie Dobson, who would some four decades later succeed to the chair of medieval history at Cambridge,

in the opinion of those who knew him personally, as a scholar Previté was lucid and accurate but passionless rather than original. As an editor, however, he was critical, shrewd, painstaking, and generous: few scholars made so sustained a contribution to the reputation of medieval studies at Cambridge during the first half of the twentieth century.

In 1913, Previté-Orton married his first cousin, Ellery Swaffield Orton; they had a daughter, Rosalind.

Academic offices
| New office | Professor of Medieval History at the University of Cambridge; 1937–1942 | Succeeded by Zachary Brooke |
