= Rosamond McKitterick =

English medieval historian (1949–2026)

Rosamond McKitterick FSA FRSA FRHistS
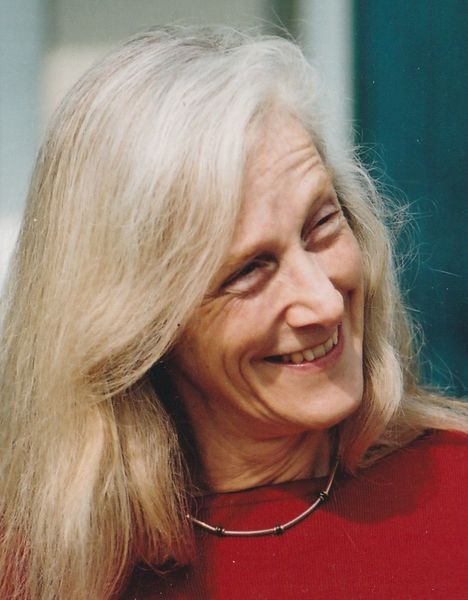
- Born: Rosamond Deborah Pierce; 31 May 1949; Chesterfield, England
- Died: 13 June 2026 (aged 77)
- Spouse: David McKitterick (m. 1976)
- Awards: Heineken Prize (2010)

Academic background
- Education: University of Western Australia; University of Cambridge
- Thesis: The Carolingian Renaissance (1976)
- Doctoral advisor: Walter Ullmann

Academic work
- Discipline: History
- Sub-discipline: Medieval history
- Institutions: Newnham College, Cambridge; Sidney Sussex College, Cambridge
- Doctoral students: Sarah Foot; Matthew Innes
- Main interests: Franks

Rosamond Deborah McKitterick (31 May 1949 – 13 June 2026) was an English medieval historian. She was an expert on the Frankish kingdoms in the eighth and ninth centuries AD, who used palaeographical and manuscript studies to illuminate aspects of the political, cultural, intellectual, religious, and social history of the Early Middle Ages. From 1999 until 2016 she was Professor of Medieval History and director of research at the University of Cambridge. She was a Fellow of Sidney Sussex College and Professor Emerita of Medieval History in the University of Cambridge.

== Early life and education ==
McKitterick was born Rosamond Pierce in Chesterfield, Derbyshire, England, on 31 May 1949. From 1951 to 1956 she lived in Cambridge, England, where her father had a position at Magdalene College. In 1956 she moved with her family to Western Australia where she completed primary and secondary school and completed an honours degree at the University of Western Australia. She holds the degrees of MA, PhD, and LittD from the University of Cambridge.

Her doctoral thesis was entitled The Carolingian Renaissance: A Study in the Education of a Society. It was submitted under McKitterick's maiden name of Pierce. The thesis was approved on 24 February 1976. McKitterick's supervisor was Walter Ullmann.

== Academic career ==
In 1971 she returned to Cambridge University to pursue her career. She was a Fellow of Newnham College, Cambridge and then became a professorial fellow of Sidney Sussex College. McKitterick has been described as a "doyenne in her field; her decades of tireless research and teaching have been poured into a steady stream of major publications on Carolingian subjects." Thomas F.X. Noble considers McKitterick to be "one of the most original and productive historians of Europe's early Middle Ages". She supervised 42 PhD theses to completion, as of October 2015, with five more in progress. She was a member of the council of the British School at Rome, donating to support projects in memory of her sister Dr Judith Maitland.

== Personal life and death ==
She married David McKitterick, Librarian of Trinity College, Cambridge, in 1976. They had one daughter.

In May 2016, McKitterick was one of 300 prominent historians, including Simon Schama and Niall Ferguson, who were signatories to a letter to The Guardian, telling voters that if they chose to leave the European Union on 23 June, they would be condemning Britain to irrelevance.

McKitterick died on 13 June 2026, aged 77.

== Honours ==
McKitterick was a Balsdon Fellow at the British School in Rome, April–June 2002. Her research focus was "Charlemagne in Italy". From 2005 to 2006 she was a Fellow at the Netherlands Institute of Advanced Study.

In 2010 McKitterick was awarded the Dr A. H. Heineken International Prize for History by the Royal Dutch Academy. The prize was established in 1990 and is awarded bi-annually for outstanding scholarly achievement in the field of history. Other awardees include Judith Herrin and Aleida Assman. In 2015 McKitterick was elected to the Lectio Chair at the Katholieke Universiteit of Leuven's Centre for the Transmission of Texts and Ideas in Antiquity, the Middle Ages, and the Renaissance.

On 16 March 2017, McKitterick was elected a Fellow of the Society of Antiquaries of London (FSA). She was also an elected Fellow of the Royal Historical Society (FRHistS) and a Fellow of the Royal Society of Arts (FRSA). She was the President of the Ecclesiastical History Society (2018–19). McKitterick was a Fellow of the Medieval Academy of America, Monumenta Germaniae Historica, and the Austrian Academy of Sciences.

On 15 October 2018, McKitterick delivered the James Lydon Lecture in Medieval History and Culture at Trinity College Dublin with "Rome and the Invention of the Papacy in the Early Middle Ages".

In 2018 McKitterick was honoured with a Festschrift, Writing the Early Medieval West, to mark her retirement in September 2016. The volume consists of contributions from fifteen of McKitterick's former students.

== Publications ==
=== Monographs ===
- The Frankish Church and the Carolingian Reforms, 789–895 (1977)
- The Frankish Kingdoms under the Carolingians, 751–987 (1983)
- McKitterick, Rosamond (1989). The Carolingians and the Written Word. Cambridge: Cambridge University Press. ISBN 0-521-30539-X. LCCN 88029232. OCLC 18520955. OL 2051517M. Wikidata Q20379452.
- Books, Scribes and Learning in the Frankish Kingdoms, 6th to 9th Centuries. (Collected Studies; 452.) Aldershot: Variorum, (1994)
- The Frankish Kings and Culture in the Early Middle Ages (1995)
- History and Memory in the Carolingian World (2004)
- Perceptions of the Past in the Early Middle Ages (2006)
- Charlemagne: The Formation of a European Identity (2008)
- Rome and the Invention of the Papacy: The Liber Pontificalis (2020)

Edited volumes

- (ed. with Dorothy Whitelock and David Dumville) Ireland in Mediaeval Europe: Studies in Memory of Kathleen Hughes (Cambridge: Cambridge University Press, 1982)
- (ed.) The Uses of Literacy in Early Medieval Europe (1990)
- (ed. with Lida Lopes Cardozo) Lasting Letters: An Inscription for the Abbots of St Albans (Cambridge: Kindersley Cardozo 1992)
- (ed.) Carolingian Culture: Emulation and Innovation (1994)
- (ed.) The New Cambridge Medieval History, II: c.700–c.900 (1995)
- (ed., with Roland Quinault) Edward Gibbon and Empire (Cambridge: Cambridge University Press, 1997)
- (ed.) The Early Middle Ages, 400–1000 (2001)
- (ed.) Carolingian Culture: Emulation and Innovation (Cambridge: Cambridge University Press, 1993)
- (ed.) Atlas of the Medieval World (2004)

=== Festschrift ===
- Writing the Early Medieval West, edited by Elina Screen and Charles West (Cambridge: Cambridge University Press, 2018)

=== Articles and book chapters ===
- "Knowledge of Canon Law in the Frankish Kingdoms Before 789: The Manuscript Evidence", The Journal of Theological Studies, NEW SERIES, Vol. 36, No. 1 (APRIL 1985), pp. 97–117; Oxford Journals, Oxford University Press, Clarendon Press, London
- "The Papacy and Byzantium in the Seventh- and Early Eighth-Century Sections of the Liber Pontificalis", Papers of the British School in Rome, 84 (2016) 241–73
- "The Popes as Rulers of Rome in the Aftermath of Empire, 476–769", with Stewart J. Brown, Charlotte Methuen and Andrew Spicer, Studies In Church History, 54 (2018) 71–95

Academic offices
Preceded by Barrie Dobson	Professor of Medieval History at the University of Cambridge; 1999–2016	Succeeded by John H. Arnold
Professional and academic associations
Preceded by Morwenna Ludlow	President of the Ecclesiastical History Society; 2018–2019	Succeeded by Alec Ryrie
