= Rosalind Brooke =

British medievalist

Rosalind Beckford Brooke FSA FRHistS
- Born: Rosalind Beckford Clark; 5 November 1925; Chipstead, Surrey, England
- Died: 17 November 2014 (aged 89)
- Occupations: Author; Academic
- Spouse: Christopher N. L. Brooke (m. 1951)
- Parent(s): Leslie H.S. Clark and Doris F. Clark

Academic background
- Education: Girton College, Cambridge

Academic work
- Discipline: Historian
- Sub-discipline: Medieval History; Franciscans
- Institutions: Gonville and Caius College, Cambridge

Rosalind Beckford Brooke (née Clark) FSA FRHistS (5 November 1925 – 17 November 2014) was a British medieval historian and art historian. She was an expert on St Francis of Assisi and wrote several books on the Franciscan order. Brooke taught medieval history at Liverpool, London, and Cambridge universities.

== Early life and education ==
Born Rosalind Beckford Clark in Chipstead, Surrey on 5 November 1925, to Leslie H.S. Clark, a hospital physicist with expertise in medical radiology, and Doris F. Clark, a teacher. Brooke attended St Leonards School in St Andrews, before undertaking an undergraduate and postgraduate doctoral degree at Girton College, Cambridge in 1943. At this time, women were not awarded degrees at Cambridge; the policy was changed in 1948, allowing her to pursue a PhD. After completing her undergraduate studies she enrolled for PhD under the supervision of David Knowles. She wrote her doctoral thesis on Brother Elias.

== Academic career ==
In 1950 Brooke finished her doctoral thesis, which she developed into her first book, Early Franciscan Government, published in 1959. She dedicated sixty years to the study of St Francis and the Franciscan Order. In 2006 at the age of 81, Brooke published her final work, The Image of St Francis: responses to sainthood in the thirteenth century, which expanded her study of St Francis’ image to explore visual depictions of the saint as well, drawing on documentary, literary, architectural, and artistic sources together.

Brooke's early works explored the hagiographies of St Francis, engaging with, albeit indirectly, the Franciscan Question. In Early Franscican Government, for example, she contrasted Thomas of Celano’s Vita Prima and Vita Secunda, noting that Brother Elias’ fall from grace, an event that occurred between the authorship of the two texts, impacted how Elias was depicted by Thomas of Celano, and therefore impacted the reliability of both sources. In her translation of the Scripta Leonis, Brooke argued that we are given access to St Francis’ mind and heart. Regarding Bonaventure’s Major Legend, she suggested the work was an elegant pastiche of earlier Lives, which in turn reflected what she noted as an admiration and veneration of St Francis ‘but as an inspiration rather than as a model’. The Image of St Francis examined how stained glass and frescos that depicted the saint also passed on his spirit and teachings. In her examination of the various texts and images of St Francis, she demonstrated a ‘real image of St Francis’ that shone through the myriad sources of his life.

In Early Franciscan Government, Brooke also sought to de-mythologise Brother Elias, second Minister General of the Order of Friars Minor, making a cautionary ‘hermeneutical reconstruction of the historical Elias’. She evaluated in relentless detail the consistencies and differing perspectives that characterise Brother Elias in the Vita Prima and Vita Secunda of Thomas of Celano, and the chronicles of Jordan of Giano, Thomas of Eccleston, and Salimbene. She concluded that later writers intensified Elias’ wickedness and exaggerated his importance, characterising him as ‘the Judas who betrayed St Francis’ ideal’. She argued instead that Elias made no very deep imprint, except in legend, and was not alone responsible for modifications to the Rule under him.

Brooke spent her academic career in Cambridge, Liverpool, and London where her husband Christopher Brooke held permanent posts. She ran tutorials when she began her academic career in Cambridge, and took up further supervision work with students when she returned later in her career. While in London, she held an academic post at University College London, teaching history. She and Christopher moved to Cambridge in 1977.

Brooke and her husband Christopher often collaborated and supported one another with their academic work. Both of them referenced one another in their acknowledgements frequently, often with great wit and humour. For The Coming of the Friars Brooke thanked Christopher ‘for his constant, unstinted collaboration’. In the Scripta Leonis, after expressing a debt ‘impossible to acknowledge fully’ she remarked that ‘many a problem became clearer in trying to explain it to him’. In turn, Christopher also noted his great debt to Brooke for her collaboration and support, thanking her in the preface to the Twelfth Century Renaissance for ‘much encouragement and penetrating criticism’, from which ‘this the book has greatly benefitted’. Brooke co-authored two works with her husband: a book titled Popular Religion in the Middle Ages: Western Europe 1000–1300 and a chapter titled ‘St Clare’ in Medieval Women, edited by Christopher. She dedicated her final work The Image of St Francis, to Christopher with the following passage:

I acknowledge innumerable debts to my research assistant, secretary, picture researcher, indexer and husband of fifty-four summers and winters, Christopher – whose unstinting help and exemplary impatience have shaped this book. I dedicate it to him.

— Brooke, Rosalind B. The Image of St Francis: Responses to Sainthood in the Thirteenth Century (Cambridge University Press, Cambridge, 2006).

This was written on her 80th birthday.

== Later life ==
In 2007 Brooke was conferred with a D.Litt. award as a mark of ‘her sterling contribution to the debates surrounding St Francis and the early history, hagiography and art of the Franciscan community’. On 17 November 2014, Brooke died in Cambridge at the age of 89.

== Personal life ==
Brooke was introduced to her future husband Christopher Brooke through their joint acquaintance with David Knowles, and they were married in Cambridge on 18 August 1951. Their marriage lasted 63 years until her death in 2014. Christopher died on 27 December 2015, a year after Brooke. They were survived by two of their three children and seven grandchildren.

== Bibliography ==
- Brother Elias and the Government of the Franciscan Order 1217–1239, Cambridge University PhD., no.1678 (1950), available in the Manuscript Room of Cambridge University Library.
- Early Franciscan Government: Elias to Bonaventure, Cambridge Studies in Medieval Life and Thought, new series 7 (Cambridge University Press, Cambridge, 1959), reprinted as a print-on-demand paperback in 2006.
- ‘The Lives of St Francis of Assisi’, in Latin Biography, ed. Thomas A. Dorey (Routledge and Kegan Paul, London, 1967), pp. 177–98.
- Scripta Leonis, Rufini et Angeli sociorum S. Francisci, OMT (Oxford University Press, Oxford, 1970). Reprinted in 1990.
- ‘St Bonaventure as Minister General’, in S.Bonaventura Francescano 14–17 ottobre 1973, Convegni del centro di studi sulla spiritualità medievale 14 (Todi, 1974), pp. 75–105.
- The Coming of the Friars, Historical Problems, Studies and Documents 24 (Allen and Unwin Ltd., London, 1975).
- ‘La prima espansione francescana in Europa, Atti del XLI Convegno internazionale Assisi, 12–14 ottobre, 1978’, in Espansione del francescanesimo tra Occidente e Oriente, Società internazionale di studi francescani, Centro interuniversitario di studi francescani 6 (Spoleto, 1979), pp. 123–150.
- ‘The Legenda antiqua Sancti Francisci Perugia Ms. 1046’, in Analecta Bollandiana 99 (1981), pp. 165–168.
- ‘Recent work on St Francis of Assisi’, in Analecta Bollandiana 100 (1982), pp. 653–676.
- The Image of St Francis: Responses to Sainthood in the Thirteenth Century (Cambridge University Press, Cambridge, 2006).

Co-authored with C.N.L. Brooke

- ‘St Clare’, in Medieval Women, with C.N.L. Brooke, ed. D. Baker, Studies in Church History (Blackwell, Oxford, 1978), pp. 275–87.
- Popular Religion in the Middle Ages: Western Europe 1000–1300 (Thames and Hudson, London, 1984).
