= Lenihan =

"Lenihan" is an Irish surname. Variants include Lenighan, Lenegan, Lenaghan, Lenahan, and Lennihan. Lenehan and Linehan are similar names.

Notable people with the surname include:

== Athletes ==
- Darragh Lenihan, Irish professional football player
- Donal Lenihan (born 1959), Irish rugby union player
- Jim Lenihan, Australian rugby league player and coach
- Karl Lenihan, Gaelic football player

== People in the arts ==
- Edmund Lenihan (born 1950), Irish author
- Winifred Lenihan (1898–1964), American actress, writer and director

== Politicians ==
- Brian Lenihan Snr (1930–1995), Irish Fianna Fáil politician
- Brian Lenihan Jnr (1959–2011), Irish Fianna Fáil politician
- Conor Lenihan (born 1963), Irish Fianna Fáil politician
- J. Michael Lenihan (1943–2015), Rhode Island state senator
- Mary O'Rourke (née Lenihan; born 1937), Irish Fianna Fáil politician
- Patrick Lenihan (1902–1970), Fianna Fáil politician

== Officers ==
- Michael Joseph Lenihan (1865–1958), a US-army general in World War I

== Scientists ==
- J. M. A. Lenihan (1918–1993), British clinical physicist

== Religious leaders ==
- George Michael Lenihan (1858–1910), fifth Catholic Bishop of Auckland 1896–1910
- Thomas Mathias Lenihan (1843–1901), American Catholic bishop

== See also ==
- James J. Lenihan Dam, in Santa Clara County, California
- Lenehan, a surname
- Linehan, a surname
