= James Holt (historian) =

English medieval historian (1922–2014)

Sir James Holt FBA FRHistS
- Born: James Clarke Holt; 26 April 1922; North Bierley, England
- Died: 9 April 2014 (aged 91)
- Other names: J. C. Holt; Jim Holt
- Title: Master of Fitzwilliam College, Cambridge (1981–1988)
- Spouse: Alice Suley (m. 1951)

Academic background
- Education: The Queen's College, Oxford; Merton College, Oxford
- Thesis: The "Northern" Barons Under John (1952)
- Academic advisors: V. H. Galbraith; John Prestwich

Academic work
- Discipline: History
- Sub-discipline: Medieval history
- Institutions: University of Nottingham; University of Reading; Fitzwilliam College, Cambridge
- Notable students: George Garnett
- Main interests: Magna Carta
- Notable works: Magna Carta (1965)

Sir James Clarke Holt (26 April 1922 – 9 April 2014), also known as J. C. Holt and Jim Holt, was an English medieval historian, known particularly for his work on Magna Carta. He was the third Master of Fitzwilliam College, Cambridge, serving between 1981 and 1988.

== Career ==
Educated at Bradford Grammar School, Holt's studies at The Queen's College, Oxford, were interrupted by war service with the British Army, including 14 months in north-west Europe in 1944–1945. Returning to The Queen's College in 1945, he graduated with first-class honours in history in 1947, and subsequently took his DPhil with a thesis titled The "Northern" Barons Under John in 1952, at Merton College, Oxford.

Holt held the positions of Lecturer (1949–1962) and then Professor of Medieval History (1962–65) at the University of Nottingham, Professor of History at the University of Reading (1965–1978) and Professor of Medieval History at the University of Cambridge from 1978 until his retirement in 1988. From 1981 until 1988 he served as the Master of Fitzwilliam College.

Holt was on the governing body of Abingdon School from 1969 to 1979.

== Honours ==
Holt became a Fellow of the British Academy in 1978 and was its Vice President from 1987 to 1989, was president of the Royal Historical Society (1981–1985), and was knighted for his work as an historian.

== Publications ==
=== Magna Carta ===
Holt made his name with the book Magna Carta, which came out in its original edition in 1965. In this work he treated charter in the context of the political framework of its time. The second edition was published in 1992. Holt retained the thematic structure, although he had entertained the thought of revising the work as a clause by clause commentary. New appendices were added for the second edition, and previous ones were expanded. Some parts of the main text underwent limited revision. Holt did not defend his original analysis from critics as much as aggressively restate his views.

One of the most noted aspects of Holt's work on Magna Carta has been its attention to events in continental Europe. Several studies undertaken after the publication of the Second Edition have expanded on the turmoil between John and Pope Innocent III, most significantly the Albigensian Crusade. Holt's original analysis noted similarities between the Statute of Pamiers and Magna Carta, but remained cautious and unwilling to claim a direct influence. George Garnett and John Hudson write in the introduction of the Third Edition that "a picture of closer ties between the Crusade and developments in England can be sketched". Several of John's opponents in England were connected to the Crusade. Stephen Langton's brother Walter Langton and Hugh de Lacy fought alongside Simon de Montfort during the Albigensian Crusade in Languedoc. Baronial leader Robert fitz Walter fled to France in 1212 where he was given the title "Marshal of the Army of God and of the Holy Church in England". Holt originally called the title "imposing", but changed this in the second edition to "vainglorious and seditious".

=== Selected works ===
- The Northerners: A Study in the Reign of King John (1961)
- Magna Carta (1965)
- Magna Carta and the Idea of Liberty (1972) ISBN 9780471408451
- What's in a Name? Family Nomenclature and the Norman Conquest. (The Stenton Lecture 1981). University of Reading, 1982.
- Robin Hood, (London, 1982; 2011) ISBN 9780500289358
- Magna Carta and Medieval Government (1985; 2003: ISBN 9780907628385)
- (editor) Foundations for the Future: The University of Cambridge (1995) ISBN 9780521821339
- Colonial England, 1066–1215 (1997) ISBN 9781852851408
- Magna Carta (Cambridge, 2015)
  - マグナカルタ (2000) ISBN 9784766407822
- King John ISBN 9780521405126

== Personal life ==
Holt married Alice Suley in 1951; they had one son. Holt was "passionate about cricket".

== Death ==
Holt died on 9 April 2014, aged 91.

Academic offices
Preceded by Walter Ullmann	Professor of Medieval History at the University of Cambridge; 1978–1988	Succeeded by Barrie Dobson
Preceded by Edward Miller	Master of Fitzwilliam College, Cambridge; 1981–1988	Succeeded by Gordon Cameron
Professional and academic associations
Preceded by John Habakkuk	President of the Royal Historical Society; 1981–1985	Succeeded by Gerald Aylmer
