= Christopher N. L. Brooke =

British medievalist (1927–2015)

Christopher N. L. Brooke CBE FSA FBA FRHistS
- Born: Christopher Nugent Lawrence Brooke; 23 June 1927; Cambridge, England
- Died: 27 December 2015 (aged 88)
- Title: Dixie Professor of Ecclesiastical History (1977–1994)
- Spouse: Rosalind Brooke (m. 1951; died 2014)
- Parents: Rosa Brooke; Zachary Brooke

Academic background
- Education: Gonville and Caius College, Cambridge
- Influences: David Knowles

Academic work
- Discipline: Historian
- Sub-discipline: Medieval history; ecclesiastical history
- Institutions: University of Liverpool; Westfield College, London; Gonville and Caius College, Cambridge

Christopher Nugent Lawrence Brooke (23 June 1927 – 27 December 2015) was a British medieval historian. From 1974 to 1994 he was Dixie Professor of Ecclesiastical History at the University of Cambridge.

== Early life and education ==
Born on 23 June 1927, Brooke was the son of Zachary Nugent Brooke (1883–1946) and his wife Rosa Grace Brooke (1888–1964). Following schooling at Winchester College, Brooke undertook his undergraduate work at Gonville and Caius College, Cambridge, where he studied with David Knowles.

== Academic career ==
Brooke spent his early years as head of department at Westfield College, University of London, before taking up a post at Caius from 1977 to 1994, where he remained a life fellow. He held the position of Dixie Professor of Ecclesiastical History at Cambridge and before becoming a professor emeritus. He was President of the Ecclesiastical History Society (1968–1969).

== Personal life ==
Brooke met his future wife and fellow medievalist Rosalind Brooke (née Clark) at Cambridge in 1951. She died in 2014.

== Death ==
Brooke died on 27 December 2015 at the age of 88.

== Selected works ==
Among Brooke's publications are:

- The Letters of John of Salisbury. Vol. 1, The Early Letters (1153-1161) (1955) revised/co-editor
- The Investiture Disputes (1958)
- Carte Nativorum: A Peterborough Abbey Cartulary of the Fourteenth Century (1960)
- From Alfred to Henry III 871–1272 (1961)
- The Saxon and Norman Kings (1963)
- Gilbert Foliot and His Letters (1965)
- Religious Sentiment and Church Design in the Later Middle Ages (1967)
- Archbishop Lanfranc, the English Bishops and the Council of London of 1075 (1967)
- The Heads of Religious Houses, England and Wales: Volume 1, 940–1216 (1972)
- London, 800–1216: The Shaping of a City (1975)
- The Letters of John of Salisbury. Vol. 2, The Later Letters (1163–1180) (1979) co-editor
- The Architectural History of Winchester Cathedral/The Normans as Cathedral Builders (1980)
- Councils and Synods, with Other Documents Relating to the English Church: Volume I: A.D. 871–1204 (1981) in 2 vols.
- Monasteries of the World: The Rise and Development of the Monastic Tradition (1982)
- A History of Gonville and Caius College (1985)
- The Church and the Welsh Border in the Central Middle Ages (1986)
- Oxford and Cambridge (1988) (co-author with Roger Highfield)
- The Medieval Idea of Marriage (1989)
- Hugh the Chanter: The History of the Church of York, 1066–1127 (1990)
- A History of the University of Cambridge. Vol. 4, 1870–1990 (1992)
- Churches and Churchmen in Medieval Europe (1999)
- The Monastic Constitutions of Lanfranc (2002)

Academic offices
Preceded by Ernest Gordon Rupp	Dixie Professor of Ecclesiastical History; 1977–1994	Succeeded by Jonathan Riley-Smith
Professional and academic associations
Preceded by William Fergusson Irvine	President of the Record Society of Lancashire and Cheshire; 1962–67	Succeeded by Alec Reginald Myers
Preceded by A. G. Dickens	President of the Ecclesiastical History Society; 1968–1969	Succeeded by Walter Ullmann
