= Joshua Miller (psychologist) =

American psychologist

Joshua D. Miller
- Born: Joshua David Miller
- Education: Binghamton University; University of Kentucky
- Known for: Work on narcissism
- Awards: 2016 Theodore Millon Award in Personality Psychology from the American Psychological Foundation
- Scientific career
- Fields: Psychology
- Workplaces: University of Georgia
- Thesis: Personality and problem behaviors: An exploration of the mechanisms (2003)
- Doctoral advisor: Donald Lynam

Joshua D. Miller is an American psychologist and personality researcher. He is a professor of psychology in the University of Georgia's Franklin College of Arts and Sciences. He is known for researching narcissism.

== Honors and awards ==
Miller received the Theodore Millon Award in Personality Psychology from the American Psychological Foundation in 2016.
