= George Garnett =

British academic historian

Professor George Garnett FRHistS
- Born: 1958 (age 67–68); Watford, Hertfordshire, England
- Occupations: Historian and academic
- Title: Professor of Medieval History
- Partner: Helen Pike
- Children: 3

Academic background
- Education: Queens' College, Cambridge
- Doctoral advisor: Walter Ullmann; James Holt

Academic work
- Institutions: St John's College, Cambridge; Magdalene College, Cambridge; St Hugh's College, Oxford

George Stephen Garnett (born Watford, 1958) is a British academic historian, specialising in late Anglo-Saxon and Norman England. In 2014, the University of Oxford awarded him the title of Professor of Medieval History.

== Education and career ==
Garnett completed his undergraduate and doctoral degrees at Queens' College, Cambridge, matriculating in 1977. His graduate work was supervised first by Walter Ullmann and then, after Ullmann's death, Sir James Holt. Garnett won the Royal Historical Society's Alexander Prize in 1986. His doctoral dissertation was awarded the Prince Consort Prize by the university's Faculty of History in 1988. Garnett was elected successively to a Research Fellowship at St John's College, Cambridge and a Teaching Fellowship at Magdalene College, Cambridge. He was appointed a Tutorial Fellow of St Hugh's College, Oxford, in 1990 and also a lecturer at Lady Margaret Hall, Oxford. From 2008–2010 he held a Leverhulme Trust Major Research Fellowship. In 2014, the University awarded him the title of Professor of Medieval History. The following year, he was appointed the University's Senior Proctor.

In May 2025, Garnett was appointed Literary Director of the Selden Society, a learned society dedicated to English legal history. He is the author of the column 'Making History' in History Today. In succession to Richard Sharpe, he runs the project to edit the acta of William Rufus and Henry I.

== Personal life ==
Garnett has three children. His partner, Helen Pike, is the incumbent and first female Master of Magdalen College School, Oxford.

== Select publications ==
Garnett specialises in the history of England between the tenth and thirteenth centuries and has studied the impact of the Norman Conquest on kingship and land-holding in his 2007 monograph Conquered England: Kingship, Succession, and Tenure. He has subsequently studied the historiography of the Conquest, as well as late medieval early modern political writings about resistance. His publications include:

- Bartolus of Sassoferrato, Three Tracts on City Government and Related Writings, ed. & trans. with M.J. Ryan (Cambridge: Cambridge University Press 2024)
- ‘“The Logic of Authority, and the Logic of Evidence”’, in J.C. Robertson, ed., Time, History, and Political Thought (Cambridge: Cambridge University Press 2023)
- ‘England after the Conquest’, P. Cane and H. Kumarasingham, eds., Cambridge Constitutional History of the United Kingdom, 2 vols (Cambridge: Cambridge University Press 2023)
- ‘Dunstan, Edgar, and the History of Not-So-Recent Events’, in J. Barrau and D. Bates, eds., Lives, Identities, and Histories in the Central Middle Ages (Cambridge: Cambridge University Press 2021)
- The Norman Conquest in English History, vol I, A Broken Chain? (Oxford: Oxford University Press 2021; pb 2025)
- ‘Scholastic Thought in Humanist Guise: François Hotman’s Ancient French Constitution’, in P.A. Linehan, J.L. Nelson, and M. Costambeys, eds., The Medieval World, 2^{nd} edn (London 2018)
- ‘Sir Edward Coke’s Resurrection of Magna Carta and habeas corpus’, in L. Goldman, ed., Magna Carta. History, Context and Influence: Papers Delivered at Peking University on the 800^{th} Anniversary of Magna Carta (London 2018)
- "Dare Unchaperoned to Gaze": A Woman’s View of Edwardian Oxford (Oxford: St Hugh's College, Oxford, 2015)
- (with J. G. H. Hudson) "Introduction", to Sir James Holt, Magna Carta, 3rd edn (Cambridge: Cambridge University Press, 2015), pp. 1–32
- "Magna Carta through eight centuries", in Oxford Dictionary of National Biography (Oxford: Oxford University Press, 2015)
- "Coronation", in The Wiley Blackwell Encyclopedia of Anglo-Saxon England (Wiley-Blackwell, 2013)
- John Selden and the Norman Conquest (London: Selden Society, 2013)
- "Robert Curthose: the duke who lost his trousers", Anglo-Norman Studies, vol. 35 (2012), pp. 213–243
- "'The ould fields': law and history in the prefaces to Sir Edward Coke's report", Journal of Legal History, vol. 34, issue 3 (2013), pp. 244–283
- The Norman Conquest: a Very Short Introduction (Oxford: Oxford University Press 2009)
- Conquered England: Kingship, Succession and Tenure, 1066–1166 (Oxford: Oxford University Press, 2007).
- "Law in the Vindiciae, Contra Tyrannos: a vindication", The Historical Journal, vol. 49, issue 3 (2006), pp. 877–891
- Marsilius of Padua and 'the Truth of History (Oxford: Oxford University Press 2006)
- Biographies of Fulk Bairnard (d. after 1242), Henry of Braybrooke (d. 1234), Richard Malebisse (c. 1155–c. 1209), Walter of Pattishall (d. c. 1231), and Walter Ullmann (1910–1983), in Oxford Dictionary of National Biography (Oxford: Oxford University Press, 2004).
- "Introduction", in A Short History of the Papacy in the Middle Ages (Routledge, 2003), pp. x–xviii
- "The third recension of the English coronation ordo: the manuscripts", The Haskins Society Journal (2003), pp. 43–71
- "Conquered England", in The Oxford Illustrated History of Medieval England (Oxford: Oxford University Press, 2000), pp. 61–101
- "The origins of the crown", Proceedings of the British Academy, vol. 89 (1996), pp. 171–214
- (with J. Hudson) Law and Government in Medieval England and Normandy: Essays in Honour of Sir James Holt (Cambridge: Cambridge University Press, 1994)
- (Stephanius Jurius Brutus, ed. by George Garnett) Brutus: Vindiciae, Contra Tyrannos (Cambridge: Cambridge University Press, 1994)
- "Coronation and propaganda: some implications of the Norman claim to the throne of England in 1066", Transactions of the Royal Historical Society, vol. 36 (1986), pp. 91–116
- "Franci et Angli: the legal distinctions between peoples after the Conquest", Anglo-Norman Studies, vol. 8 (1985).
