= Lenehan =

Lenehan is a surname. Notable people with the name include:

- Charlie Lenehan (born 1998), British rapper
- Ciarán Lenehan, Irish Gaelic footballer
- Jim Lenehan (1938–2022), Australian rugby player
- Joseph Lenehan (1916–1981), Irish politician
- Nancy Lenehan (born 1953), American actress
- Patrick Lenehan (1898–1981), Irish boxer
- Susan Lenehan (born 1943), Australian politician

== See also ==
- Lenihan, a surname
