= Zachary Brooke (historian) =

British medieval historian (1883–1946)

Zachary Brooke FBA
- Born: Zachary Nugent Brooke; 1 December 1883
- Died: 2 October 1946 (aged 62); Cambridge, England
- Spouse: Rosa Brooke
- Children: Christopher N. L. Brooke

Academic background
- Education: St John's College, Cambridge

Academic work
- Discipline: History
- Sub-discipline: Medieval history
- Institutions: Gonville and Caius College, Cambridge

Zachary Nugent Brooke (1 December 1883 – 2 October 1946) was a British medieval historian.

== Life ==
Born on 1 December 1883, Brooke was educated at Bradfield College in Berkshire and St John's College, Cambridge. In 1908, he was elected to a Drosier Fellowship at Gonville and Caius College, University of Cambridge. He was appointed as the second Professor of Medieval History at Cambridge in 1944. He was appointed as a Fellow of the British Academy in 1940.

Brooke is buried at the Parish of the Ascension Burial Ground, off Huntingdon Road, Cambridge, with his wife Rosa Grace Brooke (1888–1964).

Brooke was the father of Christopher N. L. Brooke, who was also a medieval historian and fellow of Gonville and Caius College.

Brooke died on 7 October 1946.

== Works ==
Brooke's published works include:

- The English Church and the Papacy: From the Conquest to the Reign of John (Cambridge University Press; ISBN 0-521-36687-9)
- A History of Europe from 911 to 1198 (History of medieval and modern Europe;vol.2) (Methuen)

Academic offices
Preceded by Charles Previté-Orton	Professor of Medieval History at the University of Cambridge; 1944–1946	Succeeded by David Knowles
