= Peter Linehan =

British historian (1943–2020)

Peter Anthony Linehan, FBA (11 July 1943 – 9 July 2020) was a British historian of medieval Spain.

He was a fellow of St John's College, Cambridge, where he was Dean of Discipline, and a fellow of the British Academy.

== Life ==
Linehan was born in Mortlake, London, the son of a brokerage clerk and a teacher, and attended St Benedict's School, Ealing. He first visited Spain in 1959. He joined St John's College in 1961 as an undergraduate to study History. He remained at St John's where he became a research fellow in 1966. He completed his PhD on "Reform and reaction: the Spanish kingdoms and the Papacy in the thirteenth century", under the supervision of Walter Ullmann. This won the Thirlwall Prize and Seeley medal for 1970-1, and formed the basis for his first book, "The Spanish Church and the Papacy in the Thirteenth Century" (1971).

At St John's, Linehan served as a Tutor, Tutor for Graduate Affairs, Director of Studies in History three times, and Dean of Discipline for 11 years.

Linehan was influenced by Walter Ullmann, Christopher Cheney, Raymond Carr, Geoffrey Barraclough, and his tutor Ronald Robinson.

He became a fellow of the Royal Historical Society in 1971 and a corresponding member of the Real Academia de la Historia in 1996. He was elected a fellow of the British Academy in 2002. In 2018, he was awarded an honorary degree from the Autonomous University of Madrid.

== Personal life ==
He died in 2020 aged 76 from heart disease. He was survived by his wife and their three children.

== Books ==
- The Spanish Church and the Papacy in the Thirteenth Century (1971)
- Spanish Church and Society, 1150-1300 (1983)
- Past and Present in Medieval Spain (1992)
- History and the Historians of Medieval Spain (1993)
- The Ladies of Zamora (1997)
- The Processes of Politics and the Rule of Law (2002)
- The Mozarabic Cardinal: the life and times of Gonzalo Pérez Gudiel (2004, with Francisco J. Hernández)
- Spain 1157–1300: a partible inheritance (2008)
- St John's College, Cambridge: A History (2011)
- Historical Memory and Clerical Activity in Medieval Spain and Portugal (2012)
- Portugalia Pontificia: Materials for the history of Portugal and the Papacy 1198–1417 (2012)
- At the Edge of Reformation: Iberia before the Black Death (2019)
