= Lucas de Penna =

Lucas de Penna (Luca da Penne, Luca da Penna, Luca De Penna) (c. 1325 – c. 1390) was a fourteenth-century Neapolitan jurist and a judge of the Magna Curia at Naples.

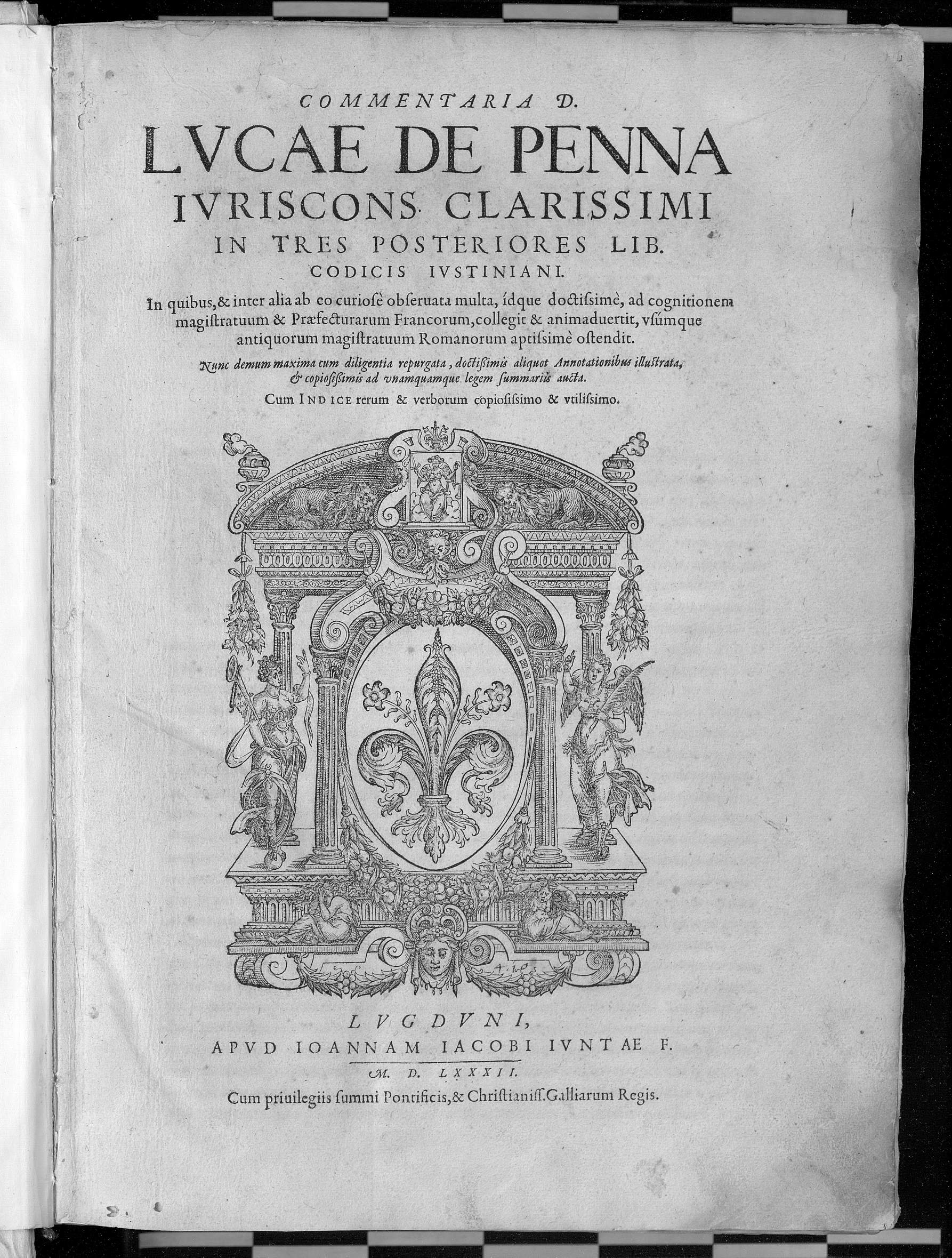
Commentaria in tres posteriores libros Codicis, 1582

He is known for his Commentaria in tres libros Codicis Justiniani imperatoris, a commentary on part of the Code of Justinian. It was printed in 1512. He also wrote a Summaria on Valerius Maximus.

== Bibliography ==
- Walter Ullmann (1946), The Medieval Idea of Law as Represented by Lucas de Penna: A Study in Fourteenth-Century Legal Scholarship
- Francesco Calasso (1932), Studi sul commento ai tre libri di Luca da Penne : la nascita e i metodi dell'opera
- Maria M. Wronowska (1925), Luca da Penne e l'opera sua
