= Faculty of History, University of Cambridge =

Department of the University of Cambridge

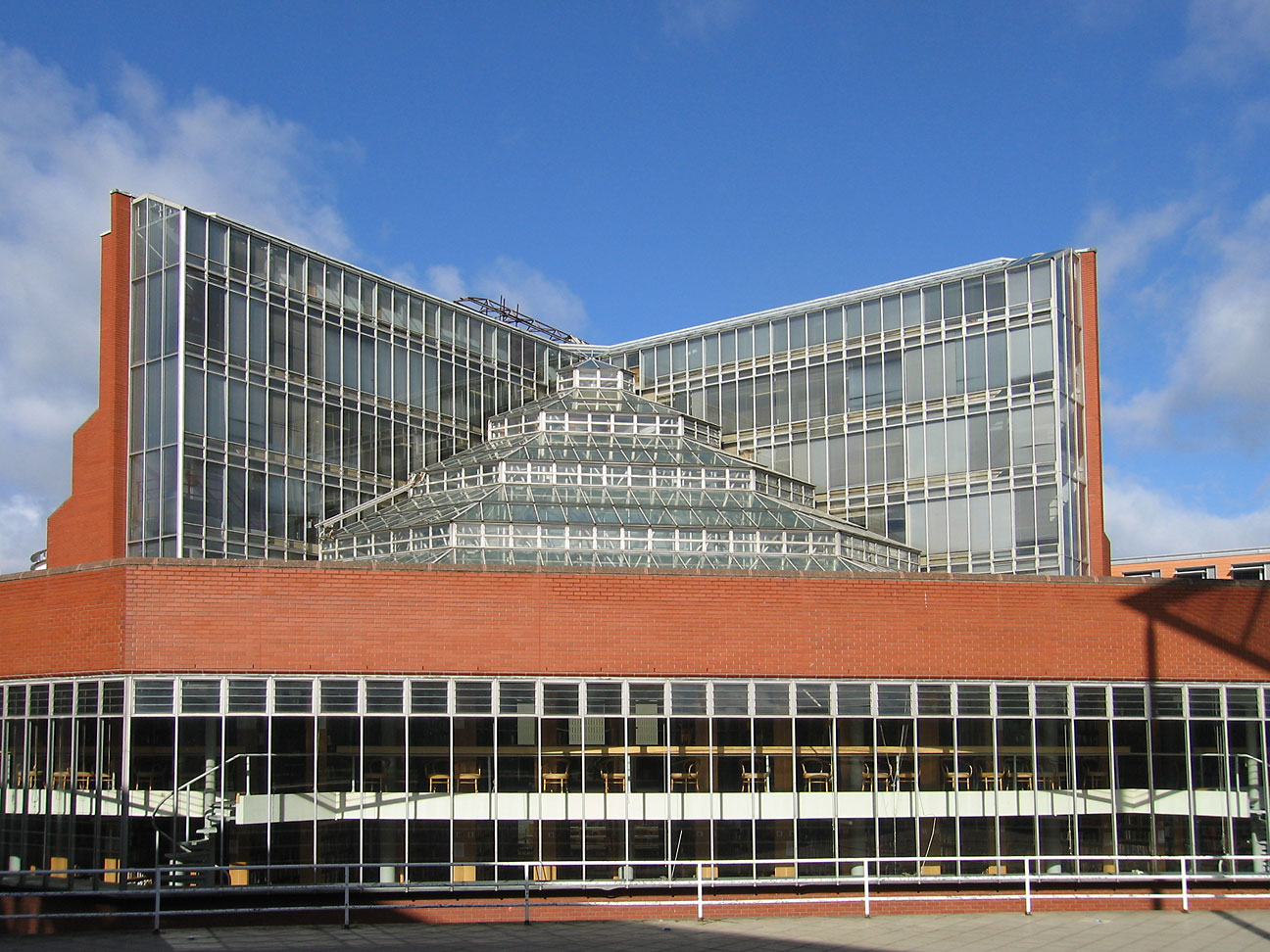
- The faculty building on the Sidgwick Site
- Type: History
- Parent institution: University of Cambridge
- Location: Cambridge, Cambridgeshire, England
- Website: www.hist.cam.ac.uk

The Faculty of History is one of the constituent departments of the University of Cambridge.

Teaching and research of history has centuries old roots at Cambridge and the first Regius Professorship of Modern History was established by King George I in 1724. The History Faculty is one of the largest history departments in the world with well over a hundred faculty members. Each academic year a new intake more than two hundred undergraduates is admitted and the Faculty also has more than 450 graduate students studying for masters degrees and the PhD. It is notable among Cambridge's faculties for the influence of its alumni in public life.

The Faculty is divided into eight subject groups (i.e. areas of research and teaching): American History; Ancient and Medieval History; Early Modern History; Economic, Social and Cultural History; Modern British History; Modern European History; Political Thought And Intellectual History; and World History.

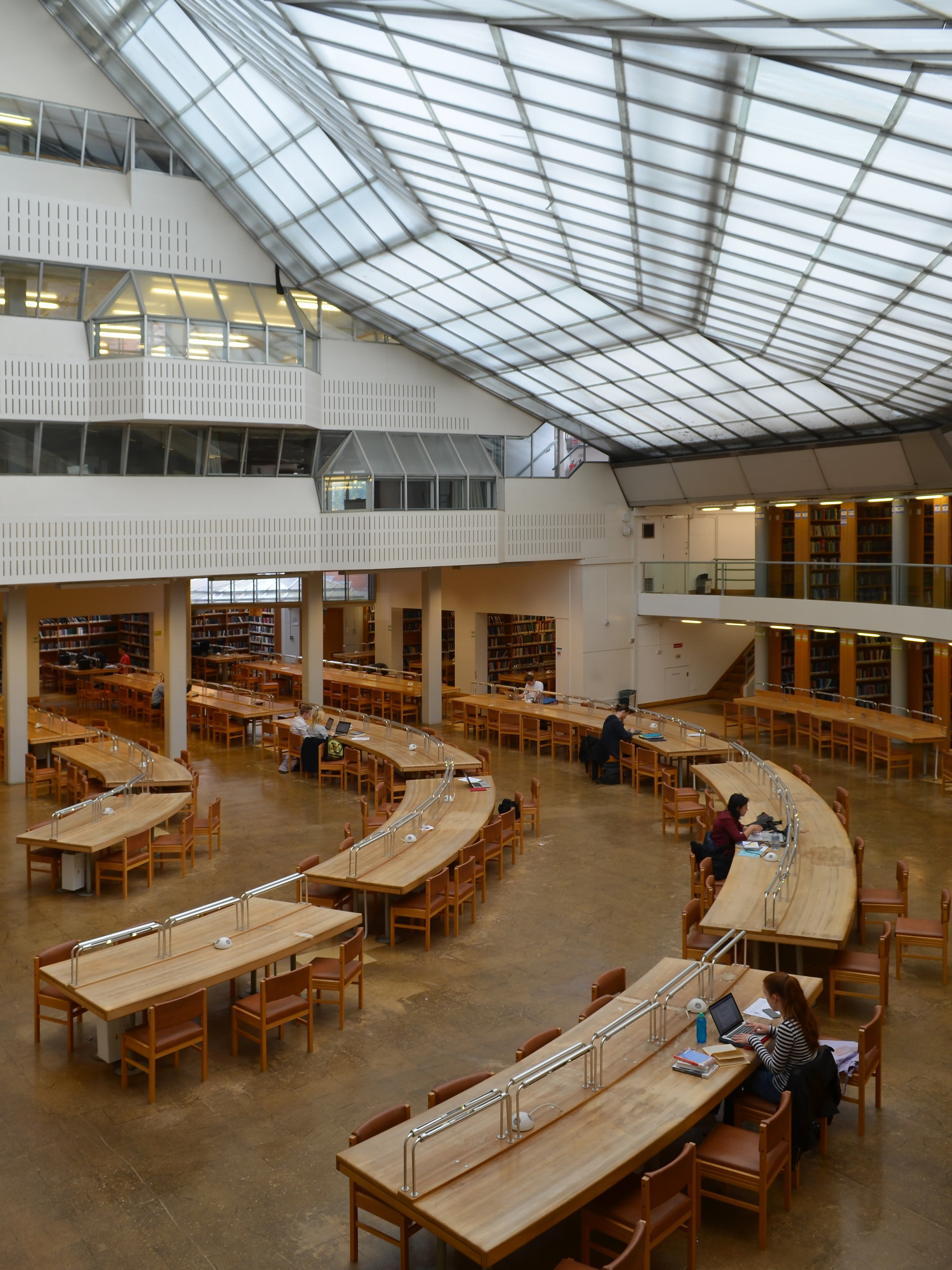
The Seeley Historical Library interior

== Courses offered ==
At undergraduate level, the faculty offers three courses (known as tripos) that result in a Bachelor of Arts (BA) degree. These are the Historical Tripos, the History and Politics Tripos, and the History and Modern Languages Tripos.

At postgraduate level, the faculty offers three types of degrees: Master of Philosophy (MPhil), Master of Studies (MSt), and Doctor of Philosophy (PhD). The MPhils are 9 month to one year courses, consisting of taught courses and a research dissertation; there are eight MPhils, one for each of the eight subject groups. The MSt is a two year part-time course, consisting of taught modules and a research dissertation: it is jointly taught by the Faculty of History and the Institute of Continuing Education. The PhD is a research course, taking 3–4 years full-time and 5–7 years part-time, and resulting in a doctoral thesis of 80,000 words.

== Notable academics ==
There are a number of professorships, including endowed chairs, within the department:

- Regius Professor of History (currently Sir Christopher Clark)
- Paul Mellon Professor of American History (currently Mia Bay)
- Professor of Medieval History (currently John H. Arnold)
- Smuts Professor of Commonwealth History (currently Saul Dubow)
- Vere Harmsworth Professor of Imperial and Naval History (currently Samita Sen)
- Dixie Professor of Ecclesiastical History (currently David Maxwell)

== See also ==
- Listed buildings in Cambridge (west)
