= Barrie Dobson =

English historian (1931–2013)

Barrie Dobson FSA FRHistS FBA
- Born: Richard Barrie Dobson; 3 November 1931; Stockton-on-Tees, England
- Died: 29 March 2013 (aged 81); York, England
- Spouse: Narda Leon (m. 1959)

Academic background
- Education: Wadham College, Oxford; Magdalen College, Oxford
- Thesis: The Priory of Durham Priory in the Time of John Wessington, Prior 1416–1446 (1962)

Academic work
- Discipline: Historian
- Sub-discipline: medieval history; Ecclesiastical history; Jewish history
- Institutions: University of St Andrews; University of York; Christ's College, Cambridge
- Main interests: Robin Hood

Richard Barrie Dobson (3 November 1931 – 29 March 2013) was an English historian who was a leading authority on the legend of Robin Hood as well as a scholar of ecclesiastical and Jewish history. He served as Professor of Medieval History at the University of Cambridge from 1988 to 1999.

== Early life ==
Dobson was born on 3 November 1931 in Stockton-on-Tees. As his father worked for the Great Western Railway of Brazil, he spent his early years in South America. The family returned to England and he spent his boyhood living in Mickleton, North Riding of Yorkshire. He was educated at Barnard Castle School, a private school in Barnard Castle, Teesdale.

Following his schooling, Dobson was called up to the British Army as part of National Service. He saw active service during the Malayan Emergency. Upon completion of his National Service, in 1951 he matriculated into Wadham College, University of Oxford, to study modern history. He graduated with a first-class Bachelor of Arts (BA) degree. He then joined Magdalen College, Oxford, where he completed a Doctor of Philosophy (DPhil) degree. His thesis was titled The Priory of Durham Priory in the Time of John Wessington, Prior 1416–1446 and was completed in 1962.

== Academic career ==
Dobson lectured in medieval history at the University of St Andrews from 1958 to 1964. He then joined the University of York as a history lecturer in 1964. He rose through the ranks in his department becoming a reader and then Professor of History in 1977. In 1984, he was appointed deputy vice-chancellor and thereby becoming the second most senior academic of the university. In 1988, he moved to the University of Cambridge to take up the post of Professor of Medieval History. He also became a fellow of Christ's College.

Dobson also held a number of senior positions outside of university. He was president of the Surtees Society from 1987 to 2002, president of the Jewish Historical Society of England from 1990 to 1991 and of the Ecclesiastical History Society from 1991 to 1992. He was one of the founding members of the York Archaeological Trust in 1972. From 1990 to 1996, he was the trust's chairman.

== Later life ==
Dobson died on 29 March 2013 at his home in York aged 81 years. His funeral service was held at the York Unitarian Chapel on 16 April.

== Personal life ==
Dobson married Narda Leon in 1959. They had met at the University of Oxford while they were both studying there. They had two children.

== Honours ==
Dobson was elected to the fellowship of a number of learned societies: the Royal Historical Society in 1972, the Society of Antiquaries in 1979, and the British Academy in 1988.

== Works ==
- Durham Priory, 1400-1450 (1973)
- The Peasants' Revolt of 1381 (1970)
- The Jews of Medieval York and the Massacre of March 1190 (1974)
- Rymes of Robyn Hood: An Introduction to the English Outlaw (with John Taylor) (1976)
- The Church, Politics and Patronage in the Fifteenth Century (1984)
- Preserving the perishable (1991)
- Clifford's Tower and the Jews of Medieval York (1995)
- Church and Society in the Medieval North of England (1996)
- "The Northern Provinces in the Later Middle Ages", Northern History, xlii, 51. (2005)
- The Jewish Communities of Medieval England (2010)

Academic offices
Preceded by J. C. Holt	Professor of Medieval History at the University of Cambridge; 1988–1999	Succeeded by Rosamond McKitterick
Professional and academic associations
Preceded by Hilary Seton Offler	President of the Surtees Society; 1987–2002	Succeeded by Richard Sharpe
Preceded by Clyde Binfield	President of the Ecclesiastical History Society; 1991–1992	Succeeded by David Loades
