= Edwin Lineham =

English cricketer

Personal information
- Full name: Edwin Lineham
- Born: 28 April 1879; Portsmouth, Hampshire, England
- Died: 12 August 1949 (aged 70); Portsmouth, Hampshire, England
- Batting: Unknown

Domestic team information
- Years: Team
- 1898: Hampshire

Career statistics
Competition	First-class
Matches	1
Runs scored	0
Batting average	0.00
100s/50s	–/–
Top score	0*
Catches/stumpings	–/–
- Source: Cricinfo, 14 January 2010

Edwin Lineham (28 April 1879 — 12 August 1949) was an English first-class cricketer.

Lineham was born in the Landport district of Portsmouth in April 1879. He made a single appearance in first-class cricket for Hampshire against Lancashire at Old Trafford in the 1898 County Championship. Batting twice in the match, he was dismissed without scoring by Johnny Briggs in Hampshire's first innings, while in their second innings he was promoted from the middle order to open the batting alongside Ledger Hill, but ended Hampshire's brief one over innings unbeaten without scoring. Lineham died in Fratton, Portsmouth aged 70.
