= Donald Lynam =

American psychologist (born 1967)

- Born: April 5, 1967 (age 59)
- Education: University of Wisconsin (Ph.D., 1995)
- Awards: 2002 Distinguished Scientific Early Career Contributions to Psychology Award from the American Psychological Association, 2013 Research Achievement Award from the Purdue University College of Health and Human Sciences
- Scientific career
- Fields: Psychology
- Workplaces: University of Kentucky, Purdue University
- Thesis: The early identification of chronic offenders: Who is the fledgling psychopath? (1995)
- Doctoral advisor: Terrie Moffitt
- Doctoral students: Joshua Miller

Donald Ray Lynam, Jr. (born April 5, 1967) is an American psychologist and distinguished professor of clinical psychology at Purdue University's College of Health and Human Sciences. He is also the director of Purdue's Developmental Psychopathology, Psychopathy and Personality Lab. He previously taught at the University of Kentucky, where he won the American Psychological Association's Distinguished Scientific Early Career Contributions to Psychology Award in 2002. He has been conducting research on psychopathy for over two decades.
