= Kwik-Fit (GB) Ltd v Lineham =

- Court: Employment Appeal Tribunal
- Citation: [1992] ICR 183

Keywords
- Unfair dismissal

Kwik-Fit (GB) Ltd v Lineham [1992] ICR 183 is a UK labour law case, concerning unfair dismissal, now governed by the Employment Rights Act 1996.

== Facts ==
On returning from the pub, an employee Mr Lineham used the toilet after hours at the depot where he worked. The employer publicly rebuked him, and gave him a final written warning. Lineham threw down his keys and drove off and phoned the company the day after, asked for his wages and told Mr Kattner, the boss, he was going to tribunal.

== Judgment ==
Wood J held that the employer was not entitled to assume that the phone call was a resignation. He stated that the employer should accept a resignation within a reasonable time, but this was not that.

== See also ==
- UK labour law
