= Walter Ullmann =

Austrian-Jewish scholar (1910–1983)

Walter Ullmann FBA
- Born: 29 November 1910; Pulkau, Austria
- Died: 18 January 1983 (aged 72); Cambridge, England

Academic background
- Education: University of Innsbruck

Academic work
- Era: 20th century
- Discipline: History
- Institutions: University of Leeds; Trinity College, Cambridge
- Doctoral students: George Garnett; Rosamond McKitterick; Janet Nelson
- Main interests: Medieval civil law and canon law

Walter Ullmann FBA (29 November 1910 – 18 January 1983) was an Austrian-Jewish scholar who left Austria in the 1930s and settled in the United Kingdom, where he became a naturalised citizen. He was a recognised authority on medieval political thought, and in particular legal theory, an area in which he published prolifically.

== Life ==
Ullmann was the son of a doctor. He attended the classical languages school in Horn and studied law at Vienna and Innsbruck. Having a non-Aryan grandfather made it dangerous for him to remain in Austria, so he left for England in 1939 and took up a position at Ratcliffe College, a Roman Catholic boarding school in Leicestershire.

In 1940 he enlisted. He served for three years, first in the Royal Pioneer Corps and then in the Royal Engineers, before being discharged due to ill health.

After the war he had positions at the University of Leeds, and then from 1949 at the University of Cambridge, becoming a Fellow of Trinity College, Cambridge. He became Professor of Medieval History at Cambridge in 1972, retiring in 1978. He was President of the Ecclesiastical History Society (1969–70).

Notable people who studied under Ullmann include Brian Tierney (medievalist), Quentin Skinner, Janet Nelson, and Rosamond McKitterick.

Ullmann principally concerned himself with the history of thought in the mediaeval period and the history of the papacy in the Middle Ages. His most successful book was The Growth of Papal Government in the Middle Ages, which deals with the relationship between secular and ecclesiastical power in medieval times. Innsbruck University awarded him an honorary doctorate in political science.

Ullmann has been credited with "historicizing the concept of the political" in a manner that is relevant for several subfields of the humanities and social sciences. In an entry for Oxford Bibliographies Online, Thomas F. X. Noble and Atria Larson called his study A Short History of the Papacy in the Middle Ages "perhaps the best single-volume history" on the Papacy in the Middle Ages.

== Works ==
- The Medieval Idea of Law as Represented by Lucas de Penna: A Study in Fourteenth-Century Legal Scholarship. (1946) introduction by Harold Dexter Hazeltine
- Medieval Papalism. The Political Theories of the Medieval Canonists (1949) 1948 Maitland Lectures
- The Growth of Papal Government in the Middle Ages: A study in the ideological relation of clerical to lay power (1955)
- The Medieval Papacy, St Thomas and Beyond (1960) The Aquinas Society of London, Aquinas Paper No. 35:
- Liber Regie Capelle: A Manuscript in the Bibliotheca Publica, Evora (1961)
- A History of Political Thought: The Middle Ages (1965). Republished as Medieval Political Thought (1972)
- The Relevance of Medieval Ecclesiastical History: An Inaugural Lecture ( (1966)
- The Individual and Society in the Middle Ages (1966)
- Principles of Government and Politics in the Middle Ages (1966). Traducción española: Principios de Gobierno y Política en la Edad Media. Madrid, Revista de Occidente, 1971. Traducción de Graciela Soriano. Depósito Legal: M. 5.727–1971. Conclusiones fundamentales del estudio de Walter Ullmann
- The Carolingian Renaissance and the Idea of Kingship (1969) The Birkbeck Lectures 1968-9
- A Short History of the Papacy in the Middle Ages (1972)
- Origins of the Great Schism: A Study in fourteenth-century Ecclesiastical History (1972)
- The Future of Medieval History: An Inaugural Lecture.(1973)
- Law and Politics in the Middle Ages. An Introduction to the Sources of Medieval Political Ideas (1975)
- The Church and the Law in the Earlier Middle Ages: Selected Essays (1975)
- Medieval Foundations of Renaissance Humanism (1977)
- Law and Jurisdiction in the Middle Ages (1988)

== Literature ==
- Brian Tierney and Peter Linehan (eds.), Authority and Power: Studies on Medieval Law and Government Presented to Walter Ullmann on his seventieth birthday (Cambridge University Press, 1980).
- Raoul C. Van Caenegem, "Legal historians I have known: A personal memoir", Rechtsgeschichte, Zeitschrift des Max-Planck Instituts für europäische Rechtsgeschichte, 2010, pp. 252–299.

Academic offices
Preceded by C. R. Cheney	Professor of Medieval History at the University of Cambridge; 1972–1978	Succeeded by J. C. Holt
Professional and academic associations
Preceded by Christopher N. L. Brooke	President of the Ecclesiastical History Society; 1969–1970	Succeeded by W. R. Ward
