= C. R. Cheney =

English medieval historian (1906–1987)

Professor C. R. Cheney CBE FRHistS FBA
- Born: Christopher Robert Cheney; 20 December 1906; Banbury, England
- Died: 19 June 1987 (aged 80); Cambridge, England
- Spouse: Mary Gwendolen Hall (m. 1940)
- Children: 3

Academic background
- Education: Banbury County School
- Alma mater: Wadham College, Oxford
- Influences: F. M. Powicke

Academic work
- Discipline: History
- Sub-discipline: Medieval English ecclesiastical history
- Institutions: University of Manchester; Magdalen College, Oxford; Corpus Christi College, Cambridge

Christopher Robert Cheney (20 December 1906 – 19 June 1987) was an English medieval historian, noted for his work on the medieval English church and the relations of the papacy with England, particularly in the age of Pope Innocent III.

== Background ==
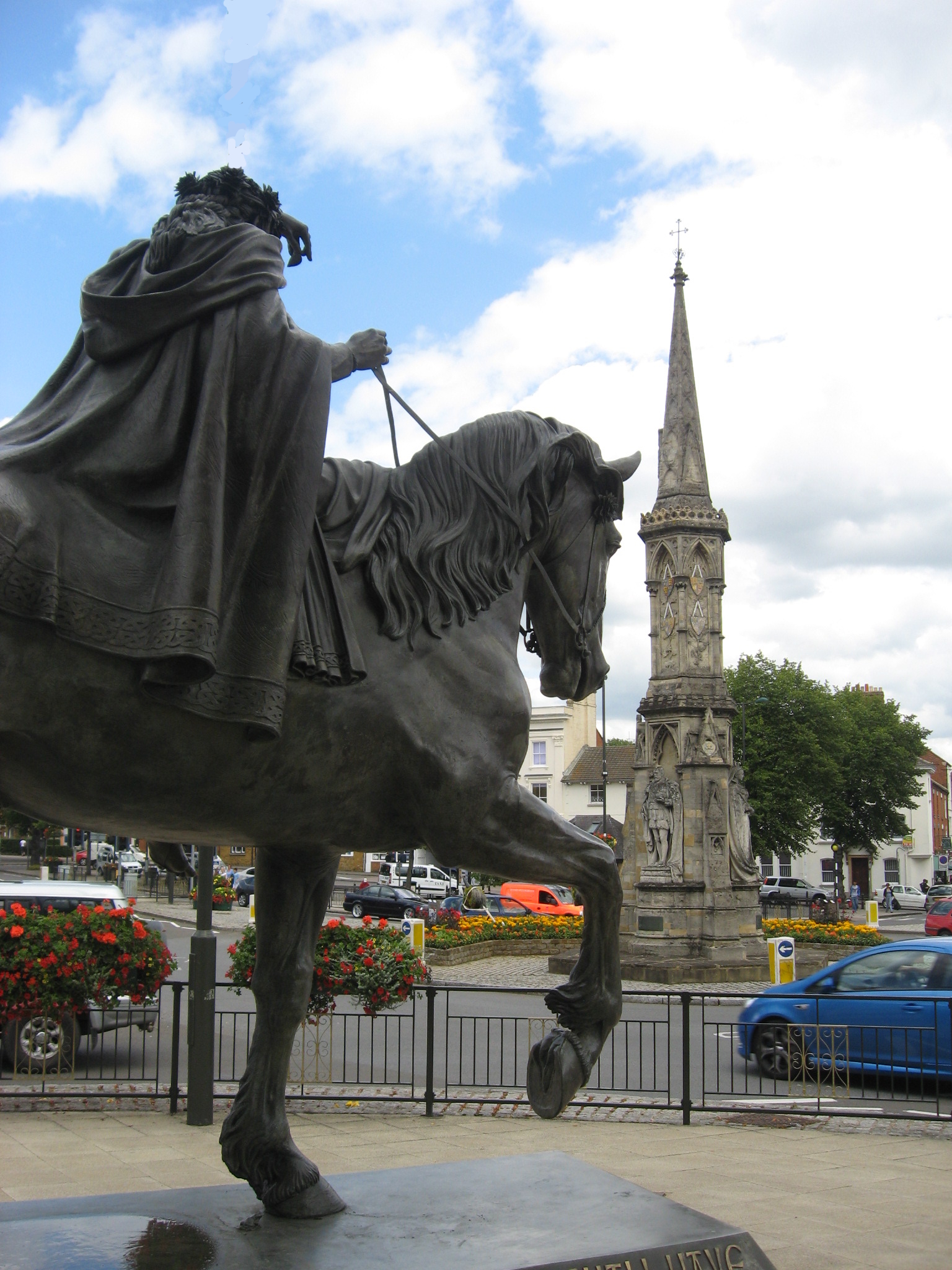
The Fine Lady and Banbury Cross

Cheney was born on 20 December 1906 in Banbury, Oxfordshire, the fourth and youngest son born to his parents George Gardner Cheney and Christina Stapleton Cheney (nee Bateman).

The family's printing company, Cheney and Sons, was founded by an ancestor, John Cheney, in 1767. Later, Christopher collaborated with elder brothers John Cheney (b.1900) and Walter Gardener Cheney (b.1901) on writing histories of the firm, the first in 1936 and a second to celebrate its bicentenary in 1967. He was educated at Banbury County School and Wadham College, Oxford, where he graduated with first-class honours in 1928.

== Career ==
Victoria University of Manchester

Cheney lectured at the University of Cairo, as Assistant Lecturer at University College, London (1931–1933), and then Bishop Fraser Lecturer in Ecclesiastical History University of Manchester (1933–1937) before returning to the Oxford in 1937 as reader in diplomatic and fellow of Magdalen College from 1938. He married Mary Gwendolen Hall on 24 August 1940.

After war service with MI5, Cheney took the chair in medieval history at Manchester in 1945 and was elected a Member of Manchester Literary and Philosophical Society in 1946 while living in Withington, Manchester. During this time, he was involved in the Manchester Branch of the Historical Association, was a Feoffee of Chetham's School and served as President of the Lancashire Parish Register Society from 1946 to 1955. He was a Member of the Canterbury and York Society serving as Treasurer (1942–61) then President (1961–8).

Corpus Christi College, Cambridge

Cheney remained at Manchester until he was elected Professor of Medieval History at the University of Cambridge in 1955. He was invited to deliver the Ford Lectures at the University of Oxford in 1956. He remained at Cambridge as a fellow of Corpus Christi College until his retirement in 1972. He was elected an Honorary Fellow of Wadham College, Oxford in 1968.

Cheney was elected a Fellow of the Royal Historical Society and served as the society's Joint Literary Director from 1938 until 1945. He was a Corresponding Fellow of the Medieval Academy of America and Corresponding Member of the Monumenta Germaniae Historica. He was elected a Fellow of the British Academy in 1951 and appointed CBE in 1984. He was awarded the honorary degree of Doctor of Letters by the University of Glasgow in 1970 and the University of Manchester in 1978. He died in Cambridge on 19 June 1987. Mary Gwendolen Cheney died at the age of 90 in 2007.

== Select Publications ==
- Cheney, C.R. (1931), Episcopal Visitation of Monasteries in the Thirteenth Century, Publications of the University of Manchester, Historical Series, vol. 58, Manchester: Manchester University Press, ISBN 978-0719007484 [revised edition 1983]
- Cheney, J.; Cheney, W.G.; Cheney, C.R. (1936), John Cheney and his Descendants, Printers in Banbury since 1767, Banbury: Cheney and Sons.
- Cheney, C.R. (1941), English Synodalia of the Thirteenth Century, Oxford: Oxford University Press, ISBN 978-0198213963
- Cheney, C.R. (1945), Handbook of Dates for Students of English History, Royal Historical Society, Guides and Handbooks, vol. 4, London: Royal Historical Society, ISBN 978-0521778459 [and many later editions]
- Cheney, C.R. (1950), English Bishops' Chanceries, 1100–1250, University of Manchester Faculty of Arts Publications, vol. 3, Manchester: Manchester University Press
- Cheney, C.R.; Semple, W.H., eds. (1953), Selected Letters of Pope Innocent III concerning England (1198–1216), Medieval Texts series, London: Nelson
- Cheney, C.R. (1956), The Records of Medieval England: an inaugural lecture, Cambridge
- Cheney, C.R. (1956), From Becket to Langton: English church government, 1170–1213, Ford Lectures, Hilary Term 1955, Manchester
- Cheney, C.R.; Powicke, F.M., eds. (1964), Councils and Synods with other Documents Relating to the English Church, A.D.1205-1313: Volume II: Part 1: 1205–1265, Oxford: Clarendon Press.
- Cheney, C.R.; Powicke, F.M., eds. (1964), Councils and Synods with other Documents Relating to the English Church, A.D.1205-1313: Volume II: Part 2: 1265–1313, Oxford: Clarendon Press.
- Cheney, C.R. (1967), Hubert Walter, Leaders of Religion, London: Nelson
- Cheney, J.; Cheney, W.G.; Cheney, C.R. (1967), Cheneys of Banbury, 1767–1967: The Autobiography of a Printer, Banbury: Cheney and Sons.
- Cheney, C.R.; Cheney, M.G., eds. (1967), Letters of Pope Innocent III concerning England and Wales, Oxford: Clarendon Press.
- Cheney, C.R. (1972), Notaries Public in England in the Thirteenth and Fourteenth Centuries, Oxford: Clarendon Press, ISBN 978-0198223528
- Cheney, C.R. (1973), Medieval Texts and Studies, Oxford: Oxford University Press, ISBN 9780198223993.
- Cheney, C.R. (1976), Pope Innocent III and England, Päpste und Papsttum, vol. 9, Stuttgart: Anton Hiersmann, ISBN 978-3777276236
- Cheney, C.R.; Cheney, M.G., eds. (1979), Studies in the Collections of Twelfth-century Decretals: From the Papers of the late Walther Holtzmann, Monumenta Iuris Canonici, Series B: Corpus Collectionum, Volume 3, Vatican City: Biblioteca Apostolica Vaticana.
- Cheney, C.R. (1982), The Papacy and England, 12th to 14th Centuries: Historical and legal studies, Collected Studies Series, vol. 154, London: Variorum Reprints, ISBN 9780860780991
- Cheney, C.R. (1982), The English Church and its Laws, 12th–14th centuries, Collected Studies Series, vol. 160, London: Variorum Reprints, ISBN 0860781089
- Cheney, C.R.; Jones, B.E.A., eds. (1986), English Episcopal Acta II: Canterbury 1162–1190, English Episcopal Acta, vol. 2, Oxford: Oxford University Press, ISBN 9780197261040.
- Cheney, C.R.; John, E., eds. (1986), English Episcopal Acta III: Canterbury 1193–1205, English Episcopal Acta, vol. 3, Oxford: Oxford University Press, ISBN 9780197261040.

Academic offices
Preceded by David Knowles	Professor of Medieval History at the University of Cambridge; 1955–1972	Succeeded by Walter Ullmann
Professional and academic associations
Preceded by	President of the Canterbury and York Society; 1961–68	Succeeded by
Preceded by	Treasurer of the Canterbury and York Society; 1942–61	Succeeded by
Preceded by Ernest Fraser Jacob	President of the Lancashire Parish Register Society; 1946–55	Succeeded by John Michael Wallace-Hadrill
