= Linehan =

Linehan is a surname of Irish origin, and may refer to:

== Arts and entertainment ==
- Brian Linehan (1943–2004), Canadian television host
- Graham Linehan (born 1968), Irish television writer and director
- John Linehan (entertainer) (born 1952), Northern Irish entertainer
- Maxine Linehan, Irish singer and actress
- Rosaleen Linehan (born 1937), veteran stage and screen actress

== Government and politics ==
- Lou Ann Linehan (born 1955), American politician from Nebraska
- Neil J. Linehan (1895–1967), American politician

== Sport ==
- Alfie Linehan (born 1940), Irish cricketer
- Anne Linehan (born 1973), Irish cricketer
- John Linehan (basketball) (born 1978), American basketball player and coach
- Kim Linehan, USA Olympic swimmer (from the 1984 Games)

== Other fields ==
- Marsha M. Linehan (1943–2026), American psychologist and author
- Mechele Linehan (born 1972), figure in the death of Kent Leppink
- Peter Linehan (1943–2020), British medievalist
- Scott Linehan (born 1963), American football coach

== See also ==
- Lineham, a surname (with a list of people of this name)
