= David Knowles (scholar) =

English Benedictine monk and historian (1896–1974)

Dom David Knowles OSB FRHistS
- Knowles in 1965
- Born: Michael Clive Knowles; 29 September 1896; Studley, Warwickshire, England
- Died: 21 November 1974 (aged 78)
- Other name: Michael David Knowles

Academic background
- Education: Christ's College, Cambridge

Academic work
- Discipline: History
- Institutions: Peterhouse, Cambridge
- Doctoral students: Henry J. Blumenthal; David Luscombe
- Main interests: English monasticism
- Notable works: The Monastic Order in England (1940); Religious Orders in England (1948–59); The Evolution of Medieval Thought (1962; 1988)

Michael David Knowles, OSB (born Michael Clive Knowles ; 29 September 1896 – 21 November 1974) was an English Benedictine monk, Catholic priest and historian who became Regius Professor of History at the University of Cambridge from 1954 to 1963.

== Biography ==
Born Michael Clive Knowles on 29 September 1896 in Studley, Warwickshire, England, Knowles was educated at Downside School, run by the monks of Downside Abbey, and Christ's College, Cambridge, where he took a first in both philosophy and classics.

=== Monk ===
In July 1914 Knowles finished at Downside School and immediately moved into the monastery. He was clothed in the September and became a member of the monastic community, being given the religious name of David, by which he was always known thereafter. After completing the novitiate he was sent by the abbot to the Pontifical Athenaeum of St. Anselm in Rome for his theological studies. Returning to Downside, he was ordained a priest in 1922. His research into the early monastic history of England was assisted by the library built up at Downside by Dom Raymund Webster.

Dom David Knowles became the leader of a faction of the younger monks of the abbey who wanted to resist the growing demands of the school on the pattern of monastic life at the abbey. They advocated a more contemplative life as the goal of their lives as monks. This effort led to a period of major conflict within the community and he was transferred to Ealing Abbey, another teaching establishment, where he lived 1933–1940.

=== Academic at Cambridge ===
In 1944 Knowles was elected into a research fellowship in medieval studies at Peterhouse in the University of Cambridge, where he would remain for the duration of his academic career.

In 1947 he was appointed as Professor of Medieval History and then, in 1954, he became the Regius Professor of Modern History, a post he held until his retirement in 1963.

He served as president of the Royal Historical Society from 1957 to 1961; and was the first President of the Ecclesiastical History Society (1961–63).

While pursuing his academic life at Cambridge, Knowles was eventually, at the instigation of Abbot Christopher Butler, exclaustrated from Downside Abbey and finally released from his vows. Before his death on 21 November 1974 from a heart attack, however, he was readmitted to the order.

Knowles is best known for his history of early English monasticism, The Monastic Order in England: A History of Its Development from the Times of St. Dunstan to the Fourth Lateran Council, 940–1216 (1940). His three-volume work, The Religious Orders in England (1948–1959), is also highly regarded by scholars in English medieval ecclesiastical history. In 1962 he published a textbook, The Evolution of Medieval Thought (2nd ed. 1988), that "dominated medieval history courses in U.S. colleges for a quarter of a century". He has been criticised for excluding nunneries from consideration in Medieval Religious Houses on the grounds that there was insufficient evidence to draw on (a lack remedied in more recent scholarship).

== Published works ==
- The American Civil War: A Brief Sketch (1926)
- The Monastic Order in England: A History of Its Development from the Times of St Dunstan to the Fourth Lateran Council, 943–1216 (1940, 2nd ed. 1963)
- The Religious Houses of Medieval England (1940)
- The Prospects of Medieval Studies (1947)
- The Religious Orders in England (three volumes, forming a continuation after 1216 AD of The Monastic Order in England) (1948–59)
- Archbishop Thomas Becket: A Character Study (1949)
- Monastic Constitutions of Lanfranc (1951) translator
- Episcopal Colleagues of Archbishop Thomas Becket (1951) Ford Lectures 1949
- Monastic Sites From The Air (1952) with J. S. K. St. Joseph
- Medieval Religious Houses: England and Wales, with R. Neville Hadcock (1953, 2nd ed. 1971)
- The Historian and Character (1954) Inaugural Lecture
- Charterhouse: The Medieval Foundation in the Light of Recent Discoveries (1954) with W. F. Grimes
- Cardinal Gasquet as an Historian (1957)
- The English Mystical Tradition (1961)
- The Evolution of Medieval Thought (1962)
- Saints and Scholars: Twenty-Five Medieval Portraits (1962)
- The Benedictines: A Digest for Moderns (1962)
- Great Historical Enterprises; Problems in Monastic History (1963)
- The Historian and Character and Other Essays (1963) with others, presentation volume
- Lord Macaulay, 1800–1859 (1963)
- From Pachomius to Ignatius: A Study in the Constitutional History of the Religious Orders (1966)
- The Nature of Mysticism (1966)
- What is Mysticism? (1967)
- Authority (1969)
- Christian Monasticism (1969)
- The Christian Centuries: The Middle Ages, volume 2 (1969) with Dimitri Obolensky
- The Heads of Religious Houses: England and Wales, 940–1216 (1972) with Christopher N. L. Brooke, Vera C. M. London
- Bare Ruined Choirs: The Dissolution of the English Monasteries (1976) ISBN 9780521207126
- Thomas Becket, Leaders of Religion, (1971, 1977) ISBN 9780804707664

Academic offices
Preceded by Zachary Brooke	Professor of Medieval History at the University of Cambridge; 1947–1954	Succeeded by C. R. Cheney
Preceded by J. R. M. Butler	Regius Professor of Modern History at the University of Cambridge; 1954–1968	Succeeded by Sir Herbert Butterfield
Professional and academic associations
Preceded by Hugh Hale Bellot	President of the Royal Historical Society; 1957–1961	Succeeded by Sir Goronwy Edwards
New office	President of the Ecclesiastical History Society; 1961–1963	Succeeded by C. W. Dugmore
