= Professor of Medieval History (Cambridge) =

The Professorship of Medieval History is a professorship in medieval history at the University of Cambridge. It was founded on 1 May 1937.

The professorship is assigned to the Faculty of History.

== List of Professors of Medieval History ==
The following have held the chair:

- 1937–1942: Charles William Previté-Orton
- 1944–1946: Zachary Nugent Brooke
- 1947–1954: David Knowles
- 1955–1972: Christopher Robert Cheney
- 1972–1978: Walter Ullmann
- 1978–1988: James Clarke Holt
- 1988–1999: Richard Barrie Dobson
- 1999–2016: Rosamond McKitterick
- 2016–present: John H. Arnold
