= Lyneham =

Lyneham may refer to:

- Lyneham, Australian Capital Territory, a suburb of Canberra, Australia
  - Lyneham High School
- Lyneham, Oxfordshire, a village and civil parish in England
- Lyneham, Wiltshire, a village in England
  - RAF Lyneham, former Royal Air Force base
- Lyneham, Yealmpton, an historic estate in Devon, England
