= John H. Arnold (historian) =

British historian

- Born: John Hugh Arnold; 28 November 1969 (age 56)

Academic background
- Education: University of York (BA, PhD)

Academic work
- Discipline: History
- Sub-discipline: Medieval history; historiography
- Institutions: University of East Anglia; Birbeck College, London; King's College, Cambridge
- Main interests: Medieval religious culture

John Hugh Arnold (born 28 November 1969) is a British historian. Since 2016, he has been the Professor of Medieval History at the University of Cambridge. He previously worked at Birkbeck College, University of London, where he specialised in the study of medieval religious culture. He has also written widely on historiography and why history matters.

== Career ==
Born 28 November 1969, Arnold received his Bachelor of Arts degree in history and his Doctor of Philosophy degree in medieval studies from the University of York. He was professor of medieval history at Birkbeck College, University of London, from 2008. He joined the college as a lecturer in 2001. Before that he was a lecturer at the University of East Anglia. He is a member of the Social History Society and the Medieval Academy of America.

== Research ==
Arnold specialises in the study of medieval religious culture, saying that while he has never been a believer in any religion, "belief" has always fascinated him. In his work he asks "Why do people believe the things they believe? What does 'believing' really mean in practice?" Arnold has also written widely about historiography. In 2008 he wrote a policy paper, Why history matters - and why medieval history also matters, for History & Policy.

== Selected publications ==
- What is Masculinity? Historical Dynamics from Antiquity to the Contemporary World (Palgrave, 2011), co-edited with Sean Brady
- What is Medieval History? (Polity, 2008)
- Belief and Unbelief in Medieval Europe (Bloomsbury, 2005)
- A Companion to the Book of Margery Kempe (Boydell, 2004), co-edited with Katherine J Lewis
- Inquisition and Power: Catharism and the Confessing Subject in Medieval Languedoc (University of Pennsylvania Press, 2001)
- History: A Very Short Introduction (Oxford, 2000)
