= Oxford Illustrated Histories =

Non-fiction book series

The Oxford Illustrated Histories are a series of single-volume history books written by experts and published by the Oxford University Press. According to Hew Strachan, its intended readership is the 'intelligent general reader' rather than the research student.

== Titles ==
- Shaw, Ian, ed. (2002). The Oxford Illustrated History of Ancient Egypt. ISBN 9780192802934.
- Rogerson, John, ed. (2001). The Oxford Illustrated History of the Bible. Oxford University Press. ISBN 0-19-860118-2.
- Raven, James, ed. (2020). The Oxford Illustrated History of the Book. ISBN 9780198702986.
- Morgan, Kenneth O., ed. (1984). The Oxford Illustrated History of Britain. ISBN 0-19-822684-5.
- Chandler, David, ed. (1994). The Oxford Illustrated History of the British Army. ISBN 0-19-869178-5.
- Cannon, John; Griffiths, Ralph (1988). The Oxford Illustrated History of the British Monarchy. Oxford University Press. ISBN 0-19-822786-8.
- McManners, John, ed. (1990). The Oxford Illustrated History of Christianity. ISBN 0-19-285259-0.
- Boardman, John, ed. (1993). The Oxford Illustrated History of Classical Art. ISBN 0-19-814386-9.
- Riley-Smith, Jonathan, ed. (1995). The Oxford Illustrated History of the Crusades. ISBN 0-19-285428-3.
- Rogers, Pat, ed. (1987). The Oxford Illustrated History of English Literature. ISBN 0-19-812816-9.
- Strachan, Hew, ed. (1998). The Oxford Illustrated History of the First World War. ISBN 0-19-289325-4.
- Boardman, John; Griffin, Jasper; Murray, Oswyn, eds. (2001). The Oxford Illustrated History of Greece and the Hellenistic World. ISBN 0-19-285438-0.
- Williamson, H. G. M.; Hoyland, Robert G., eds. (2018). The Oxford Illustrated History of the Holy Land. ISBN 9780198724391.
- Foster, R. F., ed. (1989). The Oxford Illustrated History of Ireland. ISBN 0-19-822970-4.
- Holmes, George, ed. (1997). The Oxford Illustrated History of Italy. Oxford University Press. ISBN 0-19-820527-9.
- Saul, Nigel, ed. (1997). The Oxford Illustrated History of Medieval England. ISBN 0-19-820502-3.
- Holmes, George, ed. (1988). The Oxford Illustrated History of Medieval Europe. ISBN 0-19-820073-0.
- Wasserstrom, Jeffrey N., ed. (2016). The Oxford Illustrated History of Modern China. ISBN 9780199683758.
- Blanning, T. C. W., ed. (1996). The Oxford Illustrated History of Modern Europe. ISBN 0-19-285348-1.
- Townshend, Charles, ed. (1997). The Oxford Illustrated History of Modern War. ISBN 0-19-820427-2.
- Sinclair, Keith, ed. (1990). The Oxford Illustrated History of New Zealand. ISBN 0-19-558209-8.
- Parker, Roger, ed. (1994). The Oxford Illustrated History of Opera. ISBN 0-19-816282-0.
- Cunliffe, Barry, ed. (2001). The Oxford Illustrated History of Prehistoric Europe. ISBN 9780192854414.
- Marshall, Peter, ed. (2015). The Oxford Illustrated History of the Reformation. ISBN 978-0-19-959548-8.
- Campbell, Gordon, ed. (2021). The Oxford Illustrated History of the Renaissance. ISBN 9780198862666.
- Salway, Peter (1993). The Oxford Illustrated History of Roman Britain. Oxford University Press. ISBN 0-19-822984-4.
- Boardman, John; Griffin, Jasper; Murray, Oswyn, eds. (1988). The Oxford Illustrated History of the Roman World. ISBN 0-19-285436-4.
- Hill, J. R., ed. (1995). The Oxford Illustrated History of the Royal Navy. ISBN 0-19-211675-4.
- Morus, Iwan Rhys, ed. (2017). The Oxford Illustrated History of Science. ISBN 978-0-19-966327-9.
- Bate, Jonathan; Jackson, Russell, eds. (1996). The Oxford Illustrated History of Shakespeare on Stage. Oxford University Press. ISBN 0-19-280213-5.
- Brown, John Russell, ed. (2001). The Oxford Illustrated History of Theatre. ISBN 0-19-212997X.
- Gellately, Robert, ed. (2018). The Oxford Illustrated History of the Third Reich. ISBN 9780198728283.
- Morrill, John, ed. (1996). The Oxford Illustrated History of Tudor & Stuart Britain. ISBN 0-19-820325-X.
- Sawyer, Peter, ed. (1997). The Oxford Illustrated History of the Vikings. ISBN 0-19-820526-0.
- Kenny, Anthony, ed. (1994). The Oxford Illustrated History of Western Philosophy. Oxford University Press. ISBN 0-19-285440-2.
- Davies, Owen, ed. (2017). The Oxford Illustrated History of Witchcraft and Magic. ISBN 978-0-19-960844-7.
- Fernández-Armesto, Felipe, ed. (2021). The Oxford Illustrated History of the World. ISBN 9780198752905.
- Overy, Richard, ed. (2015). The Oxford Illustrated History of World War II. ISBN 978-0-19-960582-8.

== See also ==
- Cambridge Illustrated Histories
