= Angevin Empire =

Territories of the House of Plantagenet

Angevin Empire Empire Plantagenêt (Note: The term imperium is used at least once in the 12th century, in the Dialogus de Scaccari (c. 1179), Per longa terrarum spatia triumphali victoria suum dilataverit imperium. Some 20th-century historians have avoided the term empire, Robert-Henri Bautier (1984) used espace Plantagenêt, Jean Favier used complexe féodal. Empire Plantagenêt nevertheless remains current in French historiography.)
- 1154–1214
- Royal coat of arms

- The Angevin Empire in 1190
- Status: Composite monarchy
- Capital: No official capital. Court was generally held at Angers and Chinon.
- Official languages: Old French • Medieval Latin (Note: (administrative; liturgical))
- Regional languages: Basque; Middle Breton; Middle Cornish; Norman French; Cumbric; Middle English; Middle Irish; Old Occitan; Middle Welsh
- Religion: Roman Catholicism (official)
- Government: Feudal monarchy
- King, Duke, Count and Lord
  - 1154–1189: Henry II
  - 1189–1199: Richard I
  - 1154–1204 (Aquitaine, County of Poitou, southern France only): Eleanor of Aquitaine
  - 1199–1214: John
- Historical era: Middle Ages
  - Henry II inherits the Kingdom of England: 25 October 1154
  - Anglo-Norman invasion of Ireland: 1169–1177
  - Invasion of Normandy by Philip II of France: 1202–1204
  - Truce of Chinon: 28 September 1214
- Currency: French livre, silver penny, gold penny
Preceded by
| Kingdom of England |
| Gaelic Ireland |
| Kingdom of France |
| Principality of Wales |
| Welsh Marches |
Succeeded by
| Kingdom of England |
| Kingdom of France |
| Lordship of Ireland |
| Channel Islands |
| Principality of Wales |
| Welsh Marches |
- Today part of: France; Republic of Ireland; United Kingdom

The Angevin Empire (/ˈændʒɪvɪn/; French: Empire Plantagenêt) was the collection of territories held by the House of Plantagenet during the 12th and 13th centuries, when they ruled over an area covering roughly all of present-day England, half of France, and parts of Ireland and Wales, and claiming overlordship and some influence over the remaining parts of Wales, Scotland and Ireland. It may be described as an early example of a composite monarchy. The empire was established by Henry II of England, who succeeded his father Geoffrey as duke of Normandy and count of Anjou (from the latter of which the term Angevin is derived). Henry married Eleanor of Aquitaine in 1152, acquiring the Duchy of Aquitaine, and inherited his mother Empress Matilda's claim to the English throne, succeeding his rival Stephen in 1154. Although their title of highest rank came from the Kingdom of England, the Plantagenets held court primarily on the continent at Angers in Anjou and at Chinon in Touraine.

The influence and power of the Angevin kings of England brought them into conflict with the kings of France of the House of Capet, to whom they also owed feudal homage for their French possessions, bringing in a period of rivalry between the dynasties. Despite the extent of Angevin rule, Henry's son King John was defeated in the Anglo-French War (1213–1214) by Philip II of France following the Battle of Bouvines. John lost control of most of his continental possessions, apart from Guyenne and Gascony in southern Aquitaine. This defeat set the scene for further conflicts between England and France, leading up to the Hundred Years' War (1337–1453), in which the Plantagenets re-established dominion over much of western, central, and northern France before losing their possessions again, this time permanently.

== Terminology ==
The term Angevin Empire is a historiographic retronym defining the lands of the House of Plantagenet: Henry II and his sons Richard I and John. Another son, Geoffrey, ruled Brittany and established a separate line there. As far as historians know, there was no contemporary term for the region under Angevin control; however, descriptions such as "our kingdom and everything subject to our rule whatever it may be" were used. The term Angevin Empire was coined by Kate Norgate in her 1887 publication England under the Angevin Kings. In France, the term espace Plantagenet (French for "Plantagenet area") is sometimes used to describe the fiefdoms the Plantagenets had acquired.

The adoption of the Angevin Empire label marked a re-evaluation of the times, considering that both English and French influence spread throughout the dominion in the half-century during which the union lasted. The term Angevin is the demonym for the residents of Anjou and its historic capital, Angers; the Plantagenets were descended from Geoffrey I, Count of Anjou, hence the term. The demonym, according to the Oxford English Dictionary, has been in use since 1511.

The use of the term empire has engendered controversy among some historians over whether the term is accurate for the actual state of affairs at the time. The area was a collection of the lands inherited and acquired by Henry. The continental lands in question were fully part of the medieval Kingdom of France, and the lands in England were part of the Kingdom of England. Henry did not rule the lands he held in France as a king but ruled under the relevant local title such as "duje". There is no evidence that the lands owned or ruled by Henry shared any common identity relating to the Plantagenets and so should be labelled with the term empire in the context of a unified state. Referring to the shared lands as an empire of property real estate may be more accurate.

Some historians argue that the term should be reserved solely for the Holy Roman Empire, the only Western European political structure actually named an empire at that time, although Alfonso VII of León and Castile had taken the title "Emperor of all Spain" in 1135. Other historians argue that Henry II's empire was not powerful, centralised or large enough to be seriously called an empire. Furthermore, the Plantagenets never claimed any sort of imperial title as implied by the term Angevin Empire. However, even if the Plantagenets themselves did not claim an imperial title, some chroniclers, often working for Henry II, used the term empire to describe the assemblage of lands. The highest title was "king of England"; the other titles of dukes and counts of different areas held in France were independent from the royal title and were not subject to English royal law. Because of this, some historians, such as W. L. Warren, prefer the term commonwealth to empire, emphasising that the Angevin Empire was more of an assemblage of seven independent, sovereign states loosely bound to each other, only united in the person of the king of England.

== Geography and administration ==
France in 1180. The Angevin kings of England held all the red territories.

At its largest extent, the Angevin Empire consisted of the Kingdom of England, the Lordship of Ireland (which was considered illegitimate since Henry II broke the Treaty of Windsor), the Duchies of Normandy (which included the Channel Islands), Gascony and Aquitaine, as well as of the counties of Anjou, Poitou, Maine, Touraine, Saintonge, La Marche, Périgord, Limousin, Nantes and Quercy. While the duchies and counties were held with various levels of vassalage to the king of France, the Plantagenets held various levels of control over the duchies of Brittany and Cornwall, the Welsh princedoms, the County of Toulouse, and the Kingdom of Scotland, although those regions were not formal parts of the empire. Auvergne was also in the empire for parts of the reigns of Henry and Richard, in their capacity as dukes of Aquitaine. Henry and Richard pushed further claims over the County of Berry, but these were not completely fulfilled, and the county was lost completely by the time of the accession of John in 1199.

The frontiers of the empire were sometimes well known and therefore easy to mark, such as the levees constructed between the crown lands of France and the Duchy of Normandy. In other places, the borders were not so clear, particularly the eastern border of Aquitaine, where there was often a difference between the frontier that Henry and Richard claimed and the frontier where their effective power ended. Scotland was an independent kingdom, but after a disastrous campaign led by William the Lion, English garrisons were established in the castles of Edinburgh, Roxburgh, Jedburgh and Berwick in southern Scotland as defined in the Treaty of Falaise.

Rather than being administered directly by the ruling monarch, power was delegated to specially appointed subjects in different areas. Supported by what Warren calls a "self-regulating administrative machine", these subjects had varied political and military powers.

=== England ===
England was under the firmest control of all the lands in the Angevin Empire due to the age of many of the offices that governed the country and the established traditions and customs. England was divided in shires, with sheriffs in each enforcing the common law. A justiciar was appointed by the king to stand in his absence when he was on the continent. As the kings of England were more often in France than England, they used writs more frequently than did the Anglo-Saxon kings, which actually proved beneficial to England. Under William I's rule, Anglo-Saxon nobles had been largely replaced by Anglo-Norman settlers whose lands were split between England and France. This made it much harder for them to revolt against the king and defend all their lands simultaneously. The power of the English earls had grown during the Anarchy between Empress Matilda and King Stephen, as she and he vied for support by granting earldoms to various barons, but this reversed beginning with Henry II, whose reign saw the number of earls halve from 24 to 12. England instead saw a reliance on the exchequer to provide both financial and administrative control on behalf of the ruling monarch.

Wales obtained good terms provided it paid homage to the Plantagenets and recognised them as lords. However, it remained almost self-ruling. It supplied the Plantagenets with infantry and longbowmen.

=== Ireland ===
Ireland was ruled by the Lord of Ireland, who at first had great difficulty imposing his rule. Dublin and Leinster were Angevin strongholds, and Cork, Limerick and parts of eastern Ulster were taken by Anglo-Norman nobles.

=== France ===
All of the continental domains ruled by the Angevin kings were governed by a seneschal at the top of the hierarchical system, with lesser government officials such as baillis, vicomtes, and prévôts. However, all counties and duchies would differ to an extent.

Greater Anjou is a modern term to describe the area consisting of Anjou, Maine, Touraine, Vendôme, and Saintonge. Here, prévôts, the seneschal of Anjou, and other seneschals governed. However, the constituent counties, such as Maine, were often administered by the officials of the local lords, rather than their Angevin suzerains. Maine was initially largely self-governing and lacked centralized administration until the Angevin kings made efforts to improve governance by installing new officials, such as the seneschal of Le Mans. These reforms came too late for the Angevins, however, and only the Capetians saw the beneficial effects of this reform after they annexed the area.

Aquitaine differed in the level of administration in its different constituent regions. Gascony was a very loosely administered region. Officials were stationed mostly in Entre-Deux-Mers, Bayonne, Dax, but some were found on the pilgrimage route to Santiago de Compostela and also on the river Garonne up to Agen. The rest of Gascony was not administered, despite being a significantly larger area compared to other, smaller, well-administered provinces. This difficulty when it came to administering the region was not new – it had been just as difficult for the previous dukes to cement their authority over this area. A similar state of affairs was found in the eastern provinces of Périgord and Limousin, where there was not much of a royal administrative system and practically no officials were stationed. Indeed, there were lords that ruled these regions as if they were "sovereign princes" and they had extra powers, such as the ability to mint their own coins, something English lords had been unable to do for decades. The Lusignans, for example, became rivals to the Angevins during John's rule as he attempted to consolidate his power. Officials could be stationed in Poitou, however, as there was a large concentration of castles compared to the rest of Aquitaine.

Normandy was the most consistently administered state within the continental Angevin Empire. Under Angevin rule, ducal government was regularised and strengthened, with the seneschal of Normandy becoming the pre-eminent figure in Norman government. The seneschals' administrative and judicial power peaked with William FitzRalph. Below them were the baillis, who held executive, judicial, and financial powers. Theoe officials were introduced under Geoffrey of Anjou, replacing the weaker prévôts and vicomtes in response to the unrest that followed Henry I's death and Geoffrey's invasion. Ducal authority was the strongest on the frontier near the Capetian royal demesne.

Toulouse was held through weak vassalage by the count of Toulouse, but it was rare for him to comply with Angevin rule. Only Quercy was directly administered by the Angevins after Henry II's conquest in 1159, but it did remain a contested area. Brittany, a region in which the nobles were traditionally very independent, was under Angevin control during Henry II and Richard I's reigns. The county of Nantes was under the firmest control. The Angevins often involved themselves in Breton affairs, such as when Henry II arranged Conan of Brittany's marriage and installed the archbishop of Dol.

=== Economy ===
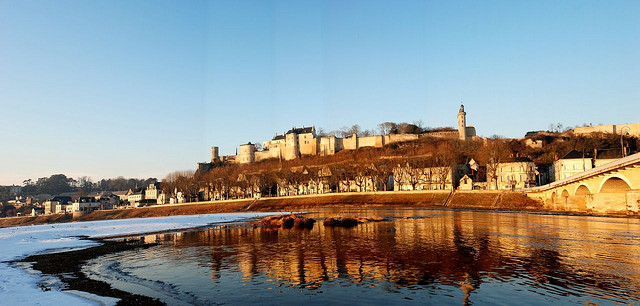
Chinon Castle, the administrative centre and location of the main treasury in the Angevin Empire.

The economy of the Angevin Empire was complex with varying political structures of the different fiefdoms. England and Normandy were well administered and therefore would be able to generate larger revenues than areas such as Aquitaine. This is because England and Normandy were home to more officials to collect taxes and, unlike Aquitaine, local lords were unable to mint their own coins, allowing the Angevin kings to control the economy from their administrative base of Chinon. Chinon's importance was shown by Richard's seizure of Chinon first when he rebelled against his father in 1187 and then when John rushed to Chinon after his brother's death.

Money raised in England was used mostly for continental issues, although historian John Gillingham argues that although areas like Normandy, Anjou, and Aquitaine are recorded to have brought in less revenue compared to England, much of this is due to poor financial accounts for these continental possessions. Gillingham argues that by the end of Richard's reign, Normandy may have been generating even more revenue for the royal treasury than England.

When financial records begin in 1155 to 1156, the annual income of England was £10,500, or around half what the revenue had been under Henry I. This was caused by the Anarchy and King Stephen's loose rule resulting in the reduction of royal authority. As time went on, royal authority improved, and the revenue consequently went up to an average of £22,000 per year. During preparation for the Third Crusade, revenue increased to over £31,000 in 1190 under Richard. The number fell again to £11,000 per year whilst Richard was abroad. Between 1194 and 1198, the average annual revenue was £25,000. Under John, income fluctuated between £22,000 and £25,000 from 1199 to 1203. In order to fund the reconquest of France, income increased to £50,000 in 1210 but then rose to over £83,000 in 1211 before falling back down to £50,000 in 1212. Revenue then fell below £26,000 in 1214 and further to £18,500 in 1215. The first three years of Henry III's reign brought in £8,000 on average due to the fragility the civil war had brought to England.

In Ireland, the revenue was fairly low at £2,000 for 1212; however, all other records did not survive. For Normandy, there were many fluctuations relative to the politics of the duchy. The Norman revenues were £6,750 in 1180; then, they reached £25,000 per year by 1198, higher than in England. What was more impressive was that the Norman population was considerably smaller than England's, an estimated 1.5 million as opposed to England's 3.5 million. This period has become known as the 'Norman Fiscal Revolution' due to this increase in revenue.

For Aquitaine and Anjou, no records remain. However, it is not because those regions were poor; there were large vineyards, important cities and iron mines. For example, English chronicler Ralph of Diceto writes:

Aquitaine overflows with riches of many kinds, excelling other parts of the western world to such an extent that historians consider it to be one of the most fortunate and flourishing of the provinces of Gaul. Its fields are fertile, its vineyards productive and its forests teem with wild life. From the Pyrenees northwards the whole countryside is irrigated by the River Garonne and other streams, indeed it is from these life-giving waters that the province takes its name.

The Capetian kings did not record such incomes, although the royal principality was more centralized under Louis VII and Philip II than it had been under Hugh Capet or Robert the Pious. The wealth of the Plantagenet kings was definitely regarded as greater; Gerald of Wales comments on this wealth:

One may therefore ask how King Henry II and his sons, in spite of their many wars, possessed so much treasure. The reason is that as their fixed returns yielded less they took care to make up the total by extraordinary levies, relying more and more on these than on the ordinary sources of revenue.

Petit Dutailli had commented: "Richard maintained a superiority in resources which would have given him the opportunity, had he lived, to crush his rival." There is another interpretation, not widely followed and proven wrong, that the king of France could have raised a stronger income, that the royal principality of the king of France generated alone more incomes than all the Angevin Empire combined.

== Formation ==
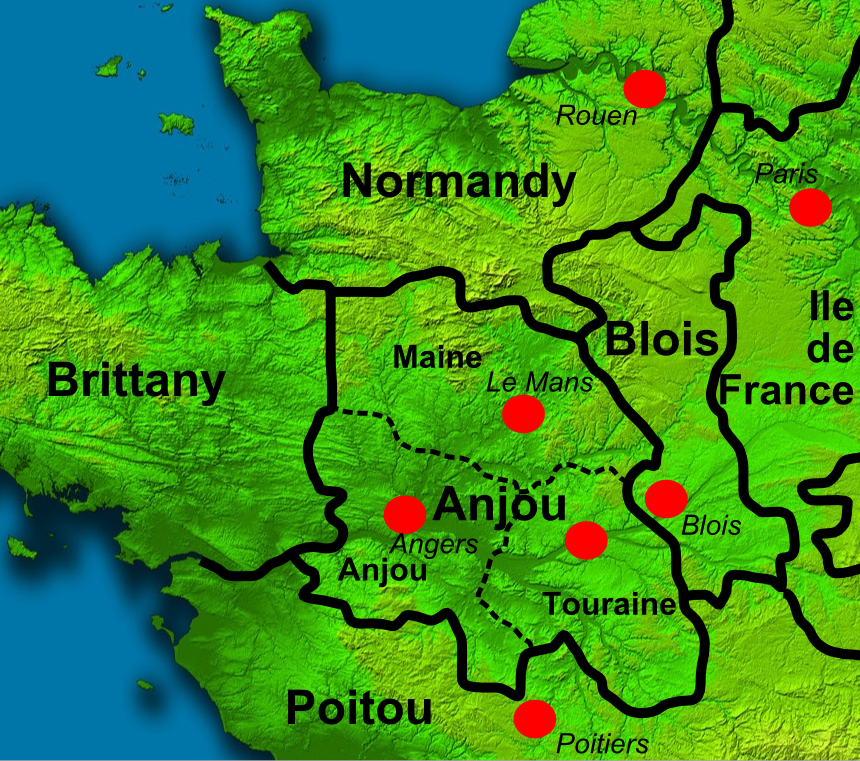
Northern France around the County of Anjou; red circles mark regional centres

=== Background ===
The counts of Anjou had been vying for power in northwestern France since the 10th century. The counts were recurrent enemies of the dukes of Normandy and of Brittany and often the French king. Fulk IV, Count of Anjou, claimed rule over Touraine, Maine and Nantes; however, of these only Touraine proved to be effectively ruled, as the construction of the castles of Chinon, Loches and Loudun exemplify. Fulk married his son and namesake, called "Fulk the Younger", to Ermengarde, heiress of the province of Maine, thus unifying it with Anjou through personal union.

While the dynasty of the Angevins was successfully consolidating their power in France, their rivals the Normans had conquered England in the 11th century. Meanwhile in the rest of France, the Ramnulfids had become dukes of Aquitaine and of Gascony, and Stephen, Count of Blois (the father of the next king of England, Stephen) became the count of Champagne. France was being split between only a few noble families.

=== The Anarchy and question of Norman succession ===
In 1106, Henry I of England had defeated his brother Robert Curthose and angered Robert's son, William Clito, Count of Flanders. Henry used his paternal inheritance to take the Duchy of Normandy and the Kingdom of England and then tried to establish an alliance with Anjou by marrying his only legitimate son, William, to Fulk the Younger's daughter, Matilda. However, William died in the White Ship disaster in 1120. As a result, Henry then married his daughter Matilda to Geoffrey "Plantagenet", Fulk's son and successor; however, Henry's subjects had to accept Matilda's inheritance to the throne of England. There had been only one occurrence of a medieval European queen regnant before, Urraca of León and Castile, and it was not an encouraging precedent; nevertheless, in January 1127 the Anglo-Normans barons and prelates recognized Matilda as heiress to the throne in an oath. On 17 June 1128, the wedding between Matilda and Geoffrey was celebrated in Le Mans.

In order to secure Matilda's succession to the royal throne, she and Geoffrey needed castles and supporters in both England and Normandy, but if they succeeded there would be two authorities in England: the king and Matilda. Henry prevented the conflict by refusing to hand over any castles to Matilda as well as confiscating the lands of the nobles he suspected of supporting her. By 1135, major disputes between Henry and Matilda drove the nobles previously loyal to Henry against Matilda. In November, Henry was dying; Matilda was with her husband in Maine and Anjou while Stephen—brother of Theobald, Count of Blois and Champagne, who was Matilda's cousin and another contender for the English and Norman thrones—was in Boulogne. Stephen rushed to England upon the news of Henry's death and was crowned king of England in December 1135.

Geoffrey first sent Matilda alone to Normandy in a diplomatic mission to be recognized duchess of Normandy and replace Stephen. Geoffrey followed at the head of his army and quickly captured several fortresses in southern Normandy. It was then that a noble in Anjou, Robert II of Sablé, rebelled, forcing Geoffrey to withdraw and prevent an attack on his rear. When Geoffrey returned to Normandy in September 1136, the region had become plagued with internal, baronial infighting. Stephen was not able to travel to Normandy and so the situation remained. Geoffrey had found new allies with the count of Vendôme and, most importantly, William X, Duke of Aquitaine. However, Geoffrey was wounded and was forced to return to Anjou again. Furthermore, an outbreak of dysentery plagued his army. Chronicler Orderic Vitalis states "the invaders had to run for home leaving a trail of filth behind them". Stephen finally arrived in Normandy in 1137 and restored order but had lost much credibility in the eyes of his main supporter, Robert of Gloucester and so Robert changed sides and supported Geoffrey and Matilda instead. Geoffrey took Caen and Argentan without resistance but now had to defend Robert's possessions in England against Stephen. In 1139 Robert and Matilda crossed the channel and arrived in England while Geoffrey kept the pressure on Normandy. Stephen was captured in February 1141 at the Battle of Lincoln, which prompted the collapse of his authority in both England and Normandy.

Geoffrey controlled almost all of Normandy but no longer had the support of Aquitaine after William X was succeeded by his daughter Eleanor, who had married Louis VII of France in 1137. Louis was not concerned with the events in Normandy and England. While Geoffrey consolidated his Norman power, Matilda suffered defeats in England. At Winchester, Robert of Gloucester was captured while covering Matilda's retreat, so Matilda freed Stephen in exchange for Robert.

In 1142, Geoffrey was asked by Matilda for assistance but refused; he had become more interested in Normandy. Following the capture of Avranches, Mortain and Cherbourg, Rouen surrendered to him in 1144 and he anointed himself duke of Normandy. In exchange for Gisors, he was formally recognised by Louis VII. However, Geoffrey still did not assist Matilda even as she was on the verge of defeat. Further rebellion occurred in Anjou, including Geoffrey's younger brother, Helie, demanding Maine. It was during this period of Angevin unrest that Geoffrey dropped the title of duke of Normandy and formally invested his son Henry as duke in 1150, though both Geoffrey and Matilda would continue to dominate Norman affairs. The following six decades of Angevin rule over Normandy would see the establishment of Norman customs and institutions that would last until the French Revolution.

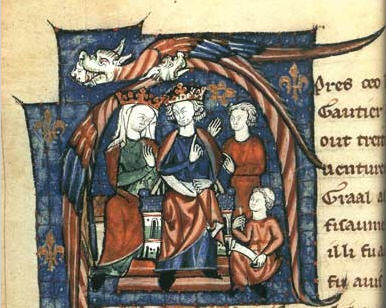
12th-century depiction of Henry and Eleanor of Aquitaine holding court

Stephen continued to claim Normandy, believing an alliance with Louis was possible. Louis VII had recognised Henry as duke of Normandy in August 1151 in exchange for concessions in the Norman Vexin but remained angered by Henry and Geoffrey's treatment of Giraud II of Montreuil-Berlay following Giraud's failed rebellion against Angevin rule the year before. In September the situation shifted when Geoffrey died and Henry inherited his position as count of Anjou, with rule also over Touraine and Maine. Geoffrey had planned to leave Anjou to his son, Geoffrey FitzEmpress, but this would have hampered Henry's ability to succeed in conquering England. Geoffrey instead asked his vassals to swear that his body would be left unburied until Henry promised to abide by his wishes. Warren suggests that this story was spread purely to justify his son's later rebellion against Henry, and that the Angevin nobles supported the story as it gave them an opportunity to reclaim their lost autonomy.

In March 1152, Louis VII and Eleanor of Aquitaine had their marriage annulled under the pretext of consanguinity at the council of Beaugency. The terms of the annulment left Eleanor as duchess of Aquitaine but still a vassal of Louis. She left Beaugency for Poitiers, narrowly escaping an ambush by Geoffrey FitzEmpress on route, and there, eight weeks later, she married Henry. Thus Henry became duke of Aquitaine and Gascony and count of Poitou. Louis responded with a furious attack on Normandy.

In Anjou, Henry had refused to give the county Geoffrey FitzEmpress, and thus a coalition of Henry's enemies was formed by Louis VII: Stephen of England and his son Eustace IV of Boulogne (married to Louis' sister); Henry I, Count of Champagne (betrothed to Louis' daughter), Robert of Dreux (Louis' brother) and Geoffrey FitzEmpress.

In July 1152, Capetian troops attacked Aquitaine while Louis, Eustace, Henry of Champagne, and Robert attacked Normandy. Geoffrey raised a revolt in Anjou while Stephen attacked Angevin loyalists in England. Several Anglo-Norman nobles switched allegiance, sensing an impending disaster. Henry was about to sail for England to pursue his claim when his lands were attacked. He first reached Anjou and compelled Geoffrey to surrender. He then sailed to England in January 1153 to meet Stephen. Louis fell ill and had to retire from the conflict while Henry's defences held against his enemies. After seven months of battles and politics, Henry failed to get rid of Stephen, but then Eustace died in dubious circumstances, "struck by the wrath of god." Stephen gave up the struggle by ratifying the Treaty of Winchester, making Henry his heir on condition that the landed possessions of his family were guaranteed in England and France—the same terms Matilda had previously refused after her victory at Lincoln.

Henry became King Henry II of England upon Stephen's death on 25 October 1154. Subsequently, the question was again raised of Henry's oath to cede Anjou to his brother Geoffrey. Henry received a dispensation from Pope Adrian IV under the pretext the oath had been forced upon him, and he proposed compensations to Geoffrey at Rouen in 1156. Geoffrey refused and returned to Anjou to rebel against Henry. Geoffrey may have had a strong claim, but his position was weak. Louis would not interfere since Henry paid homage to him for his continental possessions. Henry crushed Geoffrey's revolt, and Geoffrey had to be satisfied with an annual pension. The Angevin Empire had now been formed.

== Expansion ==
In the earlier years of his reign, Henry claimed further lands and worked on the creation of a ring of vassal states as buffers, especially around England and Normandy. The most obvious areas to expand, where large claims were held, were Scotland, Wales, Brittany, and, as an ally rather than a new dominion, Flanders.

King David I of Scotland had taken advantage of the Anarchy to seize Cumberland, Westmorland and Northumberland. In Wales, important leaders like Rhys of Deheubarth and Owain Gwynedd had emerged. In Brittany, there is no evidence that the Duke of Brittany, Eudes II, had recognised the Norman overlordship. Two vital frontier castles, Moulins-la-Marche and Bonmoulins, had never been taken back by Geoffrey Plantagenet and were in the hands of Robert of Dreux. Count Thierry of Flanders had joined the alliance formed by Louis VII in 1153. Further south, the Count of Blois acquired Amboise. From Henry's perspective, these territorial issues needed solving.

Henry showed himself to be an audacious and daring king as well as being active and mobile; 12th century historian Roger of Howden states that Henry travelled across his dominions so fast that Louis VII once exclaimed "The king of England is now in Ireland, now in England, now in Normandy, he seems rather to fly than to go by horse or ship." Henry was often more present in France than in England; Chronicler Ralph de Diceto said with irony:

There is nothing left to send to bring the king back to England but the Tower of London.

=== Castles and strongholds in France ===
The situation in 1154

Henry bought Vernon and Neuf-Marché back from Louis in 1154. This strategy regulated the Plantagenet-Capetian relationship. Louis had been unsuccessful in his attempt to break Henry down. Because of the Angevin control of England in 1154, it was pointless to object to the superiority of the overall Angevin forces over the Capetian ones. However, Henry refused to back down despite Louis' apparent change of policy until the Norman Vexin was entirely recovered. Chancellor of England Thomas Becket was sent as ambassador to Paris in the summer of 1158 to lead negotiations. He displayed all the wealth the Angevins could provide and, according to William Fitzstephen, a clerk and companion of Becket, a Frenchman exclaimed "If the Chancellor of England travels in such splendor, what must the king be?" Louis' daughter Margaret, who was still a baby, was betrothed to Henry's heir, his eldest son Henry the Young King with a dowry of the Norman Vexin. Henry was given back the castles of Moulins-la-Marche and Bonmoulins. Theobald V, Count of Blois handed Amboise and Fréteval back to him.

=== Flanders ===
The counts of Flanders had long been powerful but capricious allies of the kings of France. Count Thierry had taken part in Louis' early assaults against Henry, and Henry had expelled all Flemish mercenaries in England at the time of his accession, but much of Flanders' prosperity relied on English trade and England traded much of its wool via the Flemish port of Boulogne. Henry therefore was able to re-establish friendly relations to the extent that Thierry appointed Henry guardian of his eldest son and regent Philip when Thierry undertook his pilgrimage to Jerusalem in 1157.

When William of Blois died without an heir in 1159, the titles of count of Boulogne and count of Mortain fell vacant. Henry absorbed Mortain into his Duchy of Normandy and granted Boulogne and William's sister Mary to Thierry's son Matthew. Through this marriage, and the 1163 renewal of a previous treaty between Henry and Robert II of Flanders, Henry was assured of Flemish neutrality if war broke out with the king of France again. Flanders would provide Henry with knights in exchange of an annual tribute in money, known as a "money-fief".

=== Brittany ===
In 1148 Conan III, Duke of Brittany, died, leaving behind two children. Although his son Hoël was the natural choice to succeed to the duchy, evidence suggests that Hoël was illegitimate and instead he was only recognised as count of Nantes. Hoël's sister Bertha became duchess of Brittany, ruling alongside her husband Eudo of Porhoët. However Bertha had a son, Conan, from her previous marriage to the late Alan de Bretagne. Conan had been too young to succeed his grandfather in 1148, but he became Henry's candidate to become duke of Brittany upon Bertha's death, as his English holdings as earl of Richmond meant he would be easier to control.

In Nantes, possibly because Hoël recognized Bertha's suzerainty over the county, the citizens rose up against Hoël in 1156 and installed Henry's brother Geoffrey in Hoël's place as count, at Henry's suggestion. In September this was followed up with a successful invasion of the duchy by Conan against Eudo, ending in Conan's accession as duke of Brittany, albeit with Nantes remaining under direct Angevin control. However, by 1158 Geoffrey died, and Conan seized Nantes. Nantes was especially important to Henry as it sat at the mouth of the Loire and threatened trade from Angers and Tours. Henry responded to this seizure by mustering an army in Avranches, as well as threatening Conan's English estates. Conan submitted, ceding Nantes back to Henry and in return was recognised as duke. During Conan's rule, Henry continued to intervene—he arranged Conan's marriage to Margaret of Scotland and appointed the archbishop of Dol, despite attempts by the archbishop of Tours, Engelbald, to subsume Dol into his archdiocese.

By 1166, it became apparent that Conan was unable to independently maintain order in Brittany, and in response Henry seized control. He betrothed Conan's daughter and heir Constance to his son Geoffrey and took possession of the duchy in Geoffrey's name. At Thouars, Henry received homage from most of the Breton nobles, and then went on to Rennes where the Breton dukes had historically been invested in the city's cathedral. Over the following years, some nobles continued to rebel against Angevin rule, but Henry responded to each rebellion with confiscations of territory and castles. By 1169, the duchy was firmly under Angevin control, with Geoffrey receiving homage from the Breton nobles at Rennes.

=== Scotland ===
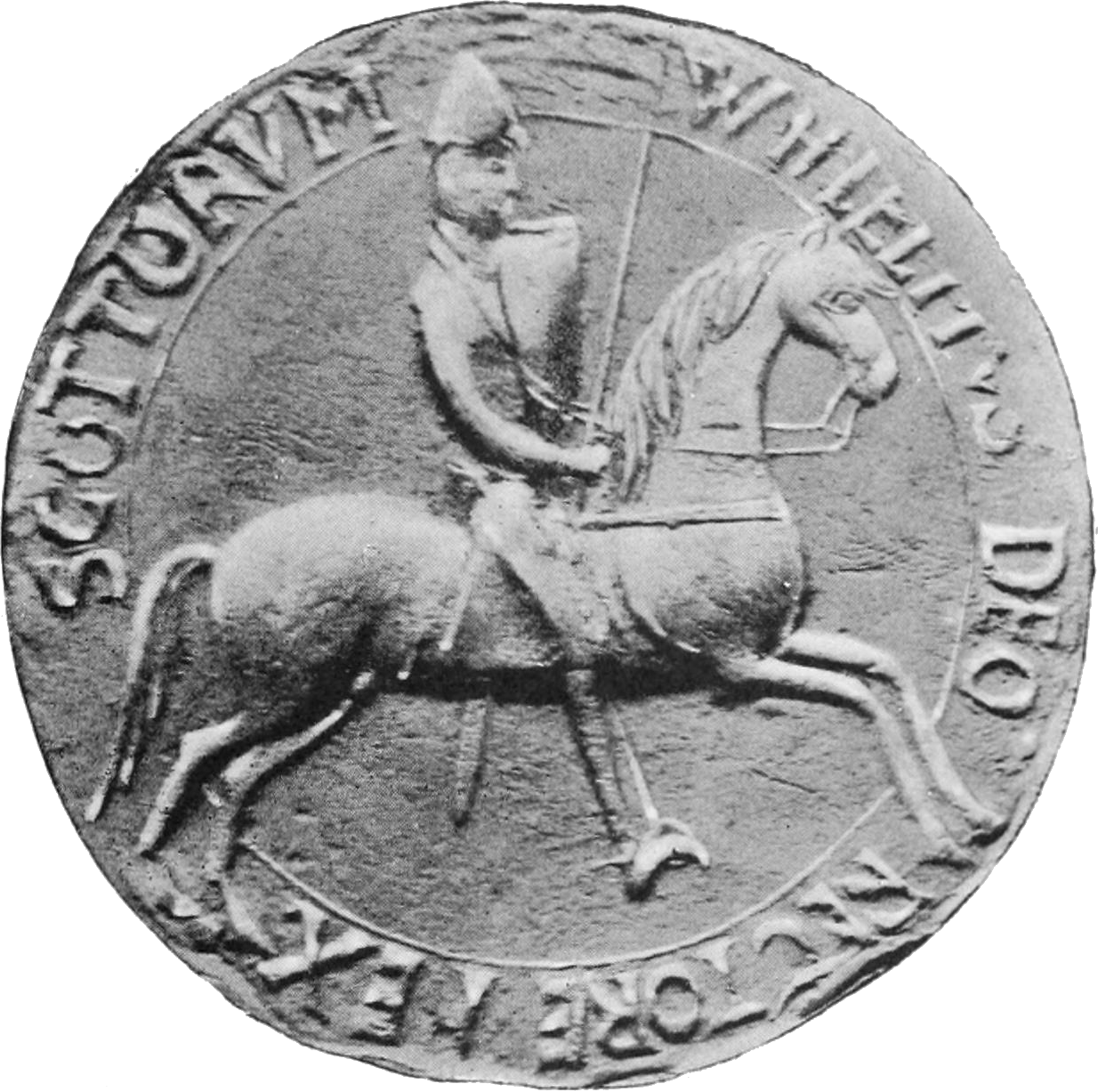
Seal of William the Lion, King of Scotland

Henry met King Malcolm IV in 1157 to discuss Cumberland, Westmorland and Northumberland, which had previously been seized by Malcolm's grandfather David I of Scotland. In 1149, before Henry became powerful, he made an oath to David that the lands north of Newcastle should belong to the king of Scotland forever. Malcolm reminded him of this oath, but Henry did not comply. There is no evidence that Henry recedived a dispensation from the pope this time, as 12th century William of Newburgh puts it, "prudently considering it was the king of England who had the better of the argument by reason of his much greater power." Malcolm gave up and paid homage in return for Huntingdon, which he had inherited from his father.

William the Lion, the next king of Scotland, was unhappy with Henry since he was given Northumberland by David in 1152 and therefore lost it to Henry when Malcolm handed it back in 1157. As a part of the coalition set by Louis VII, William the Lion first invaded Northumberland in 1173 and then again in 1174; as a result he was captured at the Battle of Alnwick and had to sign the tough Treaty of Falaise. Garrisons were to be set in the castles of Edinburgh, Roxburgh, Jedburgh and Berwick. Southern Scotland was from then under firm control just as Brittany was. On 5 December 1189, Richard I annulled the treaty, returned of Roxburgh and Berwick and a formal acknowledgment of Scotland's independence in return for money to fund Richard's crusade in what Warren calls a "diplomatic triumph," protecting England's northern flank during John's later rebellion of 1193–1194.

=== Wales ===
Rhys of Deheubarth, also called Lord Rhys, and Owain Gwynedd were closed to negotiations. Henry attacked Wales three times, in 1157, 1158 and 1163 to have them answer his summons to the court. The Welsh found his terms too harsh and largely revolted against him. Henry undertook a fourth invasion in 1164, this time with a massive army. According to Welsh chronicle Brut y Tywysogion, Henry raised "a mighty host of the picked warriors of England and Normandy and Flanders and Anjou and Gascony and Scotland" to "carry into bondage and to destroy all the Britons".

Bad weather, rains, floods, and constant harassment from the Welsh armies slowed the Angevin army and prevented the capture of Wales; a furious Henry had Welsh hostages mutilated following the Battle of Crogen. Wales would remain safe for a while, but the invasion of Ireland in 1171 pressured Henry to end the issue through negotiations with Lord Rhys.

=== Ireland ===
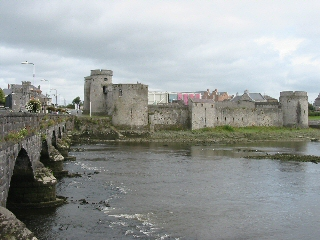
King John's Castle, on the river Shannon

There were plans of expansion considered, as Henry's brother William Fitzempress had no fiefdom. The Holy See was most likely to support a campaign in Ireland to bring its church into the Christian Latin world of Rome. Henry was given Rome's blessing in 1155 under the form of a papal bull, but he had to postpone the invasion of Ireland because of all the problems in his domains and around them. In the terms of the Bull Laudabiliter, "Laudably and profitably does your magnificence contemplate extending your glorious name on earth."

William died in 1164 without being installed in Ireland, but Henry did not give up on the conquest of Ireland. In 1167 Irish King Dermot of Leinster was recognised as "prince of Leinster" by Henry and was allowed to recruit soldiers in England and Wales to use in Ireland against the other kings. The knights first met great success in carving themselves lands in Ireland, and Henry landed in Ireland in October 1171 near Waterford and confronted to such demonstration of power most native kings of Ireland recognised him as their lord. Even Rory O' Connor, the king of Connacht and High King of Ireland paid homage to Henry. Henry installed some of his men in strongholds like Dublin and Leinster (as Dermot had dies). He also gave unconquered kingdoms such as Cork, Limerick and Ulster to his men and left the Normans carving their lands in Ireland.

In 1177 Henry made his son John the first Lord of Ireland, but John's youth meant it wasn't until 1185 that he departed with 300 knights to cement his rule. John almost immediately failed, uniting Irish chieftains and Anglo-Norman settlers alike against him. He returned within the year to his father—he would not return for 25 years, while other Anglo-Normans such as John de Courcy and Hugh de Lacy built castles and installed their interests.

=== Toulouse ===
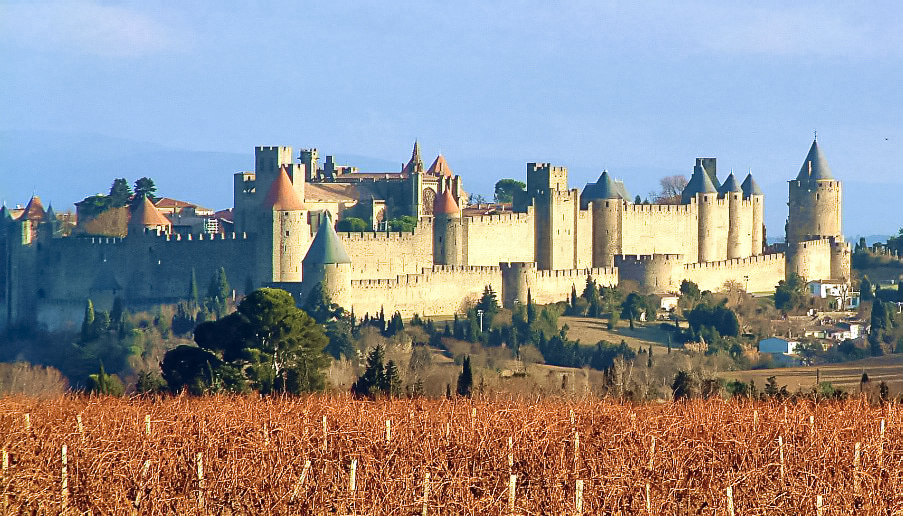
Carcassonne

Much less tenable was the claim over Toulouse, the fortified seat of the County of Toulouse. Eleanor's ancestors claimed the large county, as it had been the central power of the ancient Duchy of Aquitaine in the times of Odo the Great. However Henry and possibly Eleanor were likely not related to this ancient line of dukes; Eleanor was a Ramnulfid, while Henry was an Angevin.

Toulouse was larger, more heavily fortified, and much richer than many cities of the time. It was strategically important, sitting between the Atlantic Ocean and the Mediterranean, dominating regional trade and road networks that included significant towns such as Narbonne, Cahors, Albi, Nîmes and Carcassonne. The recurrent conflicts by the Angevins with Toulouse was called the Forty Years War by William of Newburgh.

In June 1159 Henry's forces gathered in Poitiers. They included troops from all of his fiefdoms from Gascony to England, as well as reinforcements sent by Thierry and King Malcolm IV of Scotland. Even a Welsh prince joined the fray. The only larger armies of the time were those raised for major crusades. Henry attacked from the north; his allies the Trencavels and Ramon Berenguer opened a second front. Henry could not capture Toulouse proper since King Louis VII was part of the defence, Henry and did not want to set an example to his vassals or have to deal with keeping his sovereign prisoner. Henry did capture Cahors along with castles in the Garonne valley in the Quercy region. Henry returned in 1161, but too busy with conflicts elsewhere in his fiefdom, he left his allies fighting against Toulouse. King Alfonso II of Aragon had interests there and joined the war. In 1171, Henry's alliance was bolstered by another of Raymond's enemies, Humbert of Maurienne. In 1173 in Limoges, Raymond finally gave up after over a decade of constant fights. He paid homage to Henry and to Henry's sons: Henry and Richard, Duke of Aquitaine.

== Apex ==
The attacks on Toulouse made clear that peace between Louis and Henry was not peace at all but just an opportunity for Henry to make war elsewhere. Louis was in an awkward position: his subject Henry was largely more powerful than he was, and Louis had no male heir. Constance, his second wife, died in childbirth in 1160, and Louis announced he would remarry at once, in the urgent need of a male heir, with Adèle of Champagne. Louis' daughter Margaret was betrothed to Henry's son Henry the Young King on 2 November 1160. Henry the Young King was five years old at the time of this agreement while Margaret was about two. Margaret's dowry was the vital and much disputed territory of Vexin. Thus, if Louis died without a male heir, Henry would have been a strong candidate for the French throne.

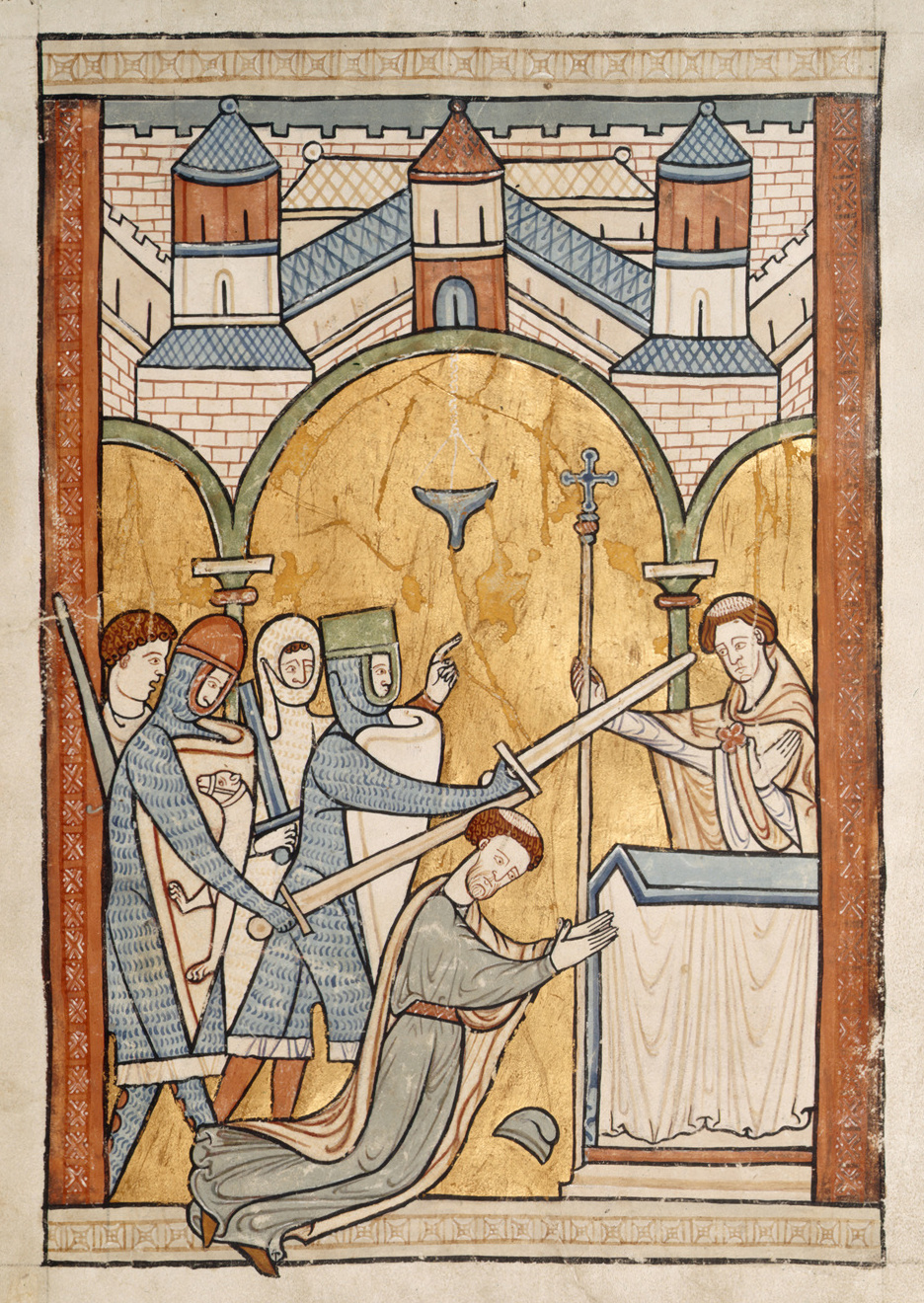
Earliest known portrayal of Thomas Becket's murder in Canterbury Cathedral, where he was archbishop.

In 1164 Louis found a dangerous ally in Archbishop of Canterbury Thomas Becket. Louis and Becket had met previously in 1158, but now the circumstances were different; France was already a refuge to a few clerical refugees, and Louis was known as Rex Christianisimus (most Christian king), called so by John of Salisbury. Becket took refuge in France, and following this there were growing conflicts between Henry and Becket. Henry finally provoked Becket's murder in 1170 by announcing, "What miserable traitors have I nourished in my household who led their lord be treated with such shameful contempt by a low-born clerk!" Christendom blamed Henry, whereas Louis gained widespread approval through his protection of Becket. Louis' secular power was much weaker than Henry's, but Louis now had the moral advantage.

In 1165 hopes of Henry the Young King's future accession to the French throne were dashed when Adèle gave birth to a son, Philip. Following this, the fragile Anglo-French peace ended. In 1167, Henry II marched into Auvergne, and in 1170 he attacked Bourges. Louis answered by raiding Vexin, forcing Henry to move his troops north, giving Louis the opportunity to free Bourges. At this point, Gillingham mentions in The Angevin Empire that he believes Louis "must have wondered whether there was ever going to be an end to Henry's aggressively expansionist policies".

Henry did not treat his territories as a coherent empire, as the term "Angevin Empire" would suggest, but as private, individual possessions that he planned to distribute to his children. Henry The Young King was crowned king of England in 1170 (though he never ruled); Richard became Duke of Aquitaine in 1172; Geoffrey became Duke of Brittany in 1181; John became Lord of Ireland in 1185; Eleanor was promised to Alfonso VII with Gascony as dowry during the campaign against Toulouse in 1170. This partition of the lands between his children made it much harder for him to control them, as now they could fund their own ventures with their estates and attempt to overrule their father in their respective dominions.

Following his coronation in 1173, Henry the Young King asked for part of his inheritance, at least England, Normandy, or Anjou, but his father refused. Young Henry then joined Louis at the French court to otherthrow his father together, and his mother Eleanor joined the new revolt against Henry II. Both Richard and Geoffrey soon joined Henry II. Enemies that Henry II had made joined the conflict with Louis, including King William of Scotland, Count Philip of Flanders, Count Matthew of Boulogne and Count Theobald of Blois. Henry II emerged victorious; his wealth meant he could recruit large numbers of mercenaries. He had captured and imprisoned Eleanor early on, and the capture of King William allowed him to force Scotland into the Treaty of Falaise. Henry bought the County of Marche, then he asserted that Vexin and Bourges should be given back at once. However, this time there was no invasion to back the claim.

=== Richard I and Philip II ===
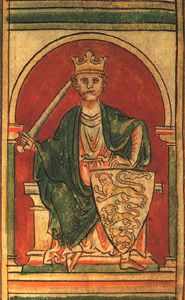
Richard I of England

Louis died in 1180 and was succeeded by his 15-year-old son, crowned as Philip II. The man who would later become Philip's main rival, the future Richard I, had administered Aquitaine since 1175 but his policy of centralisation of the Aquitanian government had grown unpopular in the eastern part of the duchy, notably Périgord and Limousin. Richard was further disliked in Aquitaine because of his apparent disregard for Aquitaine's customs of inheritance, as shown by events in Angoulême in 1181. If Richard was unpopular in Aquitaine though, Philip was equally disliked by his contemporaries with comments describing him as: astute, manipulative, calculating, penurious and ungallant ruler.

In 1183 Henry the Young King joined a revolt to overthrow the unpopular Duke Richard, led by the viscount of Limoges and Geoffrey of Lusignan, where Henry would take Richard's place. Joined by Philip, Count Raymond V of Toulouse, and Duke Hugh III of Burgundy, Henry died suddenly of a fatal illness in 1183, and Richard thus became the next in line for the English throne. Henry ordered Richard to hand Aquitaine to his brother John, but Richard refused. Henry was busy with Welsh princes contesting his authority, William the Lion was asking for his castles to be given back that had been taken in the Treaty of Falaise, and Philip wanted Vexin back. Henry decided instead to insist Richard to nominally surrender Aquitaine to his mother whilst Richard would retain actual control. Still, in 1183, Count Raymond had taken Cahors back and so Henry asked Richard to mount an expedition to retake the city. At the time, Geoffrey of Brittany had been quarrelling violently with Richard, and Philip planned to use this, but Geoffrey's death in 1186 in a tournament killed the plot. The next year, Philip and Richard had become strong allies:

The King of England was struck with great astonishment, and wondered what [this alliance] could mean, and, taking precautions for the future, frequently sent messengers into France for the purpose of recalling his son Richard; who, pretending that he was peaceably inclined and ready to come to his father, made his way to Chinon, and, in spite of the person who had the custody thereof, carried off the greater part of his father's treasures, and fortified his castles in Poitou with the same, refusing to go to his father.

— Roger of Hoveden, The Annals of Roger of Hoveden, vol. 2, trans. Henry T. Riley, London, 1853

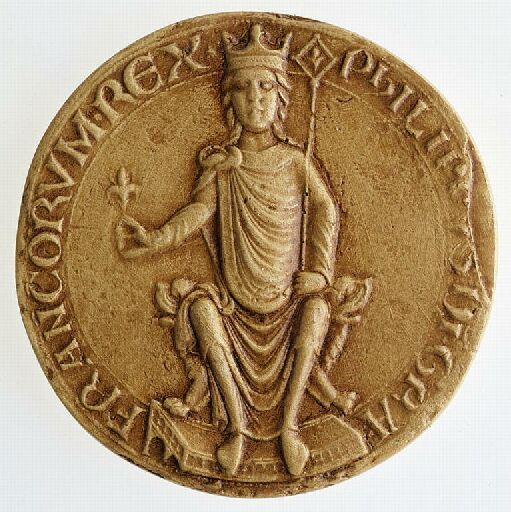
Philip II of France

In 1188 Raymond attacked again, joined by the Lusignans, vassals of Richard. It was rumoured that Henry had financed the revolts. Philip attacked Henry in Normandy and captured strongholds in Berry, then they met to discuss peace again. Henry refused to make Richard his heir, with one story reporting that Richard said "Now at last, I must believe what I had always thought impossible."

Henry's plans collapsed. Richard paid homage to Philip for the continental lands his father held, then they attacked Henry together. The Aquitanians refused to help whilst the Bretons seized the opportunity to attack him too. Henry was encircled at Chinon and was compelled to surrender. He gave a large tribute in money to Philip and swore that all his subjects in France and England would recognise Richard as their lord. Henry died two days later after learning that his son John had joined Richard and Philip. He was buried in Fontevraud Abbey.

Eleanor, who had been Henry's hostage since the revolt, was freed while Rhys ap Gruffydd, ruler of Deheubarth in South Wales, began to reconquer the parts of Wales that Henry had annexed. Richard was crowned King Richard I of England in Westminster Abbey in November 1189, and had already been installed as Duke of Normandy, Count of Anjou and Duke of Aquitaine. Richard demanded Philip surrender the Vexin, but then the issue was settled when Richard announced he would marry Philip's sister Alys. Richard also recognised Auvergne as being in Philip's royal demesne and not as part of the Duchy of Aquitaine, as Henry had claimed. King William of Scotland and Richard opened negotiations to revoke the Treaty of Falaise, and an agreement was reached.

=== Third Crusade ===
The next priority for Richard was the Third Crusade; it had been delayed since Richard had taken the cross in 1187. This was not just a religious pilgrimage, however; his great-grandfather, Fulk had been King of Jerusalem, and the current pretender to the throne, Guy de Lusignan, was a Poitevin noble, related to many of Richard's vassals, while Guy's wife Sybilla was Richard's cousin. The crusade, excluding disputes in France, would be the main reason for Richard's absence from England; he would spend less than six months of his reign in England.

Before leaving, Richard consolidated his reign over the empire. He suspected Count Raymond would expand his lands into Aquitaine so he allied with Sancho VI the Wise, the king of Navarre, by marrying his daughter Berengaria to counter the threat. On the way to the Holy Land, the ruler of Cyprus offended Richard's bride, and Richard's army conquered the island. They married in 1191 in Limassol, Cyprus, therefore repudiating Alys, but the issue had been settled earlier in Messina: to placate Philip, Richard had given him 10,000 marks and agreed that if he had two sons, they would both hold lands in France directly under Philip. The administration Richard left behind worked considerably well, as an attack from Raymond was repelled with the help of Navarre.

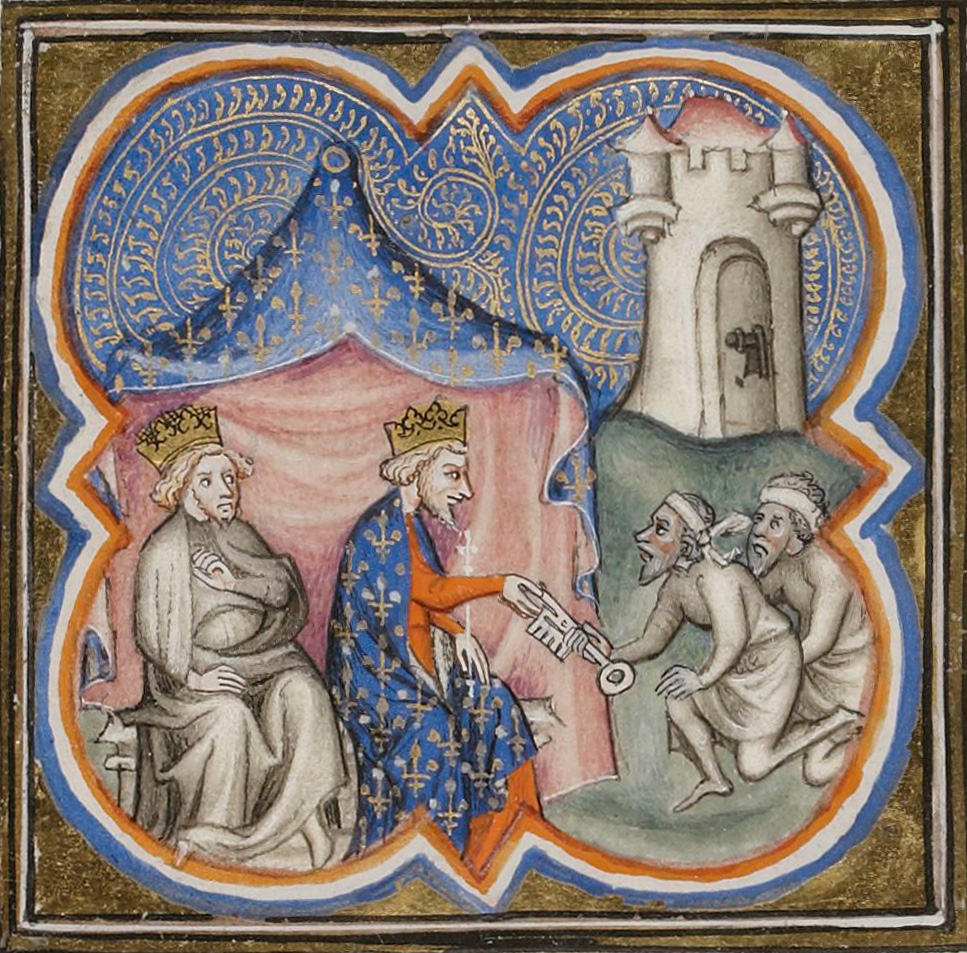
Richard I and Philip II at Acre

The siege of Acre, which had been the last Christian stronghold in Holy Land, was over by July 1191, and Philip decided to return to France. It is unclear whether Philip returned due to dysentery, anger towards Richard, or that he thought he could gain Artois following the death of the Count of Flanders, as he had married the count's daughter. Whilst back at France, Philip boasted he was "going to devastate the king of England's lands," and in January 1192 he demanded the Vexin from William FitzRalph, Seneschal of Normandy, claiming that the treaty he had signed with Richard in Messina contained the intention of Richard that—as the Vexin had been Alys' dowry and since Richard had married Berengaria—he was entitled to the land. Although Philip threatened invasion, Eleanor of Aquitaine intervened in stopping her son John from promising to concede the land. Philip's nobles refused to attack the lands of an absent crusader, though Philip instead gained lands in Artois. Philip's return resulted in castles throughout the empire being in a "state of readiness". The alliance with Navarre helped again when Philip attempted to incite revolt in Aquitaine but failed.

Richard yielded Cyprus and left the Holy Land over a year later than Philip in October 1192, and he possibly could have retrieved his empire intact had he reached France soon after. However, during the crusade Leopold V, Duke of Austria, had been insulted by Richard, and so he arrested Richard near Vienna on his journey home. Richard had been forced to go through Austria as the path through Provence was blocked by Raymond in Toulouse. Leopold also accused Richard of sending assassins to murder his cousin Conrad, and then handed Richard over to his overlord, Emperor Henry VI.

In January 1193, Richard's brother John was summoned to Paris, where he did homage to Philip for all of Richard's lands and promised to marry Alys with Artois as her dowry. In return, the Vexin and the castle of Gisors would be given to Philip. With the help of Philip, John went to invade England and incite rebellion against Richard's justiciars. John failed and then had worse luck when it was discovered Richard was alive, which was unknown until this point. At the imperial court in Speyer, Richard was put on trial where he spoke very well for himself:

When Richard replied [to the charges against him] he spoke so eloquently and regally, in so lionhearted a manner, that it was as though he had forgotten where he was and the undignified circumstances in which he had been captured and imagined himself to be seated on the throne of his ancestors at Lincoln or Caen.

— William the Breton, Phillipidos, iv, 393-6, in Oeuvres de Rigord et de Guillaume le Breton, ed. H. F. Delaborde, ii (Paris, 1885)

Richard was to be set free after a deal was finalised in June 1193. However, whilst the discussions had been going on, Philip and John had created war in three different areas of the Angevin Empire. John had attempted to take over England, asserting that Richard would never return. The justiciars pushed his forces back to the castles of Tickhill and Windsor, which were besieged. A deal was made that allowed John to keep Tickhill and Nottingham but return his other possessions. In Aquitaine, Ademar of Angoulême claimed that he held his county directly as a fief of Philip's, not as a vassal of the duke of Aquitaine. He raided Poitou but was stopped by the local officials and captured. In Normandy, Philip had taken Gisors and Neaufles, and the lords of Aumâle, Eu, and other smaller lordships, as well as the counts of Meulan and Perche, had surrendered to Philip. Philip failed to take Rouen in April but gained other castles; Gillingham summarises "April and May 1193 were wonderfully good months for Philip".

When Philip heard of Richard's deal with Emperor Henry, he decided to consolidate his gains by forcing Richard's regents to concede with a treaty at Mantes in July 1193. Firstly, John was handed back his estates in both England and France. Secondly, Count Ademar was to be released and no Aquitanian vassals were to be charged or penalised. Thirdly, Richard was to give four major castles to Philip and pay the cost of garrisoning them, along with other compensation.

Richard failed to be reconciled with John, so John went to Philip and created a new treaty in January 1194, surrendering all of Normandy east of the Seine except Rouen and Tours and the other castles of Touraine to Philip, Vendôme to Louis of Blois, and Moulins and Bonsmoulins to Count Geoffrey of Perche. The county of Angoulême was to be independent of the Duchy of Aquitaine. The Angevin Empire was being split by John's actions. Philip continued to bargain with Emperor Henry, and the emperor cut a new deal with Richard after being offered large sums of money by Philip and John. Richard would surrender the kingdom of England to Henry, who would then give it back as a fief of the Holy Roman Empire. Richard had become a vassal of Henry. Richard was released, and whilst still in Germany he paid for the homage of the archbishops of Mainz and Cologne, the bishop of Liège, the duke of Brabant, the duke of Limburg, the count of Holland, and other lesser lords. These allies were the beginning of a coalition against Philip.

Although Philip had been granted many Norman territories, it was only nominally. In February, he captured Évreux, Neubourg, Vaudreuil, and other towns. He also received the homage of two of Richard's vassals, Geoffrey de Rancon and Bernard of Brosse. Philip and his allies were now in control of all the ports of Flanders, Boulogne, and eastern Normandy. Richard finally returned to England and landed at Sandwich on 13 March 1194.

=== Richard's return ===
Richard was in a difficult position; Philip II had taken over large parts of his continental domains and had inherited Amiens and Artois. England was Richard's most secure possession; Hubert Walter, who had been to the crusade with Richard, was appointed his justiciar. Richard besieged the remaining castle that had declared allegiance to John and not capitulated: Nottingham Castle. He then met with William the Lion in April and rejected William the Lion's offer to purchase Northumbria, to which William possessed a claim. Later, he took over John's Lordship of Ireland and replaced his justiciar.

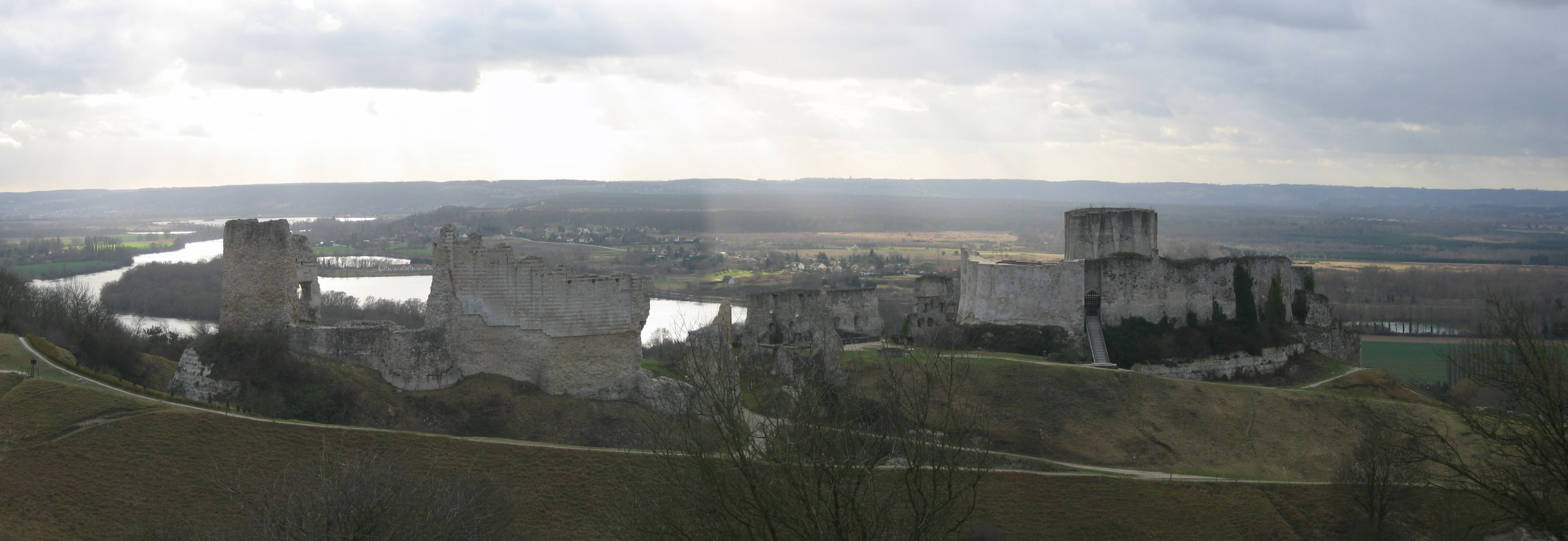
The construction of Château Gaillard began under Richard's rule, but he died before it could be seen finished.

Richard I had merely crossed the English Channel to claim back his territories that John Lackland betrayed Philip II by murdering the garrison of Évreux and handing the town down to Richard I. "He had first betrayed his father, then his brother and now our King" said William the Breton. Sancho the Strong, the future King of Navarre, joined the conflict and attacked Aquitaine, capturing Angoulème and Tours. Richard himself was known to be a great military commander. The first part of this war was difficult for Richard who suffered several setbacks, as Philip II was, as described by John Gillingham, "a shrewd politician and a competent soldier." But by October the new Count of Toulouse, Raymond VI, left the Capetian side and joined Richard's. He was followed by Baldwin IV of Flanders, the future Latin Emperor, as this one was contesting Artois to Philip II. In 1197, Henry VI died and was replaced by Otto IV, Richard I's own nephew. Renaud de Dammartin, the Count of Boulogne and a skilled commander, also deserted Philip II. Baldwin IV was invading Artois and captured Saint-Omer while Richard I was campaigning in Berry and inflicted a severe defeat on Philip II at Gisors, close to Paris. A truce was accepted, and Richard I had almost recovered all Normandy and now held more territories in Aquitaine than he had before. Richard I had to deal with a revolt once again, but this time from Limousin. He was struck by a bolt in April 1199 at Châlus-Chabrol and died of a subsequent infection. His body was buried at Fontevraud like his father.

== Collapse ==
=== John's accession to the throne ===
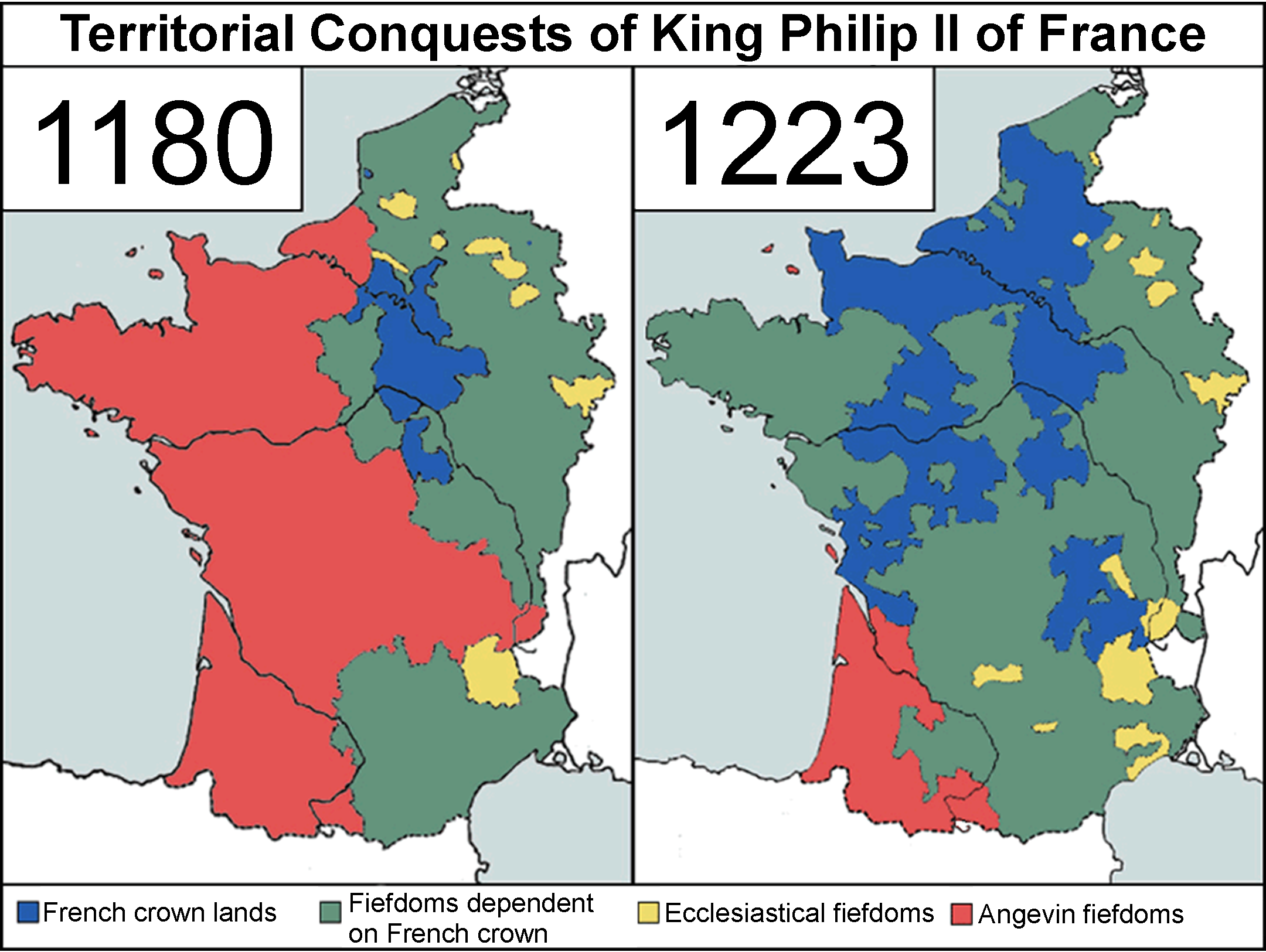
Territorial development under King Philip II between 1180 and 1223

Following the news of King Richard I's death in 1199, John attempted to seize the Angevin treasury at Chinon in order to impose his control of the Angevin government. Angevin custom, however, gave John's nephew Duke Arthur, son of Geoffrey of Brittany, a stronger claim on Richard's throne, and the nobles of Anjou, Maine, and Touraine declared in favour of Arthur on 18 April 1199. Philip II had taken Évreux and the Vexin, and a Breton army had seized Angers by this point. Le Mans refused to declare allegiance to John, so John ran to Normandy, where he was invested as duke in Rouen on 25 April. He returned to Le Mans with an army where he punished its citizens and then left for England. England had declared its support for John thanks to William Marshal and Archbishop of Canterbury Hubert Walter's support. He was crowned on 27 May in Westminster Abbey.

With his mother's support, Aquitaine and Poitou also supported John, while Anjou, Maine, Touraine, and Brittany remained disputed. In May, Aimery VII of Thouars, who was chosen by John to be his seneschal in Anjou, attacked Tours in an attempt to capture Arthur. Aimeri failed, and John was forced to return to the continent in order to secure his rule through a truce with Philip, after Philip had launched attacks on Normandy. Philip was forced into the truce because John had support from 15 French counts and from counts in the Lower Rhine, such as Count Baldwin IX of Flanders. From a position of strength, John was able to go on the offensive, and he won to his cause William des Roches, Arthur's candidate for the Angevin seneschal, following an incident with Philip. Des Roches brought Arthur and his mother Constance as prisoners to Le Mans in September, and the succession appeared to have been secured in favour of John.

John was able to make peace with Philip that secured his accession to his brother's throne. John met with Philip and signed the Treaty of Le Goulet in May 1200, where Philip accepted John's succession and Arthur became his vassal; John's concessions were to break with his German alliances, accept Philip's gains in Normandy, and cede lands in Auvergne and Berry. John was also to accept Philip as his suzerain overlord and pay Philip 20,000 marks. As Warren notes, this treaty began the practical dominance of the French king over France, and the ruler of the Angevin Empire was no longer the dominating noble in France. In June 1200, John visited Anjou, Maine, and Touraine, taking hostages from those he distrusted. In Aquitaine, he received homage from his mother's vassals, and he returned to Poitiers in August.

=== Lusignan rebellion and Anglo-French war ===
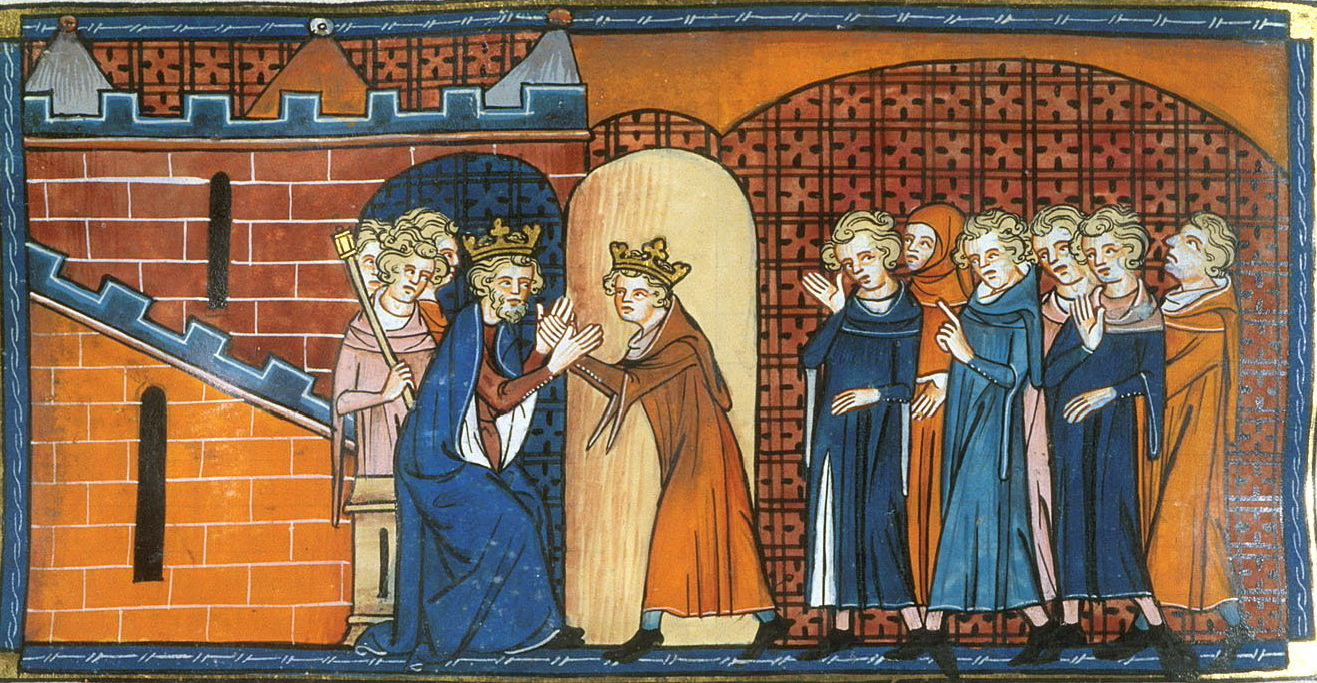
Duke Arthur I of Brittany paying homage to King Philip II of France, from the Grandes Chroniques de France

Following the annulment of John's first marriage to Isabelle of Gloucester, John married Isabella, the daughter and heiress of Count Aymer of Angoulême, on 24 August 1200. Angoulême had considerable strategic significance, and the marriage made "very good political sense", according to Warren. However, Isabella had been betrothed to Hugh of Lusignan, and John's treatment of Hugh following the marriage, including the seizure of La Marche, led Hugh to appeal to Philip. Philip summoned John to his court, and John's refusal resulted in the confiscation of John's continental possessions excluding Normandy in April 1202 and Philip accepting Arthur's homage for the lands in July. Philip went on to invade Normandy as far as Arques in May, taking several castles.

Following a message from his mother Eleanor, John rushed from Le Mans to Mirebeau, attacking the town on 1 August 1202, with William des Roches. William promised to direct the attack on condition he was consulted on the fate of Arthur, and he successfully captured the town along with over 200 knights, including three Lusignans. John captured Arthur and his sister Eleanor. John failed to consult William on Arthur's fate causing him to desert John with Aimeri and besiege Angers. Under the control of Hubert de Burgh in Falaise, Arthur disappeared and John was seen as responsible for his murder. Eleanor remained in custody until her death in 1241. The Angevin Empire was under attack in all areas, with the following year, 1203, being described as that "of shame" by Warren. In December 1203 John left Normandy never to return, and in June 1204 Normandy capitulated with the surrender of Arques, Rouen, and Verneuil. Tours, Chinon, and Loches had fallen by 1205.

On 31 March 1204 John's mother, Eleanor of Aquitaine, died, causing a rush of "most of Poitou...to do homage to the king of France". King Alfonso of Castile invaded Gascony, using the claim of his wife, John's sister Eleanor. When John went to the continent in June 1206, only the resistance led by Hélie de Malemort, Archbishop of Bordeaux had prevented Alfonso's success. By the end of John's expedition in October, most of Aquitaine was secure. A truce was made between John and Philip to last for two years. The Angevin Empire had been reduced to England, Gascony, Ireland, and parts of Poitou.

=== Return to France ===
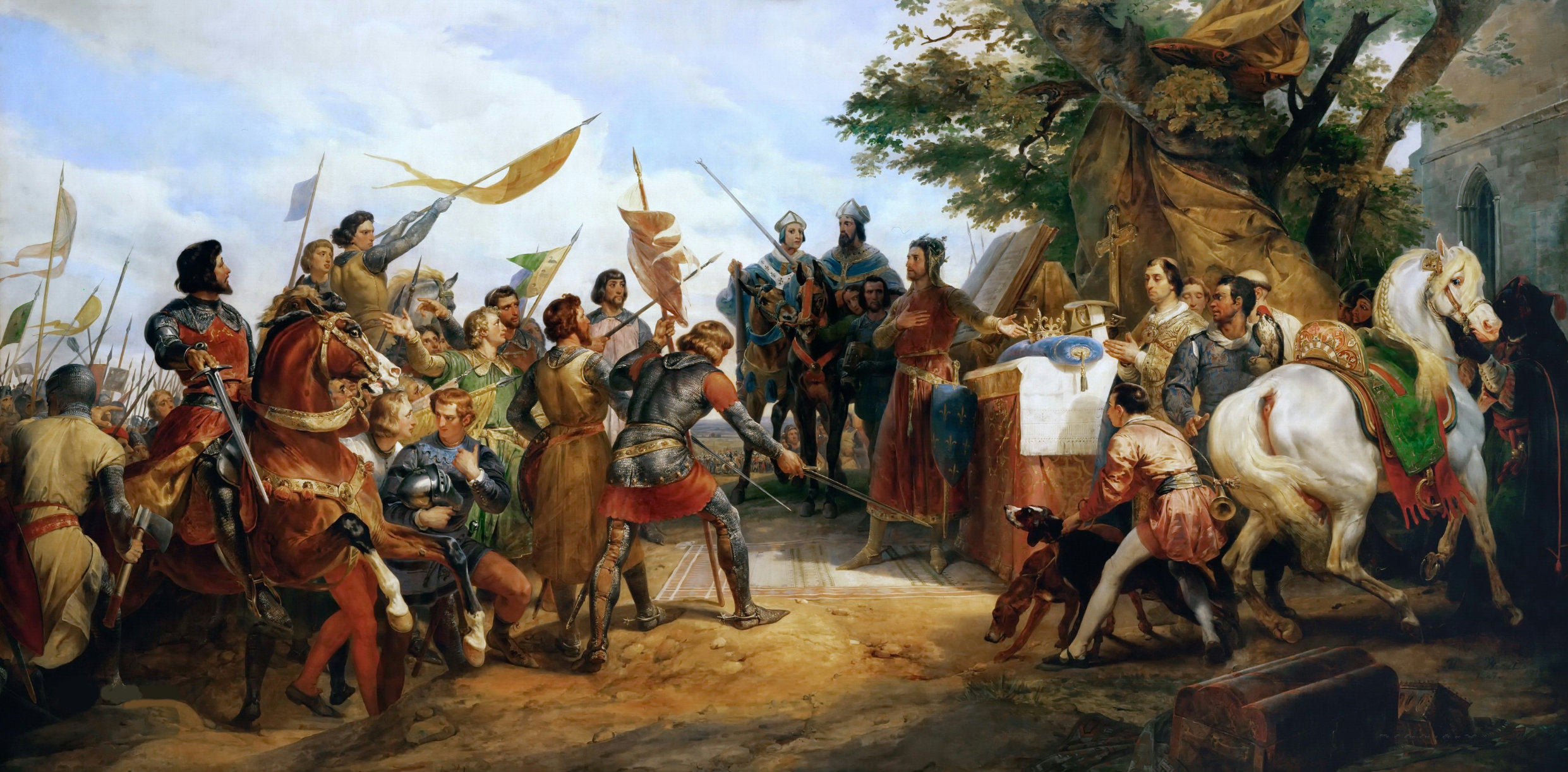
La Bataille de Bouvines, by Horace Vernet. A 19th-century depiction of Philip II of France at the Battle of Bouvines.

By the end of 1212, Philip was preparing an invasion of England. Philip aimed to crown his son Louis as king of England, and at a council at Soissons in April 1213, he drafted a possible relationship between the future France and England. On 30 May William Longespée, Earl of Salisbury, succeeded in crushing the French invasion fleet in the Battle of Damme and preventing French invasion. In February 1214, John landed in La Rochelle after creating alliances headed by Otto IV, Holy Roman Emperor. The aim was for William Longespée and John's German allies to attack Philip from the north, whilst John attacked from the south.

By June 1214, John had the support of the houses of Lusignan, Mauléon, and Thouars, but when John advanced into Anjou, capturing Angers, the desertion of his Poitevin allies forced a retreat back to La Rochelle. On 27 July, John's German allies lost the Battle of Bouvines with many prisoners taken, including Longespée. On 18 September John and Philip agreed to the Truce of Chinon that was intended to last until Easter 1220. John returned to England in October.

=== Capetian invasion of England ===
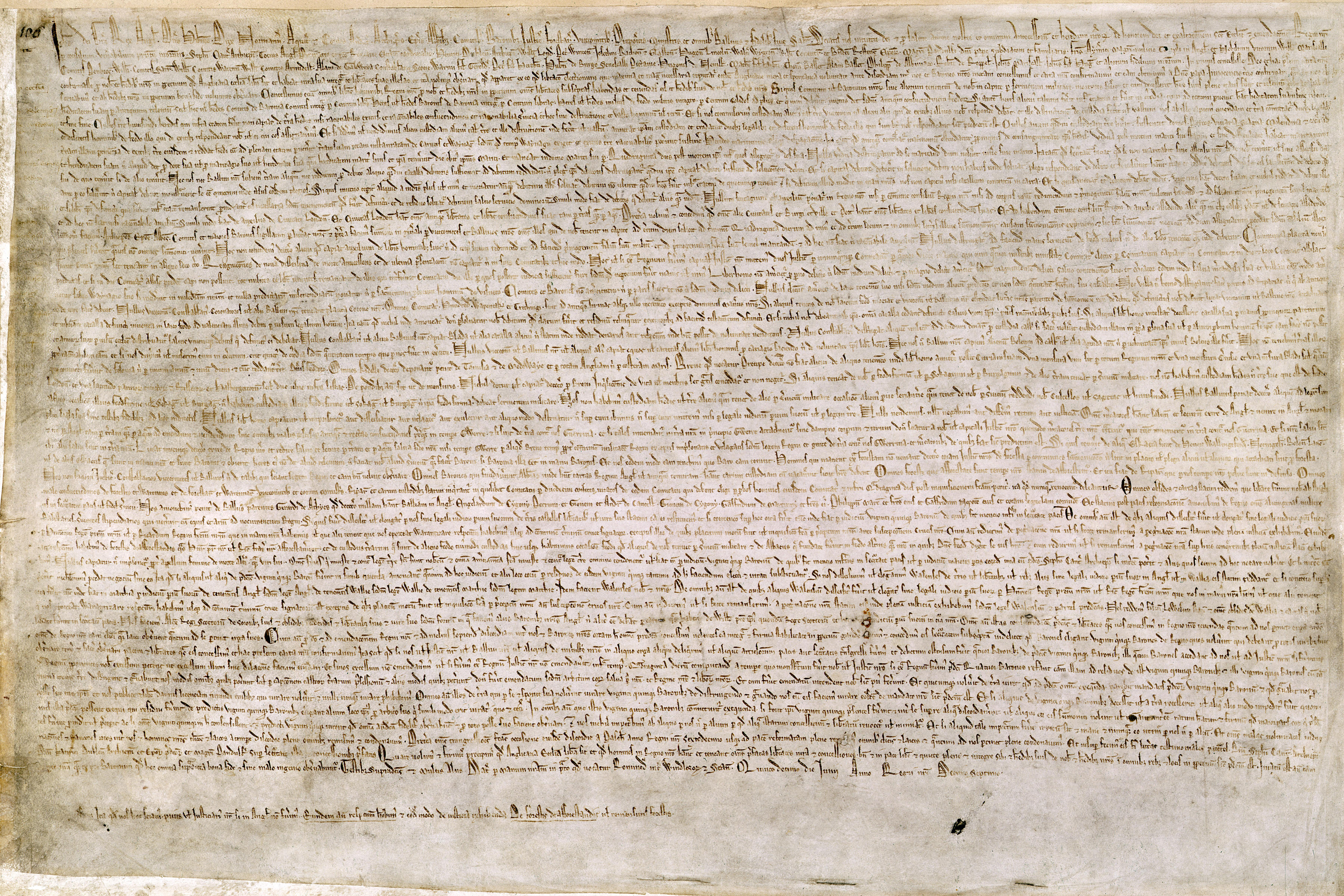
Magna Carta, signed at Runnymede on 15 June 1215

Following the agreement at Runnymede in June 1215, rebel English barons felt that John would not observe the terms of Magna Carta, and offered the English crown to Philip's son Louis. Louis accepted, landing in Kent on 21 May 1216 with 1,200 knights. Louis seized Rochester, London, and Winchester, whilst John was deserted by several nobles, including Longespée. By August only Dover, Lincoln, and Windsor remained loyal to John in the east, and Alexander II of Scotland travelled to Canterbury to pay homage to Louis.

In September, John began his attack, marching from the Cotswolds, feigning an offensive to relieve the besieged Windsor Castle and attacking eastwards around London to Cambridge to separate the rebel-held areas of Lincolnshire and East Anglia. In King's Lynn, John contracted dysentery and died on 18 October 1216. Louis was defeated twice following John's death in 1217, in Lincoln in May and at Sandwich in August, resulting in his withdrawal from the claim on the throne of England with the Treaty of Lambeth in September.

== Cultural influence ==
The hypothetical continuation and expansion of the Angevin Empire over several centuries has been the subject of several tales of alternate history. English and French historians had viewed the juxtaposition of England and French lands under Angevin control as something of an aberration and an offence to national identity. To English historians, the lands in France were an encumbrance, but French historians considered the union to be an English empire.

The 12th century brought about Gothic architecture, first known as opus francigenum, from the work of Abbot Suger at Saint Denis in 1140. The Early English Period began around 1180 or 1190, but this religious architecture was independent of the Angevin Empire. Gillingham suggests that it was only "perhaps in kitchen design" that there was a distinctively Angevin style.

Richard I's personal arms—three golden lions passant guardant on a red field—continue to appear in most subsequent English royal heraldry and in variations on the flags of both Normandy and Aquitaine. (Note: In medieval heraldry, these lions passant guardant are known as leopards) Politically, continental issues were given more attention by the Angevin kings of England than British issues had been given by the Normans. Under Angevin rule, the balance of power had dramatically shifted to France, with Angevin kings often spending more time in France than England. With the loss of Normandy and Anjou, the empire was cut in two, leaving Plantagenet descendants to be solely English kings with additional rule over Gascony.

== See also ==
- Angevin kings of England

== Bibliography ==
- Aurell, Martin (2007). L'Empire des Plantagenet [The Plantagenet Empire: 1154–1224] (in French). Translated by Crouch, David. Routledge. ISBN 978-0-582-78439-0.
- Bolton, J.L. (1999). "The English Economy in the Early Thirteenth Century". In Church, S.D. (ed.). King John: New Interpretations. The Boydell Press. ISBN 978-0-85115-736-8.
- Bradbury, Jim (1998). Philip Augustus: King of France 1180–1223. Longman. ISBN 978-0-582-06059-3.
- Carpenter, David (2003). The Struggle for Mastery. Penguin. ISBN 978-0-14-014824-4.
- Davis, R.H.C. (2013). King Stephen 1135–1154 (Paperback ed.). Routledge. ISBN 978-0-582-04000-7.
- de Diceto, Ralph (2012) [1876]. Stubbs, William (ed.). Radulfi de Diceto Decani Lundoniensis opera historica [The Historical Works of Master Ralph de Diceto, Dean of London] (in Latin). Vol. 1. Cambridge University Press. doi:10.1017/CBO9781139226271. ISBN 978-1-139-22627-1.
- Elliott, John H. (2018). Scots and Catalans: Union and Disunion. Yale University Press. doi:10.12987/9780300240719. ISBN 978-0-300-24071-9. S2CID 217335366.
- Empey, Adrian (2005). "Butler-Ormond". In Duffy, Sean (ed.). Medieval Ireland: An Encyclopedia. Routledge. ISBN 978-0-415-94052-8. Archived from the original on 24 May 2022.
- Everard, J.A. (2006). Brittany and the Angevins: Province and Empire 1158–1203. Cambridge University Press. doi:10.1017/CBO9780511496486. ISBN 978-0-521-02692-5.
- Gillingham, John (2001). The Angevin Empire (2nd ed.). Hodder Arnold. ISBN 978-0-340-74115-3.
- Gillingham, John (2002). Richard I (Paperback ed.). Yale University Press. ISBN 978-0-300-09404-6.
- Hallam, Elizabeth M. (1983). Capetian France 987–1328. Longman. ISBN 978-0-582-48910-3.
- Moss, Vincent (1999). "The Norman fiscal revolution, 1193–8". In Ormrod, Mark; Bonney, Margaret; Bonney, Richard (eds.). Crises, Revolutions and Self-sustained Growth: Essays in European Fiscal History, 1130–1830. Paul Watkins Publishing. ISBN 978-1-871615-93-7.
- Norgate, Kate (1887). England under the Angevin kings. Macmillan.
- Power, Daniel (2007). "Angevin Normandy". In Harper-Bill, Christopher; Van Houts, Elisabeth (eds.). A Companion to the Anglo-Norman World. The Boydell Press. pp. 63–85. ISBN 978-1-84383-341-3.
- Powicke, F.M. (1913). Loss of Normandy, 1198-1204: Studies in the history of the Angevin Empire. Manchester University Press.
- Reilly, Bernard F. (2003). "Alfonso VII, King of Léon-Castile". In Gerli, E. Michael (ed.). Medieval Iberia: An Encyclopedia. Routledge. ISBN 978-1-315-16159-4. Archived from the original on 24 May 2022.
- Warren, W.L. (2000). Henry II (Yale ed.). Yale University Press. ISBN 978-0-300-08474-0.
- Warren, W.L. (1997). King John (Yale ed.). Yale University Press. ISBN 978-0-300-07374-4.
