= The Cambridge Illustrated History of the Middle Ages =

Three-volume book

The Cambridge Illustrated History of the Middle Ages is a three-volume work, edited by Robert Fossier, which was first published in French in 1982 as Le Moyen Âge. It was revised and translated for the Cambridge University Press by translators including Stuart Airlie, Robyn Marsack and Janet Sondheimer.

== See also ==
- The Cambridge Medieval History
- The New Cambridge Medieval History
- The Oxford Illustrated History of Medieval Europe
