= The Shorter Cambridge Medieval History =

1952 book by Charles Previté-Orton

- The two volumes of The Shorter Cambridge Medieval History
- Author: Charles Previté-Orton (original text); Philip Grierson (revision and editorial)
- Language: English
- Genre: History
- Published: 1952
- Publisher: Cambridge University Press

The Shorter Cambridge Medieval History is a two-volume history of medieval Europe by Charles Previté-Orton (1877–1947), prepared for publication by Philip Grierson, and published by Cambridge University Press in 1952. It is a condensed and revised version of The Cambridge Medieval History which was published in eight volumes between the World Wars and, unlike that work, was intended for a general audience.

The book was generally well received despite some criticism for being too heavy on facts and neglecting the non-political aspects of medieval history such as literature and art. Others felt that it was not as easy a read as had been promised. Reviewers agreed that it was more than a mere condensing of its parent, being almost completely new material from the pen of Previté-Orton that reflected the latest developments in medieval history in the 1940s rather than the views of twenty or thirty years earlier that formed the original work. There was disquiet, however, that even such a distinguished author as Previté-Orton could not be right all the time and that the inevitable generalising statements essential in such a condensed work might be mistaken for settled facts when much about medieval history remained uncertain.

== Background ==
The history has its origins in the eight-volume Cambridge Medieval History which was published between the World Wars and of which Previté-Orton was one of the editors. In 1939, the Syndics of Cambridge University Press asked Previté-Orton to write a concise version of the earlier history which was a work of reference that in practice was too detailed and too long to be read in full. He had complete discretion to take and amend any part of the full history and to add any new material that he felt necessary. He completed the work before his death in 1947 but it was not ready for the printers, so the numismatist and historian Philip Grierson was given the task of making the final revisions prior to publication. As the work was intended for the general reader, maps and genealogical tables were added to aid understanding and Grierson split the longer chapters in Previté-Orton's manuscript to match the shorter chapters of the rest of the work.

== Publication ==
The book was published by Cambridge University Press in two hardback volumes in 1952. It was reprinted with corrections in 1953, 1960, and 1962. There were two further reprints followed by the first paperback edition in 1975. A Readers Union book club edition was published in 1955. The book is currently out of print with the university press.

== Content ==
The work contains 38 chapters, gathered into books of three or four chapters each, as well as an editorial note by Grierson, table of contents, 132 illustrations, 15 maps, 17 genealogical tables, retrospect, appendices, and an index, totalling over 1,100 pages. It covers the period from the end of the third century to the end of the fifteenth, spanning the collapse of the western Roman Empire and the "ruin" of the ancient civilisation, to the development of "conscious" nation states, the development of humanism and naturalism in the arts, the discovery of the New World and the eclipse of European commerce by an oceanic stage, preceded by the eventual collapse of the Eastern Roman Empire. The authors acknowledge the arbitrary nature of the periods chosen as being described as the Medieval period or Middle Ages, and the "crooked and perilous" road taken, but see the story, overall, as one of great progress.

- Volume I The Later Roman Empire to the Twelfth Century

Book I – The Later Roman Empire
Book II – The Break-up of the Empire
Book III – Byzantium and Islam
Book IV – The Dark Ages in the West
Book V – The Foundation of Western Europe
Book VI – The Twelfth Century

- Volume II The Twelfth Century to the Renaissance

Book VII – The Papacy at its Zenith and the Secular Kingdoms
Book VIII – The Leadership of France
Book IX – The Fourteenth Century
Book X – The End of the Middle Ages
Book XI – The Transition to Modern Times

== Reception ==
H. R. Rothwell in Antiquity welcomed the two volumes as a masterful synthesis that represented the distillation of a lifetime of study and not simply a condensing of the earlier work. He applauded the ability of Previté-Orton to fully integrate the history of east and west, even managing to weave the history of Byzantium into the overall narrative, as the original Cambridge history had been unable to achieve, thus demonstrating that where one mind was able to tell a coherent tale, it was best so done. As an overall narrative, however, in which current historical debates were not addressed and without footnotes, Rothwell worried that the general reader might underestimate the extent to which the conclusions were still tentative and how many questions remained unanswered in medieval history.

Kenneth M. Setton, in Speculum, took a contrary view, seeing the book as not long enough to adequately treat the many subjects that it had to cover, having simultaneously too much political detail for its length and not enough for an adequate account, and neglecting cultural matters. Setton observed that although Previté-Orton had discretion to take as much of the original history as he wanted, he had rarely done so and the result was a work that reflected his own views and not those of the work he had edited. The style was brisk, scholarly, dry, and to the point, and the editing careful. Errors were few but not difficult to find, and some of the content was beginning to date. In contrast to Rothwell, Setton found the coverage of Byzantine history inadequate, but he also acknowledged the ambition and scope of the work and concluded by saying that it was yet another book that he wished he had written.

William Croft Dickinson in The Scottish Historical Review, also felt that the history was too heavy on facts, thus running the risk that, as Benedetto Croce had observed, it became chronicle rather than history, but appreciated the effort of the authors nonetheless in cramming a great deal into a small space, albeit by sacrificing any bibliography and any reference to the original authors on which they had drawn. The illustrations were exceptionally well chosen by S. H. Steinberg but the maps were less successful with bold divisions that did not well reflect the reality of the porous nature of national borders in the medieval period.

Martin R. P. McGuire, in The Catholic Historical Review, welcomed the creation of a coherent overall narrative that it was possible to read in full and appreciated the extensive revising that the authors had undertaken, making it a book reflecting the state of historical enquiry in the 1940s rather than the 1910s/20s of the original work. Like other reviewers, McGuire noted that the book was heavy on political and constitutional matters and light on cultural history such as literature.

Philip C. Sturges, in The Western Political Quarterly, felt that the claim that the book could appeal to the general reader was false as it was "too encyclopedic, too arid, too packed to admit of any sustained appreciation by the public." Like other reviewers, Sturges appreciated the illustrations, disliked the maps, and lamented the lack of a bibliography and footnotes. Even admitting Previté-Orton's sterling reputation, he felt that the reader should not be expected to take his opinions on faith, particularly in a work full of necessary summaries that must have involved the author's personal judgements. Despite this, he admired the masterful distillation of so much into so little, praising, for instance, the author's descriptions of Visigothic rulers "with an economy so exact that not a word is wasted and yet not an essential lineament is omitted." Despite its flaws, the book was more than a mere condensation of its parent.

== See also ==
- The New Cambridge Medieval History
- The Oxford Illustrated History of Medieval Europe
