= Cambridge Illustrated Histories =

Series of history books

The Cambridge Illustrated Histories are a series of mostly single-volume history books written by experts and published by the Cambridge University Press. The series has a reputation of being informative with well-chosen illustrations.

== Titles ==
- Cartledge, Paul, ed. (1998). The Cambridge Illustrated History of Ancient Greece. ISBN 0-521-48196-1.
- Bahn, Paul G., ed. (1996). The Cambridge Illustrated History of Archaeology. ISBN 0-521-45498-0.
- Hoskin, Michael, ed. (1997). The Cambridge Illustrated History of Astronomy. ISBN 0-521-41158-0.
- Marshall, P.J., ed. (1996). The Cambridge Illustrated History of the British Empire. ISBN 0-521-43211-1.
- Trussler, Simon (1994). The Cambridge Illustrated History of British Theatre. ISBN 0-521-41913-1.
- Ebrey, Patricia Buckley (1996). The Cambridge Illustrated History of China. ISBN 0-521-43519-6. (2nd edition 2010; 3rd edition 2022)
- Jones, Colin (1994). The Cambridge Illustrated History of France. ISBN 0-521-43294-4.
- Kitchen, Martin (1996). The Cambridge Illustrated History of Germany. ISBN 0-521-45341-0.
- Robinson, Francis, ed. (1996). The Cambridge Illustrated History of the Islamic World. ISBN 0-521-43510-2.
- Porter, Roy, ed. (1996). The Cambridge Illustrated History of Medicine. ISBN 0-521-44211-7.
- Fossier, Robert, ed. (1997) [1982]. The Cambridge Illustrated History of the Middle Ages. (translated from the French, three volumes)
- Bahn, Paul G. (1998). The Cambridge Illustrated History of Prehistoric Art. ISBN 0-521-45473-5.
- Bowker, John, ed. (2002). The Cambridge Illustrated History of Religions. ISBN 0-521-81037-X.
- Ramage, Nancy H.; Ramage, Andrew (1991). The Cambridge Illustrated History of Roman Art. ISBN 0-521-40297-2.
- Woolf, Greg, ed. (2003). The Cambridge Illustrated History of the Roman World. ISBN 0-521-82775-2.
- Ellis, Harold (2009). The Cambridge Illustrated History of Surgery. ISBN 978-0-521-89623-8. (Revised edition of A History of Surgery, 2001)
- Parker, Geoffrey, ed. (1995). The Cambridge Illustrated History of Warfare: The Triumph of the West. ISBN 0-521-44073-4. (2nd edition 2021)
- Ronan, Colin A. (1983). The Cambdrige Illustrated History of the World's Science. ISBN 0-521-25844-8.

The Cambridge Illustrated History of Medicine was reissued without illustrations as The Cambridge History of Medicine (2006), which contains a new section in the last chapter. Similarly, The Cambridge Illustrated History of Warfare was republished as The Cambridge History of Warfare in 2005, and new editions of both appeared in 2020.

== See also ==
- Oxford Illustrated Histories
