= Patricia Buckley Ebrey =

American historian

- Born: March 7, 1947 (age 79); New Jersey, U.S.
- Education: University of Chicago (BA); Columbia University (MA, PhD)
- Spouse: Thomas G. Ebrey
- Scientific career
- Fields: Sinology (Song dynasty), Art history, Women's studies
- Workplaces: University of Illinois at Urbana–Champaign, University of Washington

Patricia Buckley Ebrey (born March 7, 1947) is an American art historian and sinologist specializing in cultural and gender issues during the Chinese Song Dynasty. Ebrey obtained her Bachelor of Arts from the University of Chicago in 1968 and her Masters and PhD from Columbia University in 1970 and 1975, respectively. Upon receiving her PhD, Ebrey was hired as visiting assistant professor at University of Illinois at Urbana-Champaign. She became an associate professor in 1982 and a full professor three years later. Subsequently, in 1997, she accepted a Professor of History position at the University of Washington, from which she retired in July 2020. She's now Professor Emerita of History at that institution.

== Honors ==
Ebrey has received a number of awards for her work, including fellowships from the National Endowment for the Humanities, the John Simon Guggenheim Memorial Foundation, the Woodrow Wilson Foundation, and the Chiang Ching-kuo Foundation. Ebrey's The Inner Quarters: Marriage and the Lives of Chinese Women in the Sung Period received the 1995 Joseph Levenson Book Prize from the Association for Asian Studies. Her 2008 work, Accumulating Culture: The Collections of Emperor Huizong, received the Smithsonian Institution's 2010 Shimada Prize for Outstanding Work of East Asian Art History. She received the American Historical Association's Award for Scholarly distinction in 2013. In 2020 she received the Association for Asian Studies' highest honor, the Distinguished Contributions to Asian Studies award.

== Selected bibliography ==
- Aristocratic Families of Early Imperial China: A Case Study of the Po-ling Ts’ui Family (1978)
- Kinship Organization in Late Imperial China, 1000-1940 (1986)
- Confucianism and Family Rituals in Imperial China: A Social History of Writing About Rites (1991)
- Marriage and Inequality in Chinese Society (1991)
- Inner Quarters: Marriage and the Lives of Chinese Women in the Sung Period (1993)
- Chinese Civilization: A Sourcebook (1993)
- The Cambridge Illustrated History of China (1996)
- A History of World Societies (1999)
- Women and the Family in Chinese History (2002)
- Accumulating Culture: The Collections of Emperor Huizong (2008)
- The Cambridge Illustrated History of China, second edition (2010)
- Emperor Huizong (2014)
- The Cambridge Illustrated History of China, third edition (2022)
