= Jim Bolton (historian) =

English medieval economic historian

James L. Bolton, FRHistS, published as J. L. Bolton but otherwise commonly known as Jim Bolton, is an English medieval economic historian. Between 1965 and 1994, he taught at Queen Mary College (now Queen Mary University of London), where he remains a Professorial Research Fellow.

== Career ==
Bolton arrived at Queen Mary in 1965 and remained on the staff until taking early retirement in 1994. As of 2018, he remains a Professorial Research Fellow there. He holds a BLitt degree from the University of Oxford, awarded in 1971 for his "Alien merchants in England in the reign of Henry VI, 1422–61", supervised by G. A. Holmes.

Bolton researches medieval economic history, with a focus on merchants and money in England (especially relating to London and its international links) and foreigners living in England during the late medieval period. According to Christopher Dyer, a professor at the University of Leicester, Bolton is a "much respected and well liked figure in London academic circles".

== Honours ==
Bolton is a Fellow of the Royal Historical Society, and was the dedicatee of a festschrift edited by Matthew Davies and Martin Allen: Medieval Merchants and Money: Essays in Honour of James L. Bolton (Institute of Historical Research, 2016).

== Selected publications ==
- Money in the Medieval English economy, 973–1489, Manchester Medieval Series (Manchester University Press, 2012). ISBN 0719050405
- "Was there a 'crisis of credit' in fifteenth-century England?" (Howard Linecar Lecture to the British Numismatic Society, 2009), British Numismatic Journal, vol. 81 (2011), pp. 144–64.
- "When did Antwerp replace Bruges as the commercial and financial centre of north-western Europe? The evidence of the Borromei ledger for 1438", The Economic History Review, vol. 61, no. 2 (2008), pp. 360–379.
- "Irish migration to England in the late middle ages: the evidence of 1394 and 1440", Irish Historical Studies, vol. 32, no. 125 (2000), pp. 1–21.
- The Alien Communities of London in the Fifteenth Century: The Subsidy Rolls of 1440 and 1483–4 (Richard III and Yorkist History Trust/Paul Watkins, 1998).
- "'The world upside down': Plague as an agent for social and economic change", in M. Ormrod and P. Lindley (eds.), The Black Death in England (Paul Watkins, 1996), pp. 17–78.
- "The City and the Crown, 1456–61", The London Journal, 12 (1986), pp. 11–24.
- The Medieval English Economy, 1150–1500 (London: Dent, 1980).
