= The Oxford Illustrated History of Modern China =

2016 edited volume by Jeffrey Wasserstrom

- Editors: Jeffrey Wasserstrom
- Authors: Anne Gerritsen; Rana Mitter; Robert Bickers; S.A. Smith; Richard Curt Kraus; William A. Callahan; Ian Johnson
- Language: English
- Subject: History, Geopolitics
- Genre: Nonfiction
- Published: 2016
- Publisher: Oxford University Press
- Publication place: United Kingdom
- Media type: Hardcover
- Pages: 361
- ISBN: 978-0199683758
- OCLC: 925499976

The Oxford Illustrated History of Modern China is an edited volume by Jeffrey Wasserstrom, an American historian of Modern China.

== Overview ==
The book begins by setting the stage with an exploration of China's late imperial era, examining the social, political, and cultural dynamics of the Ming and Qing dynasties. It then delves into the dramatic transformation that took place in the 19th century with the encounter with Western powers, including the Opium Wars and the tumultuous Taiping and Boxer rebellions.

As the narrative progresses, it delves into the complex processes of political, economic, and social change in the 20th century, offering insights into the fall of the Qing dynasty, the rise of the Republic of China, and the subsequent establishment of the People's Republic of China under Communist rule. It provides a nuanced examination of the Chinese Communist Party's ascent to power, the transformative policies of Mao Zedong, the Great Leap Forward, the Cultural Revolution, and their lasting impact on the nation.

The book also explores China's engagement with the outside world, including its relationship with the Soviet Union, the Sino-Soviet split, and the opening up of China under Deng Xiaoping's reform and opening up. It delves into the 1989 Tiananmen Square protests and massacre, the challenges of economic modernization, and the emergence of China as a global power in the 21st century.

== Reception ==
Tim Chamberlain writes for the London School of Economics' blog, "Focusing predominantly on the political and economic aspects of China’s history and thereby contextualising its present place in the globalised community of nations, this book forms an excellent introduction to the history of modern China for the general reader and student alike."

Writing for Asian Review of Books, Jonathan Chatwin writes, "Perhaps most useful for the non-specialist, however, is the integration within the text of a few hundred aptly chosen images, maps, paintings and diagrams, which help immeasurably in contextualizing and solidifying the historical narrative."
