= The Oxford Illustrated History of Medieval Europe =

1988 non-fiction history book

The Oxford Illustrated History of Medieval Europe cover

The Oxford Illustrated History of Medieval Europe is a history of medieval Europe, first published by Oxford University Press in 1988 under the editorship of George Holmes. It is divided into six chapters by different authors, covering the period 400 to 1500 AD, each of which has either a northern or southern Europe focus. Reviewers welcomed the editor's decision to have only six tightly-focused chapters rather than the many divisions of other works, and felt that the structure of the book worked well, sufficient in itself as a history of the European medieval period and giving the reader enough background to explore the subject in more depth in other works. Despite the non-traditional structure, however, the book was criticised as perhaps too conservative in its perspective and neglecting a number of areas of growing importance in historical enquiry such as the role of women.

== Publication ==
The book was first published, in hardback, by Oxford University Press in 1988 under the editorship of George Holmes, a fellow of St Catherine's College, University of Oxford. There was a paperback edition in 1990, a book club edition, an electronic edition, and a DAISY version for the blind. A version with reduced illustrations was published under the variant title The Oxford History of Medieval Europe in 1992. The original text was republished in paperback by Oxford in 2001.

== Content ==
The book consists of a foreword by George Holmes, a list of the contents, colour plates, and maps; and six chapters by different historians. There is an editor's postscript, list of further reading by chapter, chronology, acknowledgments, and an index, making 398 pages in all. The book is illustrated throughout in colour and black and white.

In the foreword, Holmes explains his view that Western civilisation was formed in medieval Europe, with its centre of gravity gradually moving from the south to the north and from the east to the west, so that the most advanced centres in 400 AD might be Rome or Constantinople, but by 1300 they were in north-western Europe. An accompanying trend was the recession of empires like that of Rome's in favour of smaller centres of power and wealth which were in constant competition, thus provoking outbursts of creativity.

There then follows an overview of the history of medieval Europe in six chapters spanning the period 400 to 1500 AD:

1. The transformation of the Roman Mediterranean, 400–900 – Thomas Brown
2. The northern world in the Dark Ages, 400–900 – Edward James
3. The society of Northern Europe in the High Middle Ages, 900–1200 – David Whitton
4. Northern Europe invades the Mediterranean, 900–1200 – Rosemary Morris
5. The Mediterranean in the age of the Renaissance, 1200–1500 – Peter Denley
6. The civilization of courts and cities in the north, 1200–1500 – Malcolm Vale

Holmes concludes the book with his editor's postscript, contrasting the civilisation of Europe in 400 based on empires with that of 1500 which was based on the wealth created by flourishing agriculture and industry, the product of the competition of 100 centres of cultural and political power.

== Reception ==
Alexander Murray, writing in History Today, felt that the book was one for the study, not the coffee table, and contrasted Holmes's decision to provide six focused chapters of about 60 pages each with the approach taken in Charles Previté-Orton's Shorter Cambridge Medieval History which contained 38 chapters. He also approved of the decision to divide the period in question into three and into chapters with northern and southern focuses. He particularly appreciated David Whitton's discussion of the relations between noble dynasties and the church and monarchies in chapter three and the device that several writers used of adopting the viewpoint of a relevant figure such as Rosemary Morris's use of a Byzantine diplomat in chapter four.

William D. Carpe in Church History saw the book as an antidote to the belief that the Middle Ages were a period of ignorance and barbarism, sufficient in itself as a history of the period, but also a primer that enables the reader to pursue a more detailed study of any subject or period of the Middle Ages.

David A. Warner in The History Teacher noted that the division into northern and southern chapters generally reflected reality at the time, although there were some cross-European issues that therefore failed to receive a coherent treatment. Whilst the structure of the book was not traditional, its perspective was, with little attention paid to issues such as the role of women and groups outside the mainstream such as the Jews, although current historical debates such as the Pirenne thesis were acknowledged. Warner also felt that for an illustrated history, there was a lack of coverage of the role of art and architecture in the period with Gothic art receiving little attention. Warner describes the book as clearly intended for the general reader and therefore including many maps and dispensing with footnotes, but also including some anachronistic words and a number of words and phrases that made the text more lively but seemed out of place in a work on the medieval period, such as "blitzkrieg".

Nicholas Hooper in History, identified some patchiness and omissions in the text with the coverage of Spain uneven and little about Scandinavia and Eastern Europe, but acknowledged that the task of the authors to compress over 1,000 years into 350 pages was difficult. He felt that the book had value but needed more interpretation and that it was not the ideal one-volume history of the period needed in schools and by first-year undergraduates, but accepted that "perhaps that book can never be written".

== See also ==
- The Cambridge Medieval History
- The Cambridge Illustrated History of the Middle Ages
- The New Cambridge Medieval History
