= Bonsmoulins =

- Commune
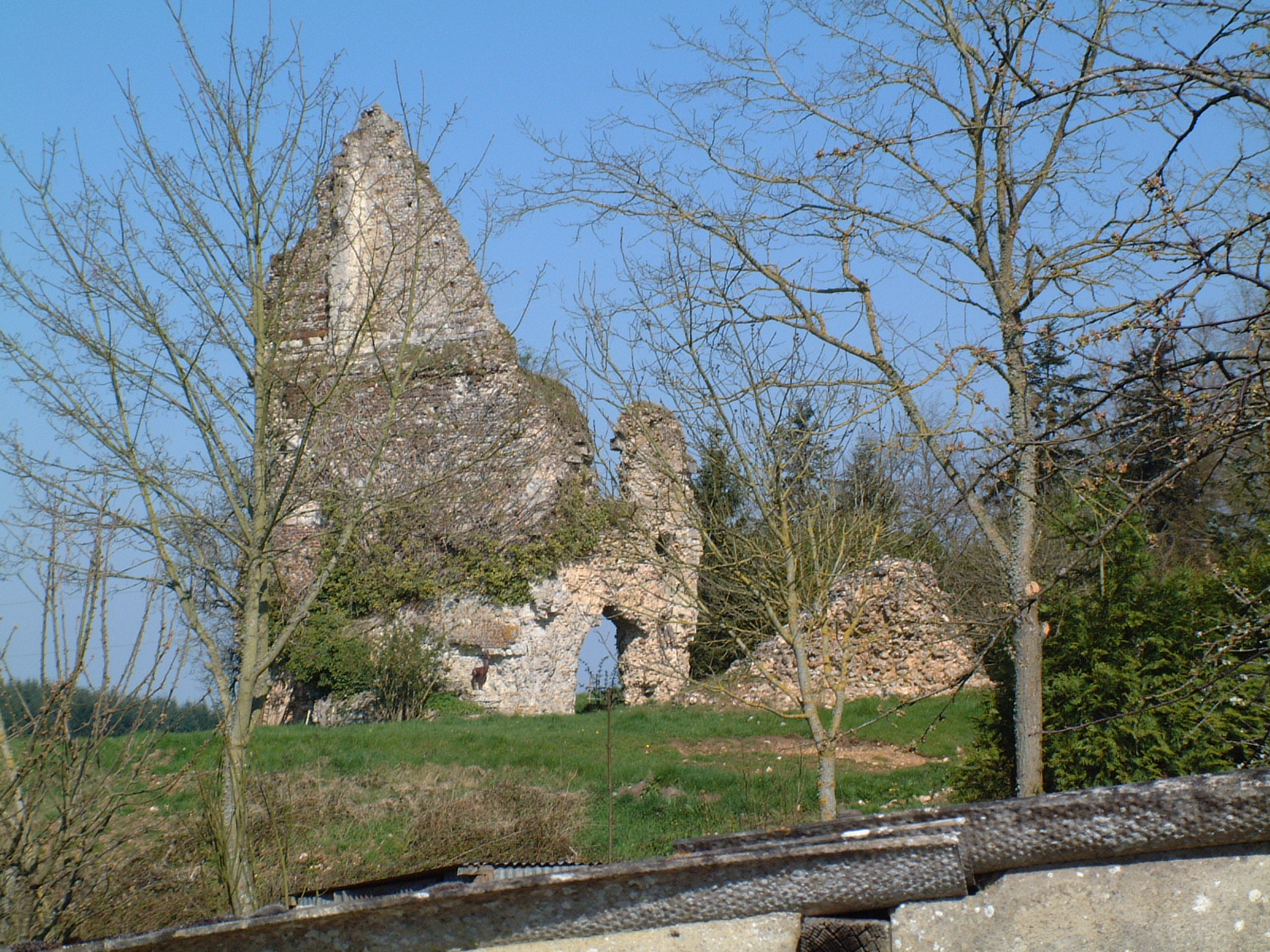
- Ruins of the château

- Coat of arms
- Location of Bonsmoulins
- Location within France Location within Normandy
- Coordinates: 48°39′04″N 0°32′12″E
- Country: France
- Region: Normandy
- Department: Orne
- Arrondissement: Mortagne-au-Perche
- Canton: Tourouvre au Perche

Government
  - Mayor (2020–2026): Eric Zo
- Area^{1}: 7.57 km^{2} (2.92 sq mi)
- Highest elevation: 291 m (955 ft)
- Lowest elevation: 223 m (732 ft)
- Population (2023): 232
  - Density: 30.6/km^{2} (79.4/sq mi)
- Time zone: UTC+01:00 (CET)
  - Summer (DST): UTC+02:00 (CEST)
- INSEE/Postal code: 61053 /61380
- ^{1} French Land Register data, which excludes lakes, ponds, glaciers > 1 km^{2} (0.386 sq mi or 247 acres) and river estuaries.

Bonsmoulins (French pronunciation: [bɔ̃mulɛ̃]) is a commune in the Orne department in northwestern France.

== Geography ==
The commune is made up of the following collection of villages and hamlets, Les Beslières, Les Audions, Les Goutiers, La Conardière, Bonsmoulins and Les Aillebouts.

The Commune along with another 70 communes shares part of a 47,681 hectare, Natura 2000 conservation area, called the Forêts et étangs du Perche.

Two rivers, the Sarthe and the Iton flow through the commune.

== Population ==
Historical population
Year	Pop.	±% p.a.
1968	204	—
1975	176	−2.09%
1982	144	−2.83%
1990	156	+1.01%
1999	213	+3.52%
2007	219	+0.35%
2012	253	+2.93%
2017	240	−1.05%
2023	232	−0.56%
Source: INSEE

== Heraldry ==
Arms of Bonsmoulins	The arms of Bonsmoulins are blazoned : Gules, a tower Or open, pierced and masoned sable, issuant from a base azure charged with a millwheel argent. (possibly non-official)

== See also ==
- Communes of the Orne department
