= The Cambridge Medieval History =

History book series

The Cambridge Medieval History, Vol IV, The Byzantine Empire Part I: Byzantium and its Neighbours, 1966.

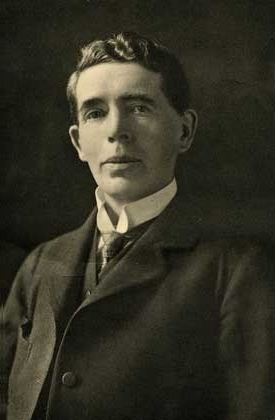
John Bagnell Bury, architect of the history.

The Cambridge Medieval History is a history of medieval Europe in eight volumes published by Cambridge University Press and Macmillan between 1911 and 1936. Publication was delayed by the First World War and changes in the editorial team.

== Origins ==
The work was planned by John Bagnell Bury, Regius Professor of Modern History at Cambridge University, along lines developed by his predecessor, Lord Acton, for The Cambridge Modern History. The first editors appointed were Henry Melvill Gwatkin, Mary Bateson, and G. T. Lapsley. James Pounder Whitney replaced Mary Bateson following her death in 1906. When G. T. Lapsley retired due to ill health, his place was not filled so that the editors of the first two volumes were Gwatkin and Whitney.

== Scope ==
In the preface to the first volume, the editors expressed the wish that the work would be an interesting read for the general user as well as "a summary of ascertained facts, with indications (not discussions) of disputed points". They claimed, "there is nothing in the English language resembling the present work" and wrote, optimistically, that they "hoped to publish two volumes yearly in regular succession". In fact, the final volume was not published until 1936.

The history aimed to encompass the whole of European medieval history so that the editors were obliged to use a wide range of contributors in order to adequately treat the subject. In particular in relation to volume 2 (The Rise of the Saracens and the Foundation of the Western Empire) the editors complained that "students of history in this country [England] seldom turn their attention to any part of it" and thus "very little has ever been written in English, [on subjects] such as the Visigoths in Spain, the organisation of Imperial Italy and Africa, the Saracen invasions of Sicily and Italy, and the early history and expansion of the Slavs".

== Volumes ==
Volumes one and two were published in 1911 and 1913, keeping to the expectation of the editors that the work would move through its volumes at a fast pace.

Volume three, however, was delayed until 1922 by the First World War, which made international collaboration more difficult, and after German scholars had been replaced by British ones due to worries about how the volume would be received in Britain. Some went unpaid as they had signed no contract. A collection was organised for the great German Latinist Max Manitius which raised £10 after he wrote that the war had left him in poverty. Contributors to volumes four and six were similarly affected. Writing in the preface to volume II of The New Cambridge Medieval History in 1995, Rosamond McKitterick commented on the "unhappy legacy of the old volume III when the principles of scholarship were sullied with political enmities and many scholars excluded as authors because of their nationality", a fault that she felt was expunged in the new history.

The editors of volume three were Gwatkin, Whitney, Joseph Robson Tanner, and Charles William Previté-Orton. The volume was criticised in review for duplication in its coverage of events and definitions, and a failure to cross-reference material, but later commentators saw this as the inevitable consequence of the structure of the work as a collection of scholarly essays drawn from a range of international contributors over 25 years, disrupted by war and changes of editor, rather than an organic synthesis prepared by a small group over a short time-frame.

Volumes four to seven (1923–32) were edited by Tanner, Previté-Orton and Zachary Nugent Brooke (1883-1946) after Brooke replaced Whitney on his retirement. After Tanner died in 1931, volume eight (1936) was completed by Previté-Orton and Brooke.

In 1966 and 1967, a new edition of volume four was published in two parts edited by Joan Hussey that incorporated developments in the field of Byzantine studies in the forty years since the original was published.

Cambridge Medieval History Volume 3. PDF file.

- Vol. I: The Christian Roman Empire and the Foundation of the Teutonic Kingdoms, 1911.
- Vol. II: The Rise of the Saracens and the Foundation of the Western Empire, 1913.
- Vol. III: Germany and the Western Empire, 1922 (from 814 to c. 1050)
- Vol. IV: The Eastern Roman Empire 717-1453, 1923.
- Vol. IV: The Byzantine Empire Part I: Byzantium and its Neighbours, 1966. (new edition)
- Vol. IV: The Byzantine Empire Part II: Government, Church and Civilization, 1967. (new edition)
- Vol. V: Contest of Empire and Papacy, 1926. The introduction begins "The century and a half, roughly from 1050 to 1200, with which this volume is concerned..."
- Vol. VI: Victory of the Papacy, 1929. "This volume contains a general introduction, thirteen narrative chapters mostly running from c. 1200 to c. 1270, and twelve chapters on wider aspects of the middle ages."
- Vol. VII: Decline of Empire and Papacy, 1932. The introduction states that it "covers, roughly speaking, the fourteenth century".
- Vol. VIII: The close of the Middle Ages, 1936.

== See also ==
- The Cambridge Ancient History
- The New Cambridge Medieval History (1995–1999)
- The Oxford Illustrated History of Medieval Europe
- The Shorter Cambridge Medieval History
