= Jeffrey Wasserstrom =

American historian of modern China

- Education: University of California, Santa Cruz (BA); Harvard University (MA); University of California, Berkeley (PhD)
- Occupation: Historian
- Writing career
- Language: English, Chinese
- Genre: History
- Subjects: Sinology, Social history

Jeffrey N. Wasserstrom is an American historian and sinologist who is the Chancellor's Professor of History at the University of California, Irvine. Wasserstrom's research interests focus on modern China, and began with the role of student protest and have grown to include the Chinese social history and comparative history.

== Education ==
Wasserstrom received a B.A. from the University of California, Santa Cruz in 1982, a M.A. from Harvard University in 1984, and a Ph.D from the University of California, Berkeley in 1989.

== Career ==
Before joining the faculty at the UC Irvine in 2006, Wasserstrom taught at the University of Kentucky and Indiana University. In 2009, Wasserstrom became editor of Journal of Asian Studies.

In his first monograph, Student Protests in the 20th Century: The View from Shanghai, Wasserstrom pays particular attention to symbols used by student protesters in Shanghai. Wasserstrom argues that students became particularly good at mimicking the practices of government officials, which made their causes seem legitimate. David Strand praised the monograph as a "major contribution" because it "offers a model for rethinking the late imperial, Republican and Communist periods as a historical unit conditioned by indigenous and global forces, and explained by Sinological and comparative models."

In 2009, Routledge published Wasserstrom's book Global Shanghai, an analysis of the globalization of Shanghai during seven 25-year periods, and of the popular image of Shanghai as the hub of cultural interaction between China and other countries since 1850. Wasserstrom argues that, while historians should be suspicious of those who propagate this image, they should not underestimate the city's potential for cultural innovation. Alongside these books, Wasserstrom has written articles for, and edited, several anthologies.

Wasserstrom has lamented that Westerners know very little about China, and has written extensively for a popular audience in Time magazine, Newsweek, The Nation, the Los Angeles Times, and The New York Times. He is also the co-founder of a blog, the China Beat, and has written for the Huffington Post.

Wasserstrom's book China in the 21st Century: What Everyone Needs to Know was first published in 2010 and a second edition came out in 2013. The book contains an overview of recent Chinese history and includes his attempts to counter what he sees as western misunderstandings about China, including misunderstandings about the Tiananmen Square protests of 1989 and China's one-child policy. Wasserstrom argues that the most common misunderstanding of China is that China is culturally homogeneous. Wasserstrom's view is that, like the United States, China has enormous ethnic, cultural, and religious diversity. The book also contains an overview of the issues that China was facing at the time of writing. The book had mixed reviews. Barrett L. McCormick, for instance, had some misgivings about Wasserstrom's claim that Mao Zedong was, like Andrew Jackson, a man of the people who committed some atrocities, but McCormick concluded that "if someone asks you to recommend a first book on China that he or she can read on the plane, this is the best book available."

== Publications ==
- Vigil: Hong Kong on the Brink. Columbia Global Reports, 2020.
- China in the 21st Century: What Everyone Needs to Know. Oxford University Press, 2010 and 2013.
- Chinese Characters: Profiles of Fast-Changing Lives in a Fast-Changing Land. University of California Press, 2012.
- China in 2008: A Year of Great Significance. Rowman & Littlefield, 2009.
- Global Shanghai, 1850–2010. Routledge, 2008.
- "Beijing Games Call to Mind Our Fair." Chicago Tribune, September 2, 2008.
- "What Would Mao Think of the Games?" The Nation, August 22, 2008.
- "China's Brave New World--And Other Tales for Global Times." Indiana University Press, 2007.
- "New Ways in History, 1966-2006." History Workshop Journal 64, no. 1, 2007: 271-294.
- Human Rights and Revolutions, second edition, edited with Lynn Hunt, Marilyn B. Young and Greg Grandin. Rowman and Littlefield, 2007, ISBN 0742555135.
- Chinese Femininities Chinese Masculinities. University of California Press, 2002.
- The Oxford Illustrated History of Modern China, 1996.
- Popular Protest and Political Culture in Modern China. Westview Press, 1992 and 1994 editions.
- Student Protests in Twentieth-Century China: The View from Shanghai. Stanford University Press, 1991.

== Bibliography ==
- Bailey, Paul. "Student Protests in 20th Century China." Bulletin of the School of Oriental and African Studies, University of London 56, no. 3 (1993):621-622.
- "Jeffrey Wasserstrom." Amazon. Accessed April 22, 2014. https://www.amazon.com/Jeffrey-N.-Wasserstrom/e/B001IQWGPW
- "Jeffrey Wasserstrom." The Huffington Post. Accessed April 21, 2014. http://www.huffingtonpost.com/jeffrey-wasserstrom/.
- "Jeffrey Wasserstrom." UC Irvine Department of History. Accessed April 21, 2014. http://www.humanities.uci.edu/history/faculty_profile_wasserstrom.php.
- Strand, David. "Student Protests in Twentieth-Century China: The View from Shanghai by Jeffrey Wasserstrom." The Journal of Asian Studies 51, no. 3 (August 1992): 660-662.
- McCormick, Barret L. "China in the 21st Century: What Everyone Needs to Know." The Journal of Asian Studies 70, no. 1 (February 2011): 216-218.
- "The Journal of Asian Studies (JAS)." The Association for Asian Studies. https://www.asian-studies.org/publications/JAS.htm.
- Wasserstrom, Jeffrey. China in the 21st Century: What Everyone Needs to Know. New York: Oxford University Press, 2010.
- Wasserstrom, Jeffrey. Global Shanghai, 1850-2010. New York: Routledge, 2009.
- "Who We Are." The China Beat. Accessed April 21, 2014. http://www.thechinabeat.org/?page_id=7.
