= The New Cambridge Medieval History =

Book series

Volume I of The New Cambridge Medieval History

The New Cambridge Medieval History is a history of Europe from 500 to 1500 AD published by Cambridge University Press in seven volumes between 1995 and 2005. It replaced The Cambridge Medieval History in eight volumes published between 1911 and 1936.

The first volume was the last to be published, in 2005, due to the death of scholars before their chapters were delivered and the tardiness of others in keeping to deadlines which caused the revision of a number of the chapters that had been submitted on time. The intended chapter on the Romans and Lombards in Italy was omitted after the editors gave up waiting for it to be delivered, while Michael Toch, by contrast, produced a draft of his chapter on the Jews in Europe in two weeks.

Writing in the preface to volume II in 1995, Rosamond McKitterick commented on the "unhappy legacy of the old volume III (Germany and the Western Empire) when the principles of scholarship were sullied with political enmities and many scholars excluded as authors because of their nationality", a fault that she felt was expunged in the new history.

== Volumes ==
- Volume 1, c.500–c.700. Edited by Paul Fouracre. 2005.
- Volume 2, c.700–c.900. Edited by Rosamond McKitterick. 1995.
- Volume 3, c.900–c.1024. Edited by Timothy Reuter. 1999.
- Volume 4, c.1024–c.1198, Part 1. Edited by David Luscombe, Jonathan Riley-Smith. 2004.
- Volume 4, c.1024–c.1198, Part 2. Edited by David Luscombe, Jonathan Riley-Smith. 2004.
- Volume 5, c.1198–c.1300. Edited by David Abulafia. 1999.
- Volume 6, c.1300–c.1415. Edited by Michael Jones. 2000.
- Volume 7, c.1415–c.1500. Edited by Christopher Allmand. 1998.

== See also ==
- The Oxford Illustrated History of Medieval Europe
