= List of titles in the Home University Library of Modern Knowledge =

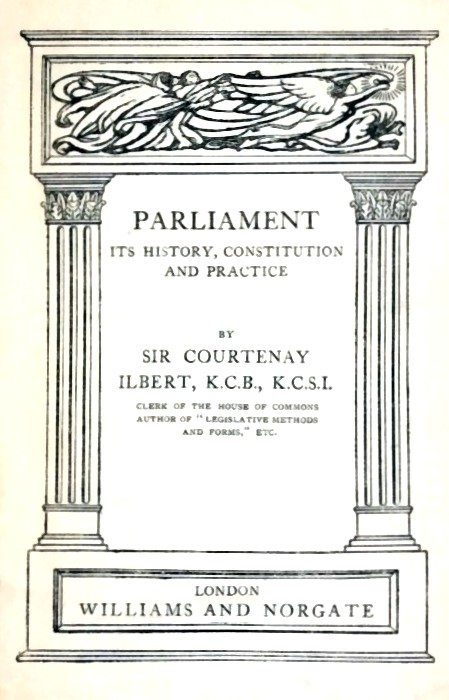
The title page of the first book in the series, Parliament: Its History, Constitution and Practice by Courtenay Ilbert, 1911.

This is an incomplete list of titles in the Home University Library of Modern Knowledge: (series number in brackets where known)

== A to ==
- Agriculture by William Somerville
- Ancient Art and Ritual by Jane Ellen Harrison (70)
- The Ancient East by David George Hogarth
- Ancient Greek Literature by Maurice Bowra
- The Animal World by Frederick William Gamble (12)
- An Anthology of English Poetry: Wyatt to Dryden by Mrs. F. E. A. Campbell (134)
- Anthropology by R.R. Marett
- Architecture by Martin S. Briggs
- Astronomy by Arthur R. Hinks (23)
- Banking by Walter Leaf
- Belgium by R. C. K. Ensor (95)
- The British Empire by Basil Williams (129)
- British Prehistory by Stuart Piggott
- The Byzantine Empire by Norman H. Baynes (114)
- Canada by Arthur Granville Bradley (34)
- Chaucer and his times by Grace E. Hadow (81)
- Christianity by Edwyn Bevan
- The Church of England by Edward William Watson, 1914.
- The Civilization of China by H. A. Giles (19)
- The Civilization of Japan by J. Ingram Bryan (127)
- The Civilization of Spain by J.B. Trend
- Climate and Weather by Henry Newton Dickson
- Commercial Geography by Marion I. Newbigin (105)
- Communism by Harold J. Laski
- Comparative Religion by J. Estlin Carpenter (60)
- Conservatism by Hugh Richard Heathcote Cecil
- Co-partnership and Profit-sharing by Aneurin Williams
- Dante by Jefferson B. Fletcher (101)
- The Dawn of History by Sir John Linton Myres (26)
- Diplomacy by Harold George Nicolson
- Dr. Johnson and His Circle by John Bailey (59)
- Drama by Ashley Dukes (117)

== E to I ==
- Egypt by E. A. Wallis Budge (110)
- Electricity by Gisbert Kapp (53)
- Elizabethan Literature by J. M. Robertson (89)
- England under the Tudors and Stuarts, 1485-1688 by Keith Feiling (120)
- English Constitutional History by S.B. Chrimes (199)
- The English Language by Logan Pearsall Smith (40)
- English Literature: Medieval by W.P. Ker (45)
- English Literature: Modern by G.H. Mair
- English Philosophy Since 1900 by G.J. Warnock
- The English Reformation to 1558 by T. M. Parker
- The English Revolution 1688–1689 by G. M. Trevelyan (188)
- The English Village by William Pearson Baker
- Ethics by G.E. Moore (52)
- Eugenics by A.M. Carr-Saunders (120)
- Euripides and his age by Gilbert Murray (73)
- Evolution by J. Arthur Thomson and Patrick Geddes (14)
- The Evolution of Plants by Dukinfield Henry Scott (9)
- Exploration of the Alps by Arnold Lunn (86)
- The French Revolution by Hilaire Belloc (3)
- Gas and Gases by R. M. Caven (119)
- Germany of To-day by Charles Tower (72)
- Great Writers of America by William Peterfield Trent and John Erskine (48)
- The Growth of Europe by Grenville A. J. Cole (84)
- THe History of England by A. F. Pollard (33)
- History of England, 1688-1815 by E.M. Wrong (121)
- History of England, 1815-1939 by James Butler (128)
- A History of Freedom of Thought by J.B. Bury (74)
- History of Our Time, 1885-1911 by G.P. Gooch (also 1885-1913 and 1885-1914) (20)
- History of Scotland by Robert Rait (110)
- The Human Body by Arthur Keith
- The Industrial Revolution, 1760-1830 by T.S. Ashton
- An Introduction to Mathematics by Alfred North Whitehead (21)
- Irish Nationality by Mrs J.R. Green, 1911. (6)

== J to N ==
- Jesus of Nazareth by Charles Gore (137)
- Karl Marx: His Life and Environment (1939) by Isaiah Berlin (189)
- Landmarks in French Literature by G. L. Strachey (31)
- Latin America by William R. Shepherd
- Liberalism by L.T. Hobhouse
- The Literature of Japan by J. Ingram Bryan
- The Literature of Germany by J. G. Robertson (64)
- The Literature of the Old Testament by George Foot Moore
- The Making of the Earth by John Walter Gregory (54)
- Man: A History of the Human Body by Arthur Keith (56)
- Master Mariners by John R. Spears (51)
- Matter and Energy by Frederick Soddy (43)
- Medieval England, 1066-1485 by Sir Maurice Powicke
- Medieval English Literature by W. P. Ker (45)
- Medieval Europe by H. W. C. Davis (13)
- Milton by John Bailey (97)
- Modern English Literature by G. H. Mair (27)
- Modern Geography by Marion Newbigin (7)
- Mohammedanism by D.S. Margoliouth
- Music by W.H. Hadow (109)
- Napoleon by H.A.L. Fisher (57)
- The Navy and Sea Power by David Hannay (94)
- The Negro by W.E. Burghardt Du Bois
- The Newspaper by G. Binney Dibblee (58)
- Nineteenth Century European Civilization by Geoffrey Bruun

== O to P ==
- The Ocean: A General Account of the Science of the Sea by Sir John Murray (76)
- The Opening Up of Africa by H. H. Johnston (18)
- Our Forerunners by M. C. Burkitt
- An Outline of Russian Literature by Maurice Baring (99)
- Painters and Painting by Frederick Wedmore (62)
- The Papacy and modern times by William Francis Barry (22)
- Parliament: Its History, Constitution and Practice, by Courtenay Peregrine Ilbert, 1911. (1)
- Patriotism in Literature by John Drinkwater (106)
- Peoples and Problems of India by T. W. Holderness (36)
- The Philosophy of Aristotle by Donald James Allan, 1952. (222)
- The Poet Chaucer by Nevill Coghill
- Poland by W. Alison Phillips (100)
- Polar Exploration by William S. Bruce (8)
- Police by John Coatman
- Political Consequences of the Great War by Ramsay Muir
- Political Thought in England, 1848-1914 by Sir Ernest Barker (104)
- Political Thought in England from Bacon to Halifax by G.P. Gooch
- Political Thought in England from Locke to Bentham by Harold Laski
- Political Thought in England: Tyndale to Hooker by Christopher Morris, 1953. (225)
- Political Thought in England: The Utilitarians from Bentham to Mill by William Leslie Davidson, 1915.
- Practical Ethics by Herbert Louis Samuel, 1st Viscount Samuel
- Prehistoric Britain by Robert Munro, 1913. (82)
- The Principles of Physiology by John Gray McKendrick (42)
- The Problems of Philosophy by Bertrand Russell, 1912. (35)
- Psychical research by Sir William Fletcher Barrett (24)
- Psychology by William McDougall (41)

== Q to Z ==
- Races of Africa by Charles Gabriel Seligman (144)
- Religion and Science by Bertrand Russell
- Religious Development Between the Old and New Testaments by Robert Henry Charles
- The Renaissance by Edith Sichel (87)
- Rome by W. Warde Fowler (30)
- Science in Antiquity by Benjamin Farrington
- Sociology by Morris Ginsberg
- The Science of Wealth by J.A. Hobson
- Serbia by L. F. Waring (102)
- Shakespeare by Peter Alexander
- Shelley, Godwin, and Their Circle by Henry Noel Brailsford (75)
- A Short History of War and Peace by G.H. Perris, 1911. (4)
- The Socialist Movement by James Ramsay MacDonald, 1911. (10)
- Statistics by L.H.C. Tippett
- St. Paul by Arthur Darby Nock (186)
- The Study of Geography by John M. Mogey, 1950. (214)
- Town and Country Planning by Patrick Abercrombie (163)
- The Victorian Age in Literature by G. K. Chesterton (61)
- Wales by W. Watkin Davies (108)
- Warfare in England by Hilaire Belloc
- The Wars Between England and America by T.C. Smith, 1914. (82)
- The Wealth of England from 1496 to 1760 by Sir George Clark
- William Blake by H.M. Margoliouth, 1951.
- William Morris: His Work and Influence by A. Clutton Brock (83)
- William Shakespeare by John Masefield (2)
- Wordsworth and Coleridge 1795-1831, H.M. Margoliouth, 1953. (223)
- World History from 1914 to 1950 by David Thomson, 1954.
- Writing English Prose by William T. Brewster (66)
