= Birkbeck Lecture in Ecclesiastical History =

The Birkbeck Lectures in Ecclesiastical History have been held at Trinity College, Cambridge, since 1886.

== Lectures ==
The source for the list below is: "Past Birkbeck Lectures", Trinity College, Cambridge. Retrieved 25 September 2024.

Year	Lecturer	Lecture title
1886	William Cunningham	The Conversion of the Germans
1891	James Bass Mullinger	Temporal Power of the Papacy: Its Origins and Results
1892	James Bass Mullinger	Schools of Theology at Cambridge
1896	William Holden Hutton	The Church in the Sixth Century
1898	Arthur Cayley Headlam	The Credibility of Early Church History
1900	John Neville Figgis	Political Theories and Ecclesiastical Parties from the Council of Constance to Grotius
1902	John Henry Overton	The Nonjurors
1905	Walter Howard Frere	The History of the Religious Orders in England
1907	Thomas Scott Holmes	The History of the Christian Church in the Province of Gaul
1908	Thomas Scott Holmes	The Church in Roman Gaul in the Fifth Century
1909	William Cunningham	Religion in England during the Eighteenth and Nineteenth Centuries
1911	George Gordon Coulton	Monasticism from St Bernard to the Reformation
1912	George Gordon Coulton	Some Aspects of Medieval Church Art
1913	Reginald L. Poole	Outlines of the History of the Papal Chancery
1913	William John Birkbeck	
1920	Terrot R. Glover	Inheritance and Experience in Early Christian Thought
1921	Cuthbert H. Turner	The Sources and Material of Early Western Canon Law
1924	James Vernon Bartlet	Church Life and Order in the First Four Centuries
1925	Alexander James Carlyle	The Principles of the Relation of Church and State in the Middle Ages
1926	Alexander James Carlyle	The Papacy and the Temporal Powers in the Thirteenth Century
1927–1929	Hugh Fraser Stewart	Jansenist and Jesuit in the Seventeenth Century
1929–1930	Zachary N. Brooke	The English Church and the Papacy from William I to John
1932–1933	Norman Sykes	Church and State in England in the Eighteenth Century
1934–1935	A. Hamilton Thompson	The English Church at the Opening of the Sixteenth Century
1936–1937	E. F. Jacob	The Council of Constance
1938	Charles H. E. Smyth	The Origins of the Evangelical Revival in Cambridge in the Eighteenth Century
1939	Norman H. Baynes	Byzantine Asceticism
1946	Francis Dvornik	Church and State in the East
1947	Ernest Gordon Rupp	Luther Reconsidered
1948	William Abel Pantin	The English Church in the Fourteenth Century
1948	Canon John R. H. Moorman	The Grey Friars in Cambridge
1949	Stephen C. Neill	India and Christianity in the Nineteenth Century
1951	Henry Outram Evennett	The Counter-Reformation
	Margaret Deanesley	The Work of the Western Clergy as Transmitters of the Greco-Roman Tradition in Early Medieval Europe
1953	Canon Alec Vidler	Lamennais, the Church, and the Revolution
1954	Stanley Lawrence Greenslade	Six Early Christian Cities of the West
1955	Kathleen Wood-Legh	The Chantry as an Institution in Medieval Britain
1956	W. Owen Chadwick	The Idea of Development: From Bossuet to Newman
1957	Thomas Maynard Parker	God, Man and Politics in Later Medieval Thought
1958	Gordon Donaldson	The Scottish Reformation
1959	Derwas J. Chitty	Egyptian and Palestinian Monasticism under the Christian Empire
1960	Sir Richard Southern	St Anselm and His Friends
1961	Prince Dmitri Obolensky	The Orthodox Church in the Medieval Slavonic Lands
1962	David Knowles	Two Problems in Monastic History: Regula Magistri and Carta Caritatis
	Charles Holwell Talbot	Cluniac Monasticism: Odo to Peter the Venerable
1963	Robert William Greaves	Politics and the Hanoverian Church of England
1965	Henry Chadwick	Athanasius and the Arian Controversy
1966	Sir Steven Runciman	The Church in Constantinople and the Protestant Churches in the Sixteenth and Seventeenth Centuries
1967	George S. R. Kitson Clark	Churchmen and the Social Problem: 1835–1885
1968	W. H. C. Frend	The Rise of the Monophysite Empire: Some Chapters in the History of the Church in the Fifth and Sixth Centuries
1969	Walter Ullmann	The Carolingian Renaissance and the Idea of Kingship
1970	Denys Hay	The Church in Italy in the Fifth Century
1971	A. G. Dickens	The German Reformation
1972	David Newsome	Platonic Ideas in English Romantic Thought and Theology
1973	John Norman Davidson Kelly	Aspects of St Jerome
	J. M. Wallace-Hadrill	The Franks and the Uses of Religion
1974	Basil Hall	The Rise and Fall of Spanish Erasmianism
1976	John McManners	Death and the Enlightenment: Changing Attitudes to Death in Eighteenth-Century France
1977	Donald M. Nicol	The Church and Society in the Last Centuries of Byzantium
1978	Michael J. Wilks	God's Half Acre: Nationalism and the English Church in the Fourteenth Century
1979	Edward Norman	Themes in the History of Latin-American Christianity
1981	Patrick Collinson	The Beginnings of Non-Conformity: Popular Protestantism and Religious Dissent in Sixteenth- and Seventeenth-Century England
1983	Gareth V. Bennett	The Restored Church of England, 1600–1689
1985	Brian Tierney	Natural Law and Natural Rights: Languages of Discourse, 1150–1350
1987	John Dixon Walsh	Methodism Attacked: The Opposition to Popular Evangelicalism in Eighteenth-Century England
1990	C. N. L. Brooke	Religion and Learning in Cambridge, 1860–1960
1993	Derek Beales	Lazy Monks and Philosophic Spoilers: European Monasteries in the Age of Revolution
1995	John Bossy	Moral Tradition and Counter-Reformation
1997	Diarmaid MacCulloch	Reformation as Adventure: The England of Edward VI
1999	Peter Linehan	Culture and Society in Thirteenth-Century Castile: The Life and Times of Archbishop "Gudiel" of Toledo
2001	Adrian Hastings	Died before he gave the lecture
2004	Richard Carwardine	"Shall a Nation Be Born at Once?": Evangelical Religion in the Construction of the United States, 1776–1865
2005	Patricia Crone	Civic Religion and Rationalist Thought: The Classical Tradition in the Near East Before and After the Rise of Islam
2007	Eamon Duffy	Inventing the Counter-Reformation
2009	J. D. Y. Peel	Christianity, Islam, and the Yoruba: World Religions in Comparison and Interaction
2011	Guy G. Stroumsa	Scriptures, Paideia, and the Religious Revolution of Late Antiquity
2013	Simon Green	The Rise and Fall of the Faithful City: Christianisation and Dechristianisation in England, 1850–1950
2015	Barbara D. Metcalf	Islam in South Asia
2018	Julia Smith	Christianity in Fragments: The Formation of the Cult of Relics, c. 300–800
2022	Gilles Kepel	The History of Modern Jihad, from the Middle East to Europe, 1973-2022
2023	Richard Payne	The First Iranians: Religion, Empire and Ethnicity in Late Antiquity

== See also ==
- Lees Knowles Lecture
- Tarner Lectures
