= Chris Morris =

Chris or Christopher Morris may refer to:

== Sportspeople ==
- Chris Morris (footballer) (born 1963), former professional footballer who played for the Republic of Ireland
- Chris Morris (basketball) (born 1966), retired American basketball player
- Chris Morris (Canadian football) (born 1968), Canadian football offensive lineman for the Edmonton Eskimos
- Chris Morris (American football, born 1983), American football guard and center for the Tennessee Titans
- Chris Morris (American football, born 1949), American football tackle for the Cleveland Browns
- Chris Morris (cricketer) (born 1987), South African cricketer
- Christopher Cale Morris (born 1996), American ice hockey player

== Others ==
- Christopher Morris (soldier) (c. 1490–1544), military administrator during the rule of Henry VIII
- Christopher Morris (historian) (1906–1993), British historian
- Christopher Morris (news presenter) (born 1938), BBC and Sky News journalist
- Christopher Morris (accountant) (1942–2015), English accountant
- Chris Morris (author) (born 1946), science fiction and fantasy author; musician
- Christopher W. Morris (born 1949), philosophy professor
- Christopher Morris (photographer) (born 1958), American photojournalist
- Chris Morris (satirist) (born 1962), English satirical comedian, writer, and director
- Chris Morris (journalist) (born 1964), BBC world affairs correspondent and author of The New Turkey
- Chris Morris (music writer) (active since 1980s), Los Angeles–based music writer
- Chris Morris (activist) (born 1979), gay rights activist

== See also ==
- Christopher Norris (disambiguation)
