= Ethics (Moore book) =

1912 book by G. E. Moore

- 1965 edition
- Author: G. E. Moore
- Publisher: Williams and Norgate; Oxford University Press (United Kingdom); Henry Holt and Company (United States)
- Publication date: 1912

Ethics is a book about ethics by G. E. Moore first published in 1912. It endorses a version of consequentialism.

Moore wrote Ethics around age 40 while living with his sisters in Richmond (then part of Surrey). Soon thereafter, he went back to the University of Cambridge to become a lecturer. He wrote part of it in mid-1911 while staying at a cottage that Lytton Strachey had rented. Ethics and Principia Ethica (1903) are Moore's only two books about ethics. In a 1952 autobiographical essay, Moore wrote that he preferred Ethics to Principia "because it seems to me to be much clearer and far less full of confusions and invalid arguments".

Ethics was first published in 1912 as part of the Home University Library of Modern Knowledge by Williams and Norgate in the United Kingdom and Henry Holt and Company in the United States. It was the 52nd book in the Home University Library Series. Oxford University Press reprinted Ethics after acquiring the series and issued a US edition in 1965.

Thomas Baldwin argues that Ethics represents a retreat from Moore's earlier confidence regarding ethical intuitionism and the method of isolation, a technique for extracting moral intuitions that Moore relies on in Principia Ethica. The third chapter of Ethics argues against expressivism, rejecting the view that "right" and "wrong" mean merely that the speaker approves or disapproves the action described with those words.

According to William Frankena, Moore, in Ethics and Philosophical Studies, moves away from the version of consequentialism that he endorses in Principia Ethica. Instead, Frankena suggests, the Moore of these later works may favour a form of consequentialism according to which there is a necessary connection between the promotion of goodness and rightness. Robert Peter Sylvester reads the entire work as a defence of the view that "the test of right or wrong is determined by the actual consequences of voluntary actions chosen by the agent"; William Shaw, who edited a reprint of Ethics, agrees with Sylvester's interpretation. Sylvester understands the version of consequentialism in Ethics to be the same as that for which Moore argues in Principia.

== Works cited ==
- Ambrose, Alice; Lazerowitz, Morris, eds. (1970). G. E. Moore: Essays in Retrospect. Allen & Unwin; Humanities Press. ISBN 978-0-04-192023-9. OCLC 1149215880.
- Baldwin, Thomas (1990). G. E. Moore. Routledge. ISBN 0-415-00904-9. OCLC 19922230.
- Cooke, Harold P. (October 1913). "Review of Ethics". Mind. 22 (88): 552–556. doi:10.1093/mind/XXII.10.552. ISSN 0026-4423. JSTOR 2248627.
- Schilpp, Paul Arthur, ed. (1952). The Philosophy of G.E. Moore. Tudor Publishing Company. OCLC 1150949106.
- Shaw, William H., ed. (25 August 2005). Ethics. Oxford University Press. doi:10.1093/0199272018.001.0001. ISBN 978-0-19-927201-3.
- Sylvester, Robert Peter (1990). The Moral Philosophy of G. E. Moore. Temple University Press. pp. 119–122. ISBN 978-1-4399-0169-4. OCLC 472409433.
- Waterlow, Sydney (April 1913). "Review of Ethics". International Journal of Ethics. 23 (3): 340–345. doi:10.1086/intejethi.23.3.2376676. ISSN 1526-422X. JSTOR 2376676.
