= Ethica =

Ethica is the Latin word for ethics. Ethica may refer to:

- Ethics (Spinoza)
- Ethics (Abelard)

== See also ==
- Ethics (disambiguation)
