= Ethics (disambiguation) =

Ethics is a branch of philosophy that involves systematizing, defending, and recommending concepts of right and wrong conduct.

Ethics may also refer to:

- Ethics, a text on ethics by Peter Abelard
- Ethics (Bonhoeffer book), an unfinished book by Dietrich Bonhoeffer, published in 1949
- Ethics (journal), a quarterly philosophical journal
- Ethics (Spinoza book), a 17th-century book by Baruch Spinoza
- "Ethics" (Star Trek: The Next Generation), a 1992 episode of Star Trek: The Next Generation
- Ethics (Watsuji book), a 1937 book by Tetsuro Watsuji
- Ethics: Origin and Development, a 1921 book by Peter Kropotkin
- Nicomachean Ethics or The Ethics, a work by Aristotle
- Ethics, a 1912 book by G. E. Moore
- ETHICS a methodology for the design and implementation of computer-based information systems devised by Enid Mumford

== See also ==
- Animal ethics, human–animal relationships and how animals ought to be treated
- Applied ethics, the branch of ethics concerned with the analysis of particular moral issues in private and public life
- Business ethics, ethical principles and moral or ethical problems that can arise in a business environment
- Medical ethics, a system of moral principles that apply values to the practice of clinical medicine and in scientific research
