= Norman Sykes (priest) =

The Very Reverend Norman Sykes, DD, DLitt, FBA Dean of Winchester
- Born: 17 May 1897; Liversedge, West Yorkshire, England
- Died: 20 March 1961 (aged 63)

Academic background
- Education: Heckmondwike Grammar School; University of Leeds
- Alma mater: The Queen's College, Oxford
- Thesis: Edmund Gibson, Bishop of London (1669–1748) (1922)
- Doctoral advisor: Edward William Watson
- Other advisors: Arthur James Grant; Charles Firth

Academic work
- School or tradition: Evangelical school of church history
- Institutions: King's College London (1924–31); University College of the South West of England (1931–33); Westfield College (1933–1944); The Queen's College, Oxford (1943–45); University of Cambridge (1945–1958)
- Doctoral students: Roland Oliver

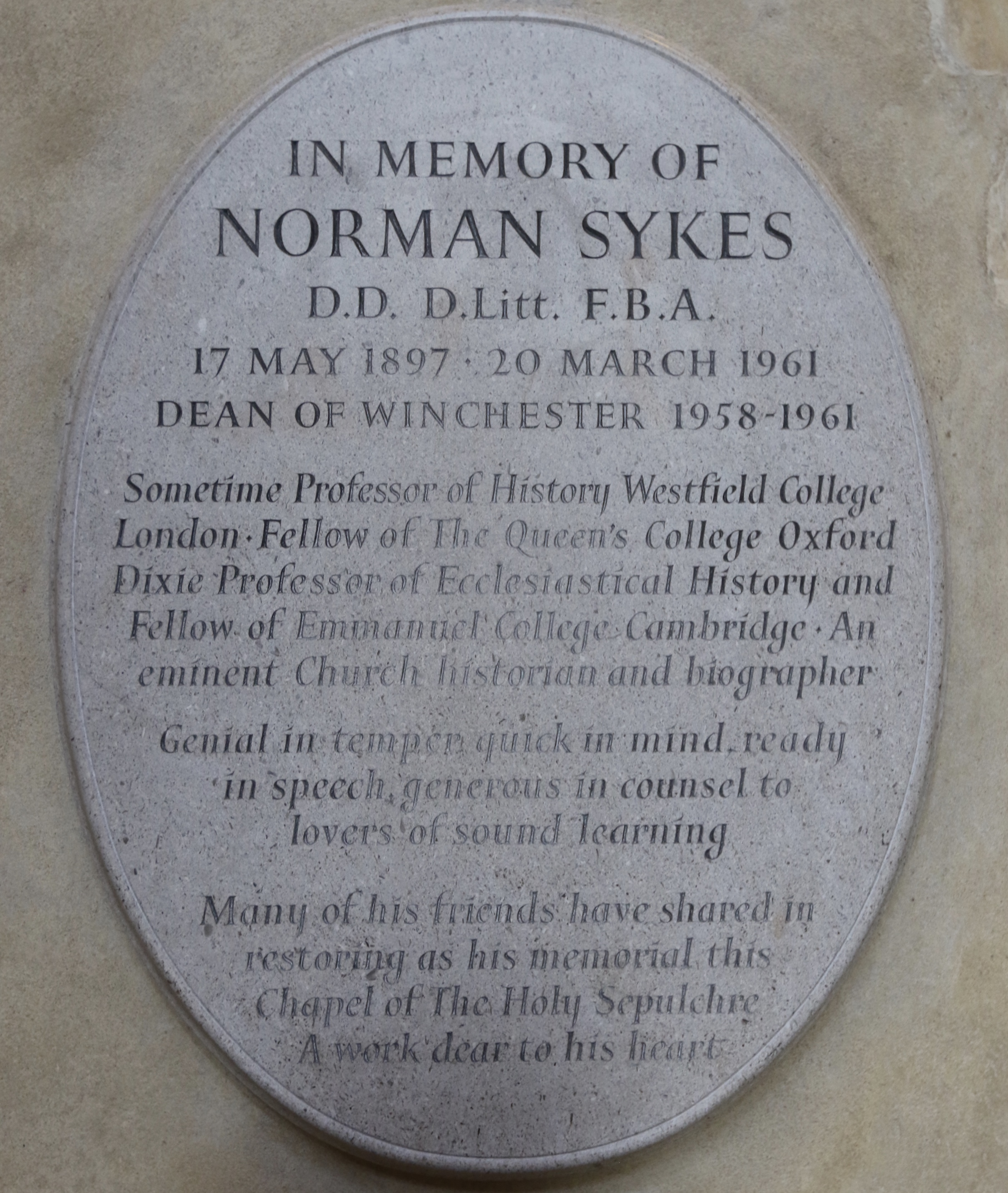
Memorial in Winchester Cathedral

Norman Sykes FBA (17 May 1897 – 20 March 1961) was a priest in Anglican orders and a distinguished ecclesiastical historian, sometime Professor of History, Westfield College, London, sometime Fellow of The Queen's College, Oxford, Dixie Professor of Ecclesiastical History at the University of Cambridge (1944) and Dean of Winchester 1958-1961 .

== Biography ==
Born into a family rooted in the Yorkshire moorlands, Sykes was the only son of the stonemason Percy Sykes and Eliza. He was educated at the Heckmondwike Grammar School. He graduated with first-class honours in history from the University of Leeds, where he took inspiration from Arthur James Grant and – for an ecclesiastical career – from John Neville Figgis; by 1920, he went on a Lady Elizabeth Hastings scholarship to study at The Queen's College, Oxford while residing at Ripon Hall in Parks Road. He completed his thesis on Edmund Gibson, Bishop of London (1669–1748), a topic suggested to him by the principal of Ripon Hall Henry Major, under the supervision of Edward William Watson in 1922. He also achieved first-class honours in theology at Oxford in 1923.

He was ordained as a priest of the Church of England and took up a lectureship in church history at King's College London in 1924. From 1931 to 1933, he was Professor of History at the University College of the South West of England and Birkbeck Lecturer in Ecclesiastical History at Trinity College, Cambridge. He was considered a strong contender to replace his former supervisor as the Regius Professor of Ecclesiastical History at the University of Oxford in 1934, but his candidacy met with opposition from the dean of Christ Church, Henry Julian White. He then held a professorship in history at the Westfield College for eleven years from 1933 (the college was evacuated to Oxford during World War II), while also serving as the canon-theologian of Liverpool Cathedral from 1937 to 1943, and as a fellow and praelector in theology and modern history at the Queen's College, Oxford, from 1943 to 1945.

He was appointed as the Dixie Professor of Ecclesiastical History at the University of Cambridge in 1944. (Note: Or in 1945, according to his British Academy biography, which mentions Sykes giving his inaugural lecture on the 61st anniversary of the election of Mandell Creighton as the first Dixie Professor in 1884.) He was a fellow of Emmanuel College, Cambridge from 1944 to 1958 and an honorary fellow from 1958 to 1961. He exercised the duties of the proctor in convocation for the university from 1945 to 1958.

Sykes was elected a fellow of the British Academy in 1951. After delivering the Ford Lectures at Oxford in 1958, he was the Wiles Lecturer at Queen's University Belfast in 1959, and gave the Montefiore Memorial Lecture in 1960.

He was Dean of Winchester from 1958 to 1961, dying of cancer while in office.

== Work ==
Over the course of his career, Sykes emerged as a leading historian of the Church of England. In the words of the Jesuit theologian Joseph Crehan, he was "the chief representative of the evangelical school of Church historians in England" during his active years. According to the church historian Garry Bennett, Sykes raised the academic standards of ecclesiastical history through his rigorous approach.

In his monograph on the career of Edmund Gibson, bishop of London from 1723 to 1748, Sykes intended to demonstrate the continuity of English ecclesiastical statesmanship beyond the execution of Archbishop William Laud through an account of Gibson's "efforts to bind the clergy by ties of material interest to the cause of the Hanoverian dynasty, and to create a Church–Whig alliance to replace the tradition of loyalty to the Stuart line which had involved the Church in difficulties when James II was expelled from England". A major achievement of his early work was to propose a more positive re-evaluation of the eighteenth-century Church of England, considered revisionist with regard to the Victorian view. While he did not build a school of historians around himself, his "revisionist" approach was later taken up by the students of Garry Bennett, John Walsh, and Geoffrey Rowell during the 1970s and 1980s. Sykes' influential Church and State in England in the XVIIIth Century (1934) set the agenda for several generations of historians, but has been criticised for its "neglect of ideology and theology".

His effective use of archives was demonstrated with the papers of William Wake held at Christ Church, Oxford prior to publication of his two-volume work devoted to that archbishop (1716–1737).

In 1960, Sykes argued that in historical scholarship "the object to be discovered is not the mere event but the thought expressed in it".

== Main publications ==
- Edmund Gibson, Bishop of London, 1669–1748: A Study in Politics and Religion in the Eighteenth Century, London: Humphrey Milford, 1926
- Church and State in England in the XVIIIth Century, Cambridge: Cambridge University Press, 1934 (based on the Birkbeck Lectures, 1931–1933)
- "The Ideal of a National Church", in Norman Sykes et al., The Church and the Twentieth Century, London: Macmillan, 1936
- The Crisis of the Reformation, London: The Unicorn Press, 1938 (based on the lectures at Liverpool Cathedral)
- The English Religious Tradition: Sketches of Its Influence on Church, State, and Society, London: SCM Press, 1953 (rev. edn. 1961)
- Old Priest and New Presbyter: The Anglican Attitude to Episcopacy, Presbyterianism and Papacy since the Reformation, Cambridge: Cambridge University Press, 1956
- William Wake, Archbishop of Canterbury 1657–1757, 2 vols., Cambridge: Cambridge University Press, 1957
- From Sheldon to Secker: Aspects of English Church History 1660–1757, Cambridge: Cambridge University Press, 1959 (based on the 1958 Ford Lectures)
- Man as Churchman, Cambridge: Cambridge University Press, 1960 (based on the 1959 Wiles Lectures at Belfast)

== Personal life and views ==
Sykes married Betsy Farrow of Rochdale, a fellow lecturer in history at KCL, in 1927.

He was reluctant to reveal his personal religious convictions, but he was "not opposed" to the Oxford Movement, critical of episcopalianism, and known to admire David Knowles, a Benedictine and Sykes's contemporary as the Regius Professor of Modern History at Cambridge.

== Sources ==
- Bezzant, James S. (1961), "The Very Reverend Norman Sykes, 1897–1961" (PDF), Proceedings of the British Academy, 47: 416–428
- Sykes, Norman (1926), Edmund Gibson, Bishop of London, 1669–1748: A Study in Politics and Religion in the Eighteenth Century, London: Humphrey Milford

Church of England titles
Preceded by Gordon Selwyn	Dean of Winchester; 1958–1961	Succeeded by Oswin Harvard Gibbs-Smith
