= Theodore Clarke Smith =

American professor (1870–1960)

Theodore Clarke Smith (1870–1960) was professor of American history at Williams College from 1903 to 1938. Smith was an educationalist and curriculum reformer who served on the Committee on Curriculum of 1911-1927 and the Advisory Committee of 1911-1935.

He wrote the often-cited The Wars Between England and America (1914) and produced a two volume life and letters of U.S. President James Abram Garfield (1925).

Smith contributed to the debate about the future of American historiography that took place in the American Historical Association and elsewhere. He was critical of the approach taken by James Harvey Robinson who, Smith argued, did not "consider it necessary to be impartial or even fair."

An archive of his correspondence with Harry A. Garfield is held at Williams College.

== Selected publications ==
- The Liberty and Free soil Parties in the Northwest. Toppan prize essay of 1896, Longmans, Green, and Co., New York, 1897. (Harvard Historical Studies, Vol. 6)
- Parties and slavery, 1850-1859, Harper & Brothers, New York & London, 1906.
- The Wars Between England and America, Williams and Norgate, London, Henry Holt and Co., New York, 1914. (Home University Library of Modern Knowledge, No. 82)
- The Life and Letters of James Abram Garfield, Yale University Press, New Haven, 1925. (2 vols.)
- The United States as a factor in world history, H. Holt and Co., New York, 1941.
