= George Binney Dibblee =

Newspaperman and academic and manager of Manchester Guardian

George Binney Dibblee (1868 – 27 August 1952) was a newspaperman and academic who was manager of the Manchester Guardian and a noted authority on the idea of supply and demand.

== Selected publications ==
- The Laws of Supply and Demand, with Special Reference to Their Influence on Over Production and Unemployment, Constable, London, 1912.
- The Newspaper, Williams & Norgate, London, 1915. (Home University Library of Modern Knowledge)
- The Psychological Theory of Value, Constable, London, 1924.
- Instinct and Intuition. A Study in Mental Duality, Faber & Faber, London, 1929.
