= Michael W. Flamm =

American historian (born 1964)

Michael W. Flamm (born April 10, 1964) is an American historian and author best known for his work on post-1945 United States political history. He was a professor of history at Ohio Wesleyan University. He is the author of Law and Order: Street Crime, Civil Unrest, and the Crisis of Liberalism in the 1960s (2005) and In the Heat of the Summer: The New York Riots of the 1964 and the War on Crime (2016) He was an elected member of the Organization of American Historians.

== Life and education ==
Flamm was raised in Minnesota, where he became an avid fan of the Vikings, Twins, and Timberwolves. He completed his undergraduate studies at Harvard University in 1986, graduating with a B.A. He then pursued graduate studies at Columbia University, earning a Ph.D. in 1998.

== Career ==
Flamm spent five years as a high school teacher in New Jersey and New York. He also served as a provost at Columbia University. He then joined the History Department at Ohio Wesleyan University, where he has taught since 1998.

Flamm was elected in 2019 to a three-year term on the executive board of the Organization of American Historians. He has also served on various committees and consulted for the National Endowment for the Humanities, College Board, and National Academy of Sciences.

== Research and Scholarship ==
His research and study focuses on post‑1945 U.S. political history. His publications include The Chicago Handbook for Teachers: A Practical Guide to the College Classroom (1999, co-authored with Alan Brinkley et al.); Law and Order: Street Crime, Civil Unrest, and the Crisis of Liberalism in the 1960s (2005); Debating the 1960s: Liberal, Conservative, and Radical Perspectives (2007, co-edited with David Steigerwald); Debating the Reagan Presidency (2009, co-authored with John Ehrman); and In the Heat of the Summer: The New York Riots of 1964 and the War on Crime (2017).
