= Kathleen Wood-Legh =

Canadian historian (1901–1981)

Kathleen Louise Wood-Legh (1901–1981) was a Canadian historian, specialising in medieval social and economic history.

== Life ==
Born in Mount Forest, Ontario, Kathleen Wood-Legh was blind from childhood. After completing a BA in 1923 and an MA in 1924, both at McGill University, she travelled to England with her family for further study. In 1926 she began a PhD at Newnham College under the supervision of G.G. Coulton on church life in medieval England, completed in 1932. Despite glowing references from G.M. Trevelyan, she was unable to secure a permanent academic position and became a tutor and supervisor for undergraduate students at the University of Cambridge.

In 1938 she played a leading role in a number of refugee committees, including the Cambridge Refugee Committee, which helped scholars at threat from the expansion of Nazi Germany, and the Cambridge Children’s Refugee Committee, which found homes for displaced Jewish children. With Anna McClean Bidder, in 1950 she was a founding member of the Society of Women Members of the Regent House who are not Fellows of Colleges, better known as the Dining Group. This informal group of female scholars at Cambridge became the nucleus for Lucy Cavendish College, established in 1965. Wood-Legh wrote the constitution of the new college, becoming a fellow.

She was awarded a Litt.D in 1967. She died in Cambridge in 1981.

== Work ==
Wood-Legh's work on later medieval religious life remains influential to this day. Her key publications include:

- Studies in Church Life in England under Edward III (1934). Based on her PhD thesis.
- Perpetual Chantries in Britain (1965). Based on the series of Birkbeck lectures she delivered in 1955.
- (ed.) Kentish Visitations of Archbishop William Warham and his deputies, 1511-1512 (1984).

== Legacy ==
She is commemorated by the Wood-Legh Room in Lucy Cavendish College, and by the Wood-Legh Prize, awarded by the University of Cambridge Faculty of History for the best dissertation in the MPhil in Medieval History. Her papers are held by Cambridge University Library.
