= Robert Warrand Carlyle =

Administrator in India and writer on medieval subjects

Carlyle in 1918.

Sir Robert Warrand Carlyle KCSI CIE (11 July 1859 – 23 May 1934) was an Indian Civil Servant, and historian on Western medieval period. Beginning as an administrator in India, Carlyle later came to hold the post of Inspector-General of Bengal Police. He later oversaw the construction of the imperial capital of the Raj to Delhi.

== Life and career ==
Robert Warrand was born at Brechin, Angus, Scotland, the elder son of James Edward Carlyle and his wife Jessie Margaret Carlyle. He was related to Thomas Carlyle through his father's side. Robert was educated privately served as chaplain of the Church of Scotland in Bombay, Berlin and Pietermaritzburg. Graduating from Glasgow University, Carlyle joined the Indian Civil Service in 1880. He began his service as assistant magistrate at Midnapore in Bengal and served as under-secretary to Government of Bengal a number of times. In 1894, Carlyle was appointed Magistrate and was transferred to Darbhanga in present-day Bihar. His transfer coincided with the Famine of 1896. Leading the famine relief effort, Carlyle earned the praise of Commissioner of Patna J. A. Bourdillon. He was created CIE in 1898 for his famine work.

In 1902 Carlyle was appointed inspector-general of the Bengal police, and in 1904 he was appointed chief secretary to the Bengal government. In 1907 he was promoted to Revenue and Agriculture Secretary to The Raj. He rose to be the head of the department of Revenue and Agriculture in 1910 with an appointment to the Viceroy's Executive Council. In 1911 he oversaw the planning and construction of the new imperial capital at Delhi for transfer of capital from Calcutta. He was appointed KCSI in 1911. Carlyle retired in 1915 and moved to Essex in England. After his retirement he worked with his younger brother Alexander in publishing histories of medieval political theory in the West. Between 1916 and 1918 Carlyle served in the central tribune. 1919 he was appointed a trustee of the King's Fund. Carlyle died in Florence in May 1934.

== Personal life ==
Carlyle married Isabel Jane Barton in September 1903. Lady Carlyle was awarded the Kaisar-i-Hind gold medal in 1916 for her work in organizing comfort packages for the troops in Mesopotamia. The marriage remained childless. Following his retirement he took an interest in the work of the Church Army through his cousin Prebendary Wilson Carlile.

== Works ==
Carlyle was an advocate of lighter revenue demands. Working in the Revenue and Agriculture department, he presided over an increased investment in agriculture and expanded the fledgling co-operative rural credit movement. He was renowned for his forthcoming views and uncompromising expression of opinion, and was said to have disliked secretariat work and debates at the legislative council.

== Publications ==
- with Carlyle, Alexander James A History of Mediæval Political Theory in the West, 6 vols. (Edinburgh and London: Blackwood 1922).
