= Gerd Buchdahl =

German-English philosopher of science

Gerd Buchdahl (12 August 1914 – 17 May 2001) was a German-English philosopher of science.

== Life ==
Buchdahl was born to German-Jewish parents in Mainz; his younger brother, Hans Adolph Buchdahl was a well-known physicist. Both were transported from Britain to Australia as enemy aliens in 1940 on the Dunera. He became the first lecturer in history and philosophy of science at the University of Cambridge. A founding fellow of Darwin College, he became University Reader in 1966 and was the Tarner Lecturer at Trinity College in 1973, speaking on Science and rational structures.

Buchdahl founded the journal Studies in the History and Philosophy of Science.

He died in Cambridge and was survived by his wife, Nancy, and three sons.

== Works ==
The developing natural sciences were the causal lens through which he viewed and from which he wrote about the consequences on epistemology and the history of metaphysics. His book Metaphysics and the Philosophy of Science. The classical origins: Descartes to Kant (Oxford: Backwell, 1969) detailed interdependencies of philosophy, on one side, and on the other of practical and theoretical natural sciences. It influenced many scholars in their views about (the history of) science and philosophy.

His book Kant and the Dynamics of Reason. Essays on the Structure of Kant's Philosophy (Oxford: Backwell, 1992) shed light upon Kant's critical intellectualism in respect to the then contemporary developments in the sciences, especially for the anglophone world.

== Sources ==
- Buchdahl, Gerd. Article in Werner Röder/Herbert A. Strauss (edit.): International Biographical Dictionary of Central European Émigrés 1933–1945 (Biographisches Handbuch der deutschsprachigen Emigration nach 1933). Vol. 2, K. G. Saur Verlag, Munich 1983.
- Nick Jardine: Obituary. Gerd Buchdahl (1914–2001): Founding Editor. In: Studies in History and Philosophy of Science 32, 2001, No. 3, pp. 401–405.
- Roger S. Woolhouse: Gerd Buchdahl: Biographical and Bibliographical. In: Roger S. Woolhouse (ed.): Metaphysics and Philosophy of Science in the Seventeenth and Eighteenth Centuries. Essays in Honour of Gerd Buchdahl. Kluwer, Dordrecht 1988, ISBN 90-277-2743-0, pp. 1–7.
- Ulrich Charpa, 'The Cambridge 'Real Gymnasium' and the 'Freie Schule' London – Historical and Philosophical Remarks on Gerd Buchdahl and Karl R. Popper' Leo Baeck Institute Year Book 56 (2011): 269–287
