= M. C. Burkitt =

Miles Crawford Burkitt (27 December 1890 – 22 August 1971) was a British archaeologist and prehistorian, who is known for his work, mainly on the Stone Age, in Europe, Asia and especially Africa, where he was one of the first pioneers of African archaeology. He was the first Cambridge University lecturer in Prehistoric Archaeology.

He was educated at Eton College and Trinity College, Cambridge, reading Natural Sciences and having Thomas McKenny Hughes as a professor. He excavated in France and Spain with Abbé Breuil and Hugo Obermaier, and served with the YMCA in France during World War I. He lectured in Cambridge in prehistoric archaeology, at first on a voluntarily basis, and finally as a University Lecturer in the Faculty of Archaeology and Anthropology. During World War II he was a Lieutenant in the 4th Cambridgeshire Home Guard (1941–1945). He was made a J.P. in 1942, and was a County Councillor in Cambridgeshire between 1939 and 1964, ending his term of office as vice-chairman, 1958–1961, and chairman, 1961–1964. He was Sheriff of Cambridgeshire and Huntingdonshire in 1960. He was also an Alderman, 1964–1965.

He was the son of the theologian Francis Crawford Burkitt. His wife was Margaret Isobel Burkitt, née Fry (1900–1978).

== Books ==
His Prehistory: A Study of Early Cultures in Europe and the Mediterranean Basin originally of 1921, was reissued by Cambridge University Press in 2012.

Other books include:

- Our Forerunners (1923), a popularizing work for the Home University Library of Modern Knowledge series.
- Our Early Ancestors: An Introductory Study of Mesolithic, Neolithic and Copper Age Cultures in Europe and Adjacent Regions (1926)
- South Africa's Past in Stone and Paint (1928)
- Henri Breuil, Miles Crawford Burkitt, with the collaboration of Montagu Pollock, Rock paintings of southern Andalusia : a description of a neolithic and copper age art group (PDF) (1929), Oxford, The Clarendon Press.
- The Old Stone Age - A Study of Palaeolithic Times (1933)
