= Frederick William Gamble =

British zoologist (1869–1926)

Frederick William Gamble FRS
- Born: 13 July 1869; Manchester, England
- Died: 14 September 1926 (aged 57); Alvechurch, Worcestershire, England
- Known for: The Animal World
- Scientific career
- Fields: Zoology
- Workplaces: University of Manchester; University of Birmingham

Frederick William Gamble FRS (13 July 1869 – 14 September 1926) was a British zoologist and author.

After secondary education at Manchester Grammar School, Gamble attended the University of Manchester, where he graduated in 1891 B.Sc. and obtained in 1982 the Bishop Berkeley Fellowship. He then studied at Leipzig University. Returning to Manchester, he received in 1893 his M.Sc. At the University of Manchester, he became in 1893 junior lecturer and demonstrator in zoology, in 1895 senior lecturer and demonstrator, and afterwards was promoted to assistant-director of the University Zoological Laboratories. He received his D.Sc. in 1900. He was Secretary of the Manchester Literary and Philosophical Society from 1905 to 1908. In 1909, he was appointed to the chair of zoology at the University of Birmingham and continued in the chair until his death.

Gamble was elected F.R.S. in 1907. He was president of the Zoology Section at the British Association meeting at Toronto in 1924.

== Selected publications ==
- "The power of colour-change in animals". Transactions and Annual Report of the Manchester Microscopical Society. 1899.
- with J. H. Ashworth: The anatomy and classification of the Arenicolidae. 1900.
- Animal Life. 1908.
- The Animal World. Williams and Norgate. 1911; with an introduction by Sir Oliver Lodge. This book is part of the series Home University Library of Modern Knowledge published by Williams and Norgate.
- as editor: A Junior Course of Practical Zoology by A. Milnes Marshall and C. Herbert Hurst (born 1833). Gamble edited the fifth (1899), sixth (1905), and seventh (1912) editions.

Professional and academic associations
Preceded by Charles H. Lees	Secretary of the Manchester Literary and Philosophical Society; 1905–08	Succeeded by C. Gordon Hewitt
