= Tarner Lectures =

The Tarner lectures are a series of public lectures in the philosophy of science given at Trinity College, Cambridge since 1916. Named after Mr Edward Tarner, the lecture addresses 'the Philosophy of the Sciences and the Relations or Want of Relations between the different Departments of Knowledge.' The inaugural lecture was given by Alfred North Whitehead in the autumn of 1919 and are published as his "The concept of nature."

== Past Lectures ==
Full list of Past Tarner Lectures

Year	Speaker	Lecture Title
1919	Dr Alfred North Whitehead	The Concept of Nature
1923	Dr C. D. Broad	The border-line between physics and psychology
1926	Hon. Bertrand Russell	The analysis of matter
1929	Professor G.E. Moore	Knowledge direct and indirect
1931	Revd F. R. Tennant	The relations between the different departments of knowledge
1935	Mr A.D. Ritchie	The natural history of mind
1938	Sir Arthur Eddington	The philosophy of physical science
1941	Dr Cecil Alec Mace	Causality and mind
1946	Professor R. B. Braithwaite	Laws of nature, probability, and scientific explanation
1947	Sir Edmund Whittaker	The concepts of physics
1949	Professor Joseph Henry Woodger	Biology and language
1953	Professor Gilbert Ryle	Cross purposes between theories
1956	Professor Erwin Schrödinger (read by Professor J. Wisdom)	The physical basis of consciousness
1960	Professor Carl Pantin	The A sciences and the B sciences
1962	Mr H.A.C. Dobbs	The concept of time
1965	Professor Hermann Bondi	Assumption and myth in physical theory
1967	Professor Georg Henrik von Wright	Time, Change and Contradiction
1970	Dr Gerd Buchdahl	Science and rational structures
1975	Professor William Kneale	Grammar, logic, and arithmetic
1978	Professor Max Black	Models of rationality
1982	Professor E. O. Wilson	Socio-biology and comparative social theory
1985	Professor Freeman Dyson	Origins of life
1988	Sir Andrew Huxley	Matter, life, evolution
1991	Professor Ian Hacking	Kinds of people and kinds of things
1994	Professor Michael Redhead	From physics to metaphysics
1996	Professor Martin J. S. Rudwick	Constructing geohistory in the age of revolution
2000	Professor Simon Conway Morris	Footsteps to eternity: the implications of evolution
2006	Professor Peter Galison	Images, Objects, and the Scientific Self
2010	Professor Simon Schaffer	When the stars threw down their spears: Histories of Astronomy and Empire
2012	Professor Sir Geoffrey Lloyd	The ideals of inquiry: an ancient history
2019	Professor Elliott Sober	Solving Problems in the Philosophy of Science by using (some simple ideas about) Probability

== See also ==
- Birkbeck Lecture in Ecclesiastical History
- Lees Knowles Lecture

== Bibliography/Further Reading ==
- Whitehead, Alfred North (November 1919). The Concept of Nature – via Project Gutenberg.
- Broad, C. D. (1925). Mind and its place in nature. Harcourt, Brace & Company, Inc. – via Internet Archive.
- Russell, Bertrand (1927). The Analysis Of Matter – via Internet Archive.
- Tennant, Frederick Robert (1932). Philosophy of the sciences : or the relations between the departments of knowledge. University Press. hdl:2027/uc1.$b121150. OCLC 3947993.
- Ritchie, Arthur David (1936). The natural history of mind. Longmans, Green and co. hdl:2027/uc1.b4087816.
- Eddington, Arthur Stanley (1939). The philosophy of physical science. New York. hdl:2027/mdp.39015015937769.
- Farrell, B. A.; Braithwaite, Margaret; Mace, C. A. (1949). "Symposium: Causal Laws in Psychology". Proceedings of the Aristotelian Society, Supplementary Volumes. 23: 31–68. doi:10.1093/aristoteliansupp/23.1.31. ISSN 0309-7013. JSTOR 4106505.
- Braithwaite, Richard Bevan (1953). Scientific Explanation: A Study of the Function of Theory, Probability and Law in Science. CUP Archive. p. 9.
- Whittaker, Edmund Taylor (1979). From Euclid to Eddington: A Study of Conceptions of the External World. CUP Archive.
- Woodger, Joseph Henry (1952). Biology and Language: An Introduction to the Methodology of the Biological Sciences, Including Medicine. University Press.
- Ryle, Gilbert (15 October 2015). Dilemmas: The Tarner Lectures 1953. Cambridge University Press. ISBN 978-1-107-11362-6.
- Schrodinger, Erwin; Penrose, Roger (2012). "The Physical Basis of Consciousness". What is Life?. pp. 93–102. doi:10.1017/CBO9781107295629.012. ISBN 978-1-107-29562-9.
- Pantin, C. F. A. (2010). Relations Between Sciences. Cambridge University Press. ISBN 978-0-521-14815-3.
- Dobbs, H. A. C. (1951). "The Relation Between the Time of Psychology and the Time of Physics Part I". The British Journal for the Philosophy of Science. 2 (6): 122–141. doi:10.1093/bjps/II.6.122.
  - Dobbs, H. A. C. (1951). "The Relation Between the Time of Psychology and the Time of Physics Part II". The British Journal for the Philosophy of Science. 2 (7): 177–192. doi:10.1093/bjps/II.7.177.
- Bondi, Hermann (1967). Assumption and Myth in Physical Theory. Cambridge University Press. ISBN 978-0-521-04282-6.
- Wright, Georg Henrik von (1968). Time, Change and Contradiction: Delivered at Cambridge Univ. 1. Nov. 1968. Cambridge University Press.
- Buchdahl, Gerd (1969). Metaphysics and the Philosophy of Science: The Classical Origins: Descartes to Kant. MIT Press. ISBN 978-0-631-11720-9.
- Kneale, William Calvert; Kneale, Martha (1962). The Development of Logic. Clarendon Press. ISBN 978-0-19-824773-9.
- Black, Max (1975). Caveats and Critiques: Philosophical Essays in Language, Logic, and Art. Cornell University Press. ISBN 978-0-8014-0958-5.
- Wilson, Edward O. (1999). Consilience: The Unity of Knowledge. Vintage Books. ISBN 978-0-679-76867-8.
- Dyson, Freeman (1999). Origins of Life. Cambridge University Press. ISBN 978-1-139-42576-6.
- Huxley, Andrew (1985). "How Far Will Darwin Take Us?". In Bendall, D. S. (ed.). Evolution From Molecules to Men. CUP Archive. pp. 3–19. ISBN 978-0-521-28933-7.
- Hacking, Ian (2006). "Making Up People". London Review of Books. 28 (16): 23–26. ISSN 0260-9592.
- Redhead, Michael (1995). From Physics to Metaphysics. Cambridge: Cambridge University Press. doi:10.1017/cbo9780511622847. ISBN 978-0-511-62284-7.
- Rudwick, Martin J. S. (2005). Bursting the Limits of Time: The Reconstruction of Geohistory in the Age of Revolution. University of Chicago Press. ISBN 978-0-226-73111-7.
- Morris, Simon Conway (2003). Life's Solution: Inevitable Humans in a Lonely Universe. Cambridge University Press. ISBN 978-1-139-44080-6.
- Daston, Lorraine; Galison, Peter (2007). Objectivity. Zone Books. ISBN 978-1-890951-78-8.
- Schaffer, Simon. "Video & Audio: Tarner Lectures (2010)". sms.cam.ac.uk.
- Lloyd, Geoffrey. "Video & Audio: Trinity College Tarner Lectures (2012)". sms.cam.ac.uk.
- Sober, Elliott. "Video & Audio: Tarner Lecture Series 2019". sms.cam.ac.uk.
