= John M. Mogey =

British geographer and sociologist

John MacFarlane Mogey (born 7 July 1915) was a British geographer and sociologist whose career was based on his study of conditions in Northern Ireland.

== Career ==
In 1939, Mogey broadcast with Emyr Estyn Evans on "Who Are The Irish?" for the BBC Northern Ireland service. He also gave radio talks in 1946 and 1947.

From 1941, he was the rural survey officer for the Northern Ireland Council of Social Service for whom he produced his survey of Rural Life in Northern Ireland (1947). He received his D.Sc. from Queen's University of Belfast in 1948 for a dissertation based on that work. In the same year he was elected a fellow of the Royal Geographical Society (1948).

He was lecturer in Sociology at the University of Oxford and wrote several articles on Northern Ireland geography for the 1950 edition of Chambers's Encyclopaedia where he was credited as "M.C.C.".

In 1959, Mogey and family moved to the United States where he continued his academic career.

== Personal life ==
Mogey married Doreen (born 5 December 1913) and they had 2 sons, Martin and James, and a daughter Honour .

== Selected publications ==
- Rural Life in Northern Ireland: Five regional studies made for the Northern Ireland Council of Social Service (Inc.), Oxford University Press, London, 1947.
- "The community in Northern Ireland", Man, Vol. 48 (1948), S. 85–87.
- The Study of Geography, Oxford University Press, London, 1950. (Home University Library of Modern Knowledge, No. 214)
- "Primitive transport vehicles in Ulster", Man, Vol. 51 (1951), S. 3–5. (With George Barton Thompson)
- Family and Neighbourhood. Two studies in Oxford, Oxford University Press, London, 1956.
- The Sociology of Housing. Studies at Berinsfield, Routledge & Kegan Paul, London, 1965. (With Raymond Neville Morris)
- "Sociology of marriage and family behaviour 1957-1968; a trend report and bibliography", Current Sociology, Vol. 17, No. 1-3, 1969.
- Social change in urban America, Harper and Row, New York & London, 1973. (Edited with Max Birnbaum) ISBN 0060407018
