= Wilkinson Bird =

British Army general (1869–1943)

Major-General Sir Wilkinson Bird KBE CB CMG DSO
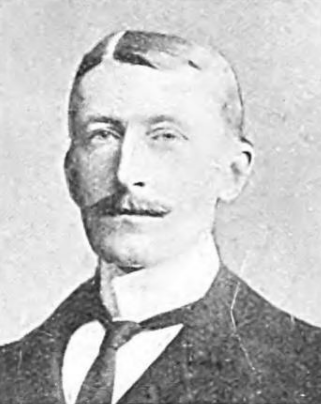
- Born: 4 May 1869
- Died: 6 January 1943 (aged 73)
- Military career
- Allegiance: United Kingdom
- Branch: British Army
- Service years: 1888–1923
- Rank: Major-General
- Units: Queen's Royal Regiment; Royal Irish Rifles
- Commands: 7th Brigade; 2nd Battalion, Royal Irish Rifles
- Conflicts: Second Boer War; First World War
- Awards: Knight Commander of the Order of the British Empire; Companion of the Order of the Bath; Companion of the Order of St Michael and St George; Distinguished Service Order; Mentioned in Despatches

Major-General Sir Wilkinson Dent Bird, KBE, CB, CMG, DSO (4 May 1869 – 6 January 1943) was an officer of the British Army during the late-19th century and the First World War.

== Early life and military career ==
Dent was born on 4 May 1869, the son of J.D. Bird, a captain in the 20th Hussars. After studying at Wellington and the Royal Military College, Sandhurst, he took a commission as a second lieutenant in the Queen's Royal Regiment (West Surrey) on 22 August 1888.

He was promoted to lieutenant on 1 December 1890, and to captain on 21 April 1897. That year, he served with the Niger Expedition, where he was mentioned in despatches and received a brevet promotion to major on 6 June 1897. His next posting took him to the North-Western Frontier of India.

Bird served with his regiment in the Second Boer War, where he was present at the Relief of Mafeking and was again mentioned in despatches, but was severely wounded and returned home in 1900. For his service, he was awarded the Distinguished Service Order (DSO).

Bird was back as a regular captain in his regiment in July 1902. From 1903 to 1905 he was chief instructor at the School of Musketry, and from 24 June 1905 to 1909 a lecturer at the Staff College, India. He was promoted to a brevet lieutenant-colonelcy in December 1909, and appointed a General Staff Officer, Grade 2, at the War Office the following year.

In September 1913 Bird, promoted in September 1910 to major, was transferred from the Queen's to the Royal Irish Rifles (later the Royal Ulster Rifles) and promoted to lieutenant colonel.

== First World War ==
He was in command of the battalion at the outbreak of the First World War in 1914, when it was sent to France with the 7th Brigade, 3rd Division. On 26 August, at the Battle of Le Cateau, he assumed command of the 7th Brigade when its commander, Brigadier General Frederick McCracken, was disabled by an artillery shell.

Bird was severely wounded at the First Battle of the Aisne, on 15 September; his leg had to be amputated as a result, and on recovery he returned to the general staff rather than regimental service. He was promoted to brevet colonel in February 1915 and appointed a personal aide-de-camp to King George V. He was made a general staff officer, grade 1 in 1915, and appointed director of staff duties at the War Office in February 1916, taking over from Major General Colin Mackenzie. In June 1916 he was made a CB in the 1916 Birthday Honours.

In May 1918, after being promoted to temporary major general, he took up the post of lieutenant governor of the Royal Hospital, Chelsea.

== Post-war years ==
He retired from the army in 1923, having received a promotion to major general on 16 August 1921. He was appointed the Lees Knowles Lecturer at Trinity College, Cambridge for the year 1927.

From December 1929 to 1939, Bird served as the colonel of the Queen's Royal Regiment (West Surrey), taking over from General Sir Charles Monro.

== Family ==
Bird married Winifred Barker in early 1902; the couple had two daughters. The eldest daughter was born in Westminster on 1 January 1903.

== Notes ==
Military offices
Preceded by Sir Charles Monro	Colonel of the 2nd (The Queen's Royal) Regiment of Foot; 1929–1939	Succeeded by Sir Ivo Vesey
