= Lees Knowles Lecture =

Lecture series at Trinity College, Cambridge

The Lees Knowles Lectureship was established at Trinity College, Cambridge in 1912 and first started in 1915. Lectures are given by distinguished experts in military and naval history and selection for this lectureship is considered one of the highest honours available to specialists in military history and affairs. The lectureship was established by a bequest by Trinity alumnus and military historian Sir Lees Knowles.

List of Lecturers and Lectures
Year	Lecturers	Lectures
1915	Sir Julian Corbett	The Great War after Trafalgar
1922	Col. Maxwell Earle	The principal strategical problems affecting the British Empire
1923	Col. Maxwell Earle	The principles of war
1924	Col. M.A. Wingfield	The eight principles of war as exemplified in the Palestine campaign, 1915–1918
1924	Lt.-Col. F. Nosworthy	Russia before, during and after the Great War
1925	Major-Gen. Sir Frederick Maurice	Statesmen and soldiers in the American civil war
1927	Major-Gen. Sir Wilkinson Bird	Some early crises of the war, and the events leading up to them: Western Front 1914
1928	Major Gen. Sir George Aston	Problems of empire defence
1929	A.R. Hinks	Frontiers and boundary delimitations
1930	W.W. Tarn	Hellenistic military developments
1931	Adm. Sir Herbert Richmond	Capture at sea in war
1932	Capt. Basil Liddell Hart	The movement of military thought from the eighteenth to the twentieth century, and its influence on European history
1933	John Buchan (Lord Tweedsmuir)	Oliver Cromwell as a soldier
1934	Air Com. L E O Charlton	Military aeronautics applied to modern warfare
1936	C.R.M.F. Cruttwell	The role of British strategy in the Great War
1937	Gen. Sir Edmund Ironside	British military history from 1899 to the present
1939	Gen. Sir Archibald Wavell	Generalship
1940	Gen. Sir Frederick Maurice	Public opinion in war
1941	Capt. Cyril Falls	The nature of modern warfare
1942	Maj. Gen. Sir George Lindsay	War on the civil and military fronts
1943	Admiral of the Fleet. The Lord Keyes	Amphibious Warfare and Combined Operations
1946	Col. A.H. Burne	Military strategy as exemplified in World War II
1947	Air-Marshal Sir Arthur Tedder	Air power in modern warfare
1948	Adml. Sir William James	The influence of sea power upon the history of the British people
1949	Sir Ronald Weeks	Organisation and equipment for war
1950	Sir Henry Tizard	The influence of war on science
1951	Gen. Sir William Platt	The campaign against Italian East Africa, 1940–1
1951	Capt. G.H. Roberts, RN,	The battles of the Atlantic
1952	Air Chief Marshal Sir Roderic Hill	Some human factors in war
1953	Sir Fitzroy Maclean	Irregular warfare
1954	Gen. Sir Brian Horrocks	Are we training for the last war?
1956	Prof. P.M.S. Blackett	Atomic weapons, 1945–1955
1957	John Ehrman	Cabinet government and war, 1890–1940
1958	Field Marshal John Harding, 1st Baron Harding of Petherton	Mediterranean strategy in the 2nd World War
1958	Sir Leslie Rowan	Arms and economics: the changing challenge
1960	Capt. Stephen Roskill	Maritime strategy in the twentieth century
1961	Field Marshal William Slim, 1st Viscount Slim	The military mind and the spirit of an army
1962	Lt. Gen. Sir John Hackett	The profession of arms
1963	Dr. Noble Frankland	The strategic air offensive
1965	Sir Solly Zuckerman	Science and military affairs
1966	Prof Michael Howard	Conduct of British strategy in the 2nd World War
1968	Prof. R.V. Jones	Command
1969	Alastair Buchan	The changing functions of military force in international politics
1970	Prof. Geoffrey Best	Conscience and the conduct of war, from the French Revolution through the Franco-Prussian war
1971	Prof. F. Harry Hinsley	War and the development of the international system
1972	Prof. John Erickson	Soviet soldiers and Soviet society
1973	Dr. Piers Mackesy	Problems of an amphibious power 1795–1808
1974	Donald Cameron Watt	European armed forces and the approach of the 2nd World War 1933–39
1974	Prof. Herman Bondi	Science and defence
1975	Dr. R.L. Clutterbuck	Guerilla warfare and political violence
1977	Prof. Christopher Thorne	Anglo-American relations and war against Japan 1941–45
1979	Field-Marshal Lord Carver	Apostles of mobility
1981	Prof. Laurence W. Martin	Evolution of nuclear strategic doctrine since 1945
1983	Alistair Horne	The French army and politics 1870–1970
1985	Dr. Geoffrey Parker	European warfare 1520–1660
1986	John Keegan	Some fallacies of military history
1989	Dr. Alan Bowman	Vindolanda and the Roman Army: New documents from the northern frontier
1990	Maurice Keen	English military experience, c.1340 – c.1450
1992	Prof. William Hardy McNeill	Dance, drill and bonding in human affairs
1995	Prof. Hew Strachan	The politics of the British Army 1815–1914
1996	Field-Marshal Sir Peter Inge	Military force in a changing world
1998	Prof. Keith Jeffery	‘For the freedom of small nations’: Ireland and the Great War
2000	Prof. Brian Bond	Britain and the First World War: The challenge to historians
2002	Antony Beevor	The experience of war
2004	Dr. David Parrott	War, Armies, and Politics in Early Modern Europe: The Military Devolution, 1560–1660
2006	Ben Shephard	What Makes a Soldier? And What Does Not?
2008	Peter Paret	1806: The Cognitive Challenge of War
2010	Andrew Roberts; Prof. Nicholas Rodger; Prof. Richard Overy; Sir Max Hastings	The creation of Anglo-American grand strategy 1941–45; The British Navy in the Second World War; Air Power in the Second World War: A War Winner? The British Army in the Second World War
2012	Prof. Amir Weiner	Total War: The Soviet Union and the Eastern Front in a Comparative Framework
2013		
2014	Sir Sherard Cowper-Coles	Folly in foreign policy: On the British misadventure in Afghanistan
2015		
2016	Dr. James Howard-Johnston	The Byzantine Art of War
2018	Dr. Nicholas Rodger	The Culture of Naval War, ca 1850 – 1950
2020	Gen. David Petreaus	
2022	Prof. Jay Winter	The Civilianization of War

== See also ==
- Birkbeck Lecture in Ecclesiastical History
- Tarner Lectures
