= Tetsurō Watsuji =

Japanese historian and philosopher (1889–1960)

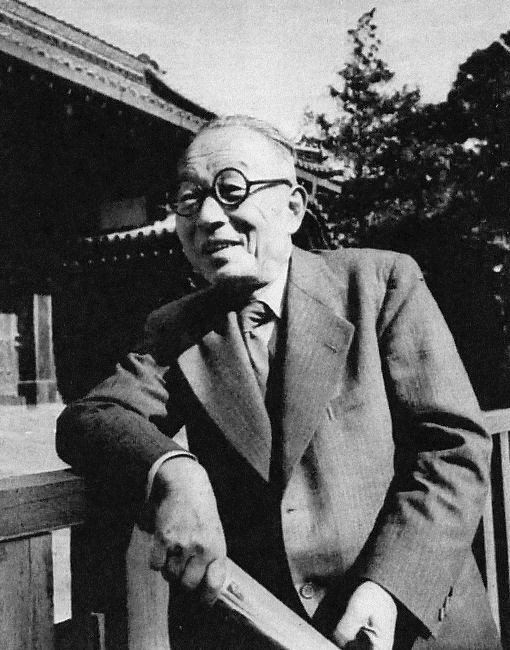
- Born: March 1, 1889; Himeji, Hyōgo Prefecture, Japan
- Died: December 26, 1960 (aged 71); Tokyo, Japan

Education
- Education: Imperial University of Tokyo

Philosophical work
- Era: 20th-century philosophy
- Region: Japanese philosophy
- School: Continental; Kyoto School
- Institutions: Toyo University; Hosei University; Imperial University of Kyoto; Ryukoku University; Otani University
- Main interests: Aesthetics, ethics, culture, religion
- Notable ideas: Being and Space (not just Time); Ethics as Philosophical Anthropology

Tetsurō Watsuji (和辻 哲郎, Watsuji Tetsurō; March 1, 1889 – December 26, 1960) was a Japanese historian and moral philosopher.

== Early life ==
Watsuji was born in Himeji, Hyōgo Prefecture to a physician. During his youth he enjoyed poetry and had a passion for Western literature. For a short time he was the coeditor of a literary magazine and was involved in writing poems and plays. His interests in philosophy came to light while he was a student at First Higher School in Tokyo, although his interest in literature would always remain strong throughout his life.

In his early writings (between 1913 and 1915) he introduced the work of Søren Kierkegaard to Japan, as well as working on Friedrich Nietzsche, but in 1918 he turned against this earlier position, criticizing Western philosophical individualism, and attacking its influence on Japanese thought and life. This led to a study of the roots of Japanese culture, including Japanese Buddhist art, and notably the work of the medieval Zen Buddhist Dōgen. Watsuji was also interested in the famous Japanese writer Natsume Sōseki, whose books were influential during Watsuji's early years.

== Career ==
In the early 1920s Watsuji taught at Toyo, Hosei and Keio universities, and at Tsuda Eigaku-juku (now, Tsuda University).

The issues of hermeneutics attracted his attention, especially the hermeneutics of Boeckh and Dilthey.

In March 1925, Watsuji became a lecturer at Kyoto Imperial University, joining the other leading philosophers of the time, Nishida Kitarō, Tanabe Hajime and Nishitani Keiji. These three philosophers were members of the Kyoto School. While Watsuji joined their department, he is not typically considered a member of the School owing to the intellectual independence in his work. In July, he was promoted to associate professor of ethics.

In January 1927, it was decided that he would go to Germany for 3 years for his research on the history of moral thought. He departed on 17 February and finally arrived in Berlin in early April. At the beginning of summer, he read Heidegger's newly published Being and Time. He then went to Paris. He left Paris in early December and arrived in Genoa on the 12th of that month.

From January to March 1928, Watsuji travelled to Rome, Naples, Sicily, Florence, Bologna, Ravenna, Padua, and Venice. He then cut his trip short and returned to Japan in early July. His stay in Europe only lasted for roughly a year.

In March 1931, Watsuji was promoted to full professor at Kyoto Imperial University. He then moved to the Tokyo Imperial University in July 1934 and held the chair in ethics until his retirement in March 1949.

During World War II his theories (which claimed the superiority of Japanese approaches to and understanding of human nature and ethics, and which argued for the negation of self) provided support for Japanese nationalism, a fact which, after the war, he said that he regretted.

Watsuji died at the age of 71.

== Work ==
Watsuji's three main works were his two-volume 1954 History of Japanese Ethical Thought, his three-volume Ethics, first published in 1937, 1942, and 1949, and his 1935 Climate. The last of these develops his most distinctive thought. In it, Watsuji argues for an essential relationship between climate and other environmental factors and the nature of human cultures, and he distinguished three types of culture: pastoral, desert, and monsoon.

In the iconoclastic and xenophilic cultural atmosphere after the Surrender of Japan, Watsuji depicted Hirata Atsutane extremely negatively, calling him a "fanatic" and a "deviant".

Watsuji wrote that Kendo involves raising a struggle to a life-transcending level by freeing oneself from an attachment to life.

== List of works ==
Collected Works [和辻哲郎全集], 27 vols. (Iwanami Shoten [岩波書店], 1961–91) [CW].

CW1

- Studies on Nietzsche [ニイチェ研究] (Uchida Rôkakuho [内田老鶴圃], 1913), reprinted in CW1:1-391.
- Søren Kierkegaard [ゼエレン・キェルケゴオル] (Uchida Rôkakuho [内田老鶴圃], 1915), reprinted in CW1:393-679.

CW2

- Pilgrimages to the Ancient Temples [古寺巡礼] (Iwanami Shoten [岩波書店], 1919), reprinted in CW2:1-192.
- Katsura Imperial Villa: Investigating the Background Behind Its Style [桂離宮——様式の背後を探る] (Chûô Kôronsha [中央公論社], 1958), reprinted in CW2:192-386.

Originally published as Katsura Imperial Villa: Reflections on Its Construction Process [桂離宮——製作過程の考察] (Chûô Kôronsha [中央公論社], 1955), it was significantly rewritten after receiving criticism from the architectural historian Ôta Hirotarô.

- ‘Eyes of the Haniwa Statue’ [人物埴輪の眼] (Sekai [世界], January 1956), reprinted in CW2:387-392.
- ‘What the Maijishan Grottoes Tell Us’ [麦積山塑像の示唆するもの] (Preface to Natori Yōnosuke, Bakusekizan Sekkutsu [麦積山石窟], Iwanami Shoten [岩波書店], 1957), reprinted in CW2:392-400.

CW3

- Ancient Japanese Culture [日本古代文化] (Iwanami Shoten [岩波書店], 1920), reprinted in CW3:1-305.
- The Hidden Japan [埋もれた日本] (Shinchôsha [新潮社], 1951), reprinted in CW3:307-507.

CW4

- Studies on Japanese Intellectual History, Vol. 1 [日本精神史研究] (Iwanami Shoten [岩波書店], 1926), reprinted in CW4:1-271.
- Studies on Japanese Intellectual History, Vol. 2 [続日本精神史研究] (Iwanami Shoten [岩波書店], 1935), reprinted in CW4:273-551.

CW5

- The Practical Philosophy of Early Buddhism [原始仏教の実践哲学] (Iwanami Shoten [岩波書店], 1927), reprinted in CW5:1-293.
- The Beginnings of Buddhist Philosophy [仏教哲学の最初の展開] (Kokoro [心], June 1955–May 1958), reprinted in CW5:295-568.
- ‘Reply to Kimura Taiken’s Criticisms’ [木村泰賢氏の批評に答う] (Shisō [思想], April 1927), reprinted in CW5:569-580.

CW6

- Professor Koeber [ケーベル先生] (Kôbundô [弘文堂], 1948), reprinted in CW6:1-39.
- Critique of Homer [ホメーロス批判] (Kaname Shobô [要書房], 1946), reprinted in CW6:41-255.
- Confucius [孔子] (Iwanami Shoten [岩波書店], 1938), reprinted in CW6:257-355.
- Forerunners of the Modern Philosophy of History: Vico and Herder [近代歴史哲学の先駆者——ヴィコとヘルダー] (Kôbundô [弘文堂], 1950), reprinted in CW6:357-421.

On Vico among others.

CW7

- The Cultural Significance of Early Christianity [原始キリスト教の文化的意義] (Iwanami Shoten [岩波書店], 1926), reprinted in CW7:1-150.
- Ethics of Humanity in the Polis [ポリス的人間の倫理学] (Hakujitsu Shoin [白日書院], 1948), reprinted in CW7:151-350.

CW8

- Climate: Philosophico-Anthropological Reflections [風土——人間学的考察] (Iwanami Shoten [岩波書店], 1935), reprinted in CW8:1-256.
- Pilgrimages to the Ancient Temples of Italy [イタリア古寺巡礼] (Kaname Shobô [要書房], 1950), reprinted in CW8:257-408.

CW9

- Ethics as the Study of Humanity [人間の学としての倫理学] (Iwanami Shoten [岩波書店], 1934), reprinted in CW9:1-192.
- Kant’s Critique of Practical Reason [カント実践理性批判] (Iwanami Shoten [岩波書店], 1935), reprinted in CW9:193-315.
- Personality and Human Nature [人格と人類性] (Iwanami Shoten [岩波書店], 1938), reprinted in CW9:317-479.

CW10

- Ethics, Vol. 1 [倫理学(上)] (Iwanami Shoten [岩波書店], 1937–42), reprinted in CW10:1-659.

CW11

- Ethics, Vol. 2 [倫理学(下)] (Iwanami Shoten [岩波書店], 1949), reprinted in CW11:1-448.

CW12

- A History of Japanese Ethical Thought, Vol. 1 [日本倫理思想史(上)] (Tokyo: Iwanami Shoten [岩波書店], 1952), reprinted in CW12:1-514.

CW13

- A History of Japanese Ethical Thought, Vol. 2 [日本倫理思想史(下)] (Tokyo: Iwanami Shoten [岩波書店], 1952), reprinted in CW13:1-496.

CW14

- Royalist Thought and Its Tradition [尊皇思想とその伝統] (Iwanami Shoten [岩波書店], 1943), reprinted in CW14:1-294.
- The Way of the Imperial Subject in Japan [日本の臣道] (Chikuma Shobô [筑摩書房], 1944), reprinted in CW14:295-312.

Published together with The National Character of the United States [アメリカの国民性]. The book was ordered banned from sale by SCAP during the US Occupation.

- The Symbol of National Unification [国民統合の象徴] (Keisô Shobô [勁草書房], 1948), reprinted in CW14:313-396.

CW15

- Sakoku: Japan’s Tragedy [鎖国——日本の悲劇] (Chikuma Shobô [筑摩書房], 1950), reprinted in CW15:1-562.

CW16

- Studies on the History of Japanese Art: Kabuki and Jōruri [日本芸術史研究——歌舞伎と操り浄瑠璃] (Iwanami Shoten [岩波書店], 1955), reprinted in CW16:1-716.

CW17

- The Revival of the Idol [偶像再興] (Iwanami Shoten [岩波書店], 1918), reprinted in CW17:1-284.
- Mask and Persona [面とペルソナ] (Iwanami Shoten [岩波書店], 1937), reprinted in CW17:285-450.
- The National Character of the United States [アメリカの国民性] (Chikuma Shobô [筑摩書房], 1944), reprinted in CW17:451-481.

Published together with The Way of the Imperial Subject in Japan [日本の臣道].

CW18

- An Attempt at Autobiography [自叙伝の試み] (Chûô Kôronsha [中央公論社], 1961), reprinted in CW18:1-458.

Unfinished work, posthumous publication.

CW19

- A History of Buddhist Ethical Thought [仏教倫理思想史]

Previously unpublished work.

CW20-24

- Essays

CW25

- Letters

CW26

- Lecture Notes

CW27

- Notes and Miscellanea

=== English translations ===
- 1961: Climate and Culture: A Philosophical Study trans. from Fūdo (風土) by Geoffrey Bownas (Westport, CT: Greenwood Press)
- 1969: Japanese Ethical Thought in the Noh Plays of the Muromachi Period trans. from chapter 4 of Nihon Rinri Shisōshi (日本倫理思想史) by David A. Dilworth (Monumenta Nipponica 24:4, 467-498)
- 1971: The Significance of Ethics As the Study of Man trans. from the introduction to Rinrigaku (倫理学) vol. 1 by David A. Dilworth (Monumenta Nipponica 26:3/4, 395-413)
- 1996: Watsuji Tetsurō's Rinrigaku: Ethics in Japan trans. from the first half of Rinrigaku (倫理学) vol. 1 by Seisaku Yamamoto & Robert Carter (Albany: State University of New York Press)
- 1998: Various essays in Sourcebook for Modern Japanese Philosophy by David Dilworth and Valdo Viglielmo with Agustin Jacinto Zavala.
- 2009: Mask and Persona trans. from Men to Perusona (面とペルソナ) by Carl M. Johnson
- 2009: The Psychology of Idol Worship trans. from Gūzō Sūhai no Shinri (偶像崇拝の心理) by Carl M. Johnson
- 2011: Purifying Zen: Watsuji Tetsurō's Shamon Dōgen trans. from Shamon Dōgen (沙門道元) by Steve Bein (Honolulu: University of Hawaii Press)
- 2011: Pilgrimages to the Ancient Temples in Nara trans. from Koji Junrei (古寺巡礼) by Hiroshi Nara (Portland, ME: MerwinAsia)
- 2021: “Professor Koeber” trans. K.M.J. Shuttleworth and Sayaka Shuttleworth. Journal of East Asian Philosophy 1: 75–99.
- 2021: “Middle School” from Attempt at an Autobiography trans. K.M.J. Shuttleworth and Sayaka Shuttleworth. European Journal of Japanese Philosophy 6: 267–322.
- 2021: “America’s National Character” trans. K.M.J. Shuttleworth and Sayaka Shuttleworth. Philosophy East and West 71 (4):1005-1028.
- 2023: "A Consideration of National Character" trans. K.M.J. Shuttleworth. Journal East Asian Philosophy 2. 199-215.
- 2024: "Watsuji Tetsurō’s Memory of Natsume Sōseki: A Translation of 'Until I met Sōseki' and 'Sōseki’s Character'" trans K.M.J. Shuttleworth. Journal of East Asian Philosophy.
- 2026: "Climate" in The Collected Philosophical Essays of Watsuji: Climate, Ethics, Nationality. Edited and translated by Kyle Michael James Shuttleworth and Takeshi Morisato. Edinburgh University Press.
- 2026: "Historical Reflections on the Study of Climate" in The Collected Philosophical Essays of Watsuji: Climate, Ethics, Nationality. Edited and translated by Kyle Michael James Shuttleworth and Takeshi Morisato. Edinburgh University Press.
- 2026: "Various Aspects of Virtue" in The Collected Philosophical Essays of Watsuji: Climate, Ethics, Nationality. Edited and translated by Kyle Michael James Shuttleworth and Takeshi Morisato. Edinburgh University Press.
- 2026: "The History of Ethical Thought in Japan: An Introduction" in The Collected Philosophical Essays of Watsuji: Climate, Ethics, Nationality. Edited and translated by Kyle Michael James Shuttleworth and Takeshi Morisato. Edinburgh University Press.
- 2027: Attempt at an Autobiography. Translated by Kyle Michael James Shuttleworth and Sayaka Shuttleworth. University of Hawai'i Press.

== See also ==
- Kuki Shūzō
