= H. M. Margoliouth =

British poet and scholar

Herschel Maurice Margoliouth (22 February 1887 – 20 March 1959) was a British poet and literary scholar who was a professor of English at University College of Southampton (1921–25) and later secretary of faculties at Oxford University (1925–47). He was a fellow of Oriel College from 1935.

== Selected publications ==
- The Poems and Letters of Andrew Marvell.
- Intimation and Other Poems, Oxford University Press, Oxford, 1948.
- William Blake. 1951. (Home University Library of Modern Knowledge)
- Wordsworth and Coleridge 1795-1831, Oxford University Press, 1953. (Home University Library of Modern Knowledge No. 223)
- William Blake's Vala: Blake's Numbered Text, Oxford University Press, 1956.
