= Frederick McCracken =

British Army general (1859–1949)

Lieutenant-General Sir Frederick McCracken KCB DSO
- Born: 18 August 1859; Kent, England
- Died: 8 August 1949 (aged 89)
- Military career
- Allegiance: United Kingdom
- Branch: British Army
- Service years: 1879–1922
- Rank: Lieutenant-General
- Unit: Royal Berkshire Regiment
- Commands: 2nd Battalion, Royal Berkshire Regiment; 7th Infantry Brigade; 15th (Scottish) Division; XIII Corps; Scottish Command
- Awards: Knight Commander of the Order of the Bath; Distinguished Service Order

Lieutenant-General Sir Frederick William Nicholas McCracken, KCB, DSO (18 August 1859 – 8 August 1949) was a British Army officer who saw regimental service in Africa during the late nineteenth century, and later held senior command during the First World War. He commanded an infantry brigade in the British Expeditionary Force (BEF) of 1914, was appointed to command 15th (Scottish) Division in the New Armies from 1915 to 1917, and then briefly commanded XIII Corps on the Western Front before being posted to a home command in the United Kingdom.

== Early life and military career ==
Born on 18 August 1859, the youngest son of R. de Crez McCracken of Kent, he studied at Royal Military College, Sandhurst and then took a commission as a subaltern, with the rank of second lieutenant, into the 49th Regiment of Foot, which later became the Royal Berkshire Regiment, on 13 August 1879.

He was promoted to lieutenant the following year on 28 July 1880, and served in the Anglo-Egyptian War of 1882 with his regiment, which had since become the 1st Battalion of the Royal Berkshire Regiment.

After Egypt he was appointed the battalion adjutant on 21 March 1883, and promoted to captain, dated 15 December 1884. He saw service during the Mahdist War in 1885, at Tofrek, where he was mentioned in dispatches and given a brevet promotion to major, dated from 14 August 1885, "in recognition of his services in the recent operations in the Sudan". Serving on the Egyptian frontier later in the year, he saw action at the Battle of Ginnis. He attended the Staff College, Camberley, gaining his psc, from 1887 to 1888.

He married Ann Liston Glover in 1887; the couple had a son and two daughters before Ann's death in 1923.

In April 1892 he was seconded to the staff and appointed deputy assistant adjutant general in Barbados. He received a full promotion to major, dated 27 March 1897, and when his term on the staff expired in April that year he returned to the Royal Berkshires.

At the outbreak of the Second Boer War in October 1899, he fought in South Africa with the 1st Berkshires throughout 1900, and in 1901 took command of the 2nd Berkshires. In 1902 he commanded a garrison force of several battalions. For his services in the war, he was again mentioned in despatches and given a brevet promotion to lieutenant colonel, with effect from 29 November 1900. He was awarded the Distinguished Service Order (DSO), as well as the Queen's medal with three clasps, and the King's medal with two.

After the end of the war in June 1902, McCracken and the rest of the 2nd Battalion was sent to Egypt, where they arrived on the SS Dominion in November 1902.

"Until after dark Brigadier-General McCracken maintained his stand under severe gun and rifle fire, and did not retire until the rear of the column was in safety. He then withdrew skilfully and with comparatively few casualties. I consider that his ready and daring handling of the rear-guard averted a mishap which might have been a disaster. I am glad to be able to bring his action to your notice, as I think it deserves recognition."

— Major-General Edmund Allenby writing to General Sir Horace Smith-Dorrien, 1 November 1914.

After the Boer War, McCracken received a full promotion to lieutenant colonel in April 1903, then a brevet promotion to colonel in February 1905. He commanded a battalion of his regiment until 1907, when he was placed on half-pay. He was promoted to colonel in July that year and on 2 December became an assistant adjutant general (AAG) in India.

He was also made a Companion of the Order of the Bath in June 1910. He held staff postings in India until March 1911 when he vacated his appointment and went on half-pay. This only lasted until April, when he was made a temporary brigadier general on the staff at Irish Command. In October 1912 he succeeded Laurence Drummond in command of the 7th Infantry Brigade, part of the 3rd Division under Major General Sir Henry Rawlinson (later a full general and corps and army commander on the Western Front), and was again promoted to temporary brigadier general.

== First World War ==
He commanded the 7th Brigade when it was sent to France in August 1914 as part of the British Expeditionary Force (BEF). At the Battle of Le Cateau later in the month, McCracken was briefly disabled by an artillery shell on the 26th and was relieved by Colonel W. D. Bird, one of his battalion commanders. The 7th Brigade covered the retreat of II Corps, and after a personal recommendation to the corps commander by Major-General Edmund Allenby, who was commanding the 1st Cavalry Division, McCracken was promoted to major general, "for distinguished service in the field", dated back to 26 October, and appointed inspector of infantry on 2 December.

In March 1915 he took command of the 15th (Scottish) Division, a Kitchener's Army formation, and led it on the Western Front, through the Battle of Loos in the autumn of that year, the Battle of the Somme in 1916, and the Battle of Arras in April 1917. Whilst he had been praised for his resilience in command of the 7th Brigade, reports on his command of the 15th Division were less favourable, with one observer describing him as "weak and lazy". These failings did not stop him being promoted to temporary lieutenant general to command XIII Corps in June 1917. He remained with the corps until March 1918, when he was sacked and sent home to take over Scottish Command from Lieutenant General Sir Spencer Ewart and managed to retain his temporary lieutenant general's rank.

During the war, he was mentioned in despatches a further seven times, and made a Knight Commander of the Order of the Bath in June 1917.

== Post-war and final years ==
He retired from the army in 1922, and died in August 1949, a few days before his ninetieth birthday.

== Notes ==
Military offices
Preceded by Colin MacKenzie	GOC 15th (Scottish) Division; 1915–1917	Succeeded by Hamilton Reed
Preceded by Sir Walter Congreve	GOC XIII Corps; 1917–1918	Succeeded by Sir Beauvoir de Lisle
Preceded by Sir Spencer Ewart	GOC-in-C Scottish Command; 1918–1919	Succeeded by Sir Francis Davies
