= Alexander James Carlyle =

British historian and clergyman

Alexander James Carlyle

Alexander James Carlyle, FBA (24 July 1861 – 27 May 1943) was a British historian, social reformer and clergyman.

Born in Bombay, his father was a Church of Scotland minister. Educated at the University of Glasgow and Exeter College, Oxford (graduating from the latter in 1888), he was a curate before being a fellow of University College, Oxford (1893–95) and then rector of St Martin and All Saints' Church, Oxford (1895–1919). A liberal and a Christian socialist, he advocated social reform and trade unionism; he also published books on the history of Christianity and political history. With his brother Sir Robert Carlyle, he wrote the six-volume History of Medieval Political Theory in the West (1903–36), to which he was the major contributor in five of the volumes. In the meantime, he taught in Oxford colleges and also served as a canon of Worcester (1930–34).

Carlyle was the Olaus Petri Lecturer at Uppsala University in 1918, the Lowell Lecturer at the Lowell Institute in 1924, and the Birkbeck Lecturer in Ecclesiastical History at Trinity College, Cambridge, between 1925 and 1927. He was elected a fellow of the British Academy in 1934 and received an honorary doctorate from the University of Glasgow. He died on 27 May 1943. His wife, Rebecca Monteith Smith, daughter of Walter Chalmers Smith, had died two years earlier. The Carlyle Lectures in political history are held in his memory at the University of Oxford.
