= Christopher Norris =

Christopher Norris may refer to:

- Christopher Norris (actress) (born 1953), American film and television actress
- Christopher Norris (critic) (born 1947), British literary critic and theorist

== See also ==
- Christopher Morris (disambiguation)
