= Arthur James Grant =

English historian (1862–1948)

Arthur James Grant (21 June 1862 – 24 May 1948) was an English historian.

== Early life and education ==
Born in Farlesthorpe, Lincolnshire, Grant was the son of Samuel Grant. He was educated at Boston Grammar School and King's College, Cambridge where he graduated BA in Classics in 1884, with a first class in both parts of the tripos and a distinction in Ancient History. He became a University Extension lecturer.

== Academic career ==
In 1896, Grant was appointed Professor of History and English (later narrowed to History alone) at the Yorkshire College, Leeds (which became the University of Leeds in 1904), where he succeeded Cyril Ransome. Upon his retirement from Leeds in 1927 a drypoint portrait was executed by the artist Malcolm Osborne. He proceeded in that year to a chair at the University of New Zealand. From 1930 to 1932 he was Professor of Modern History at the University of Egypt, Cairo. This period was followed, in the words of one obiturist, by 'quiet years in London, filled with fruitful literary activity'. Grant left London during the Second World War, eventually returning to Leeds.

== Marriage ==
In 1901 Grant married Edith Radford (1863–1929).

== Death ==
Grant died in Headingley on 24 May 1948, aged 85. His ashes are buried with those of his wife at St Chad's Church, Far Headingley, Leeds.

== Works ==
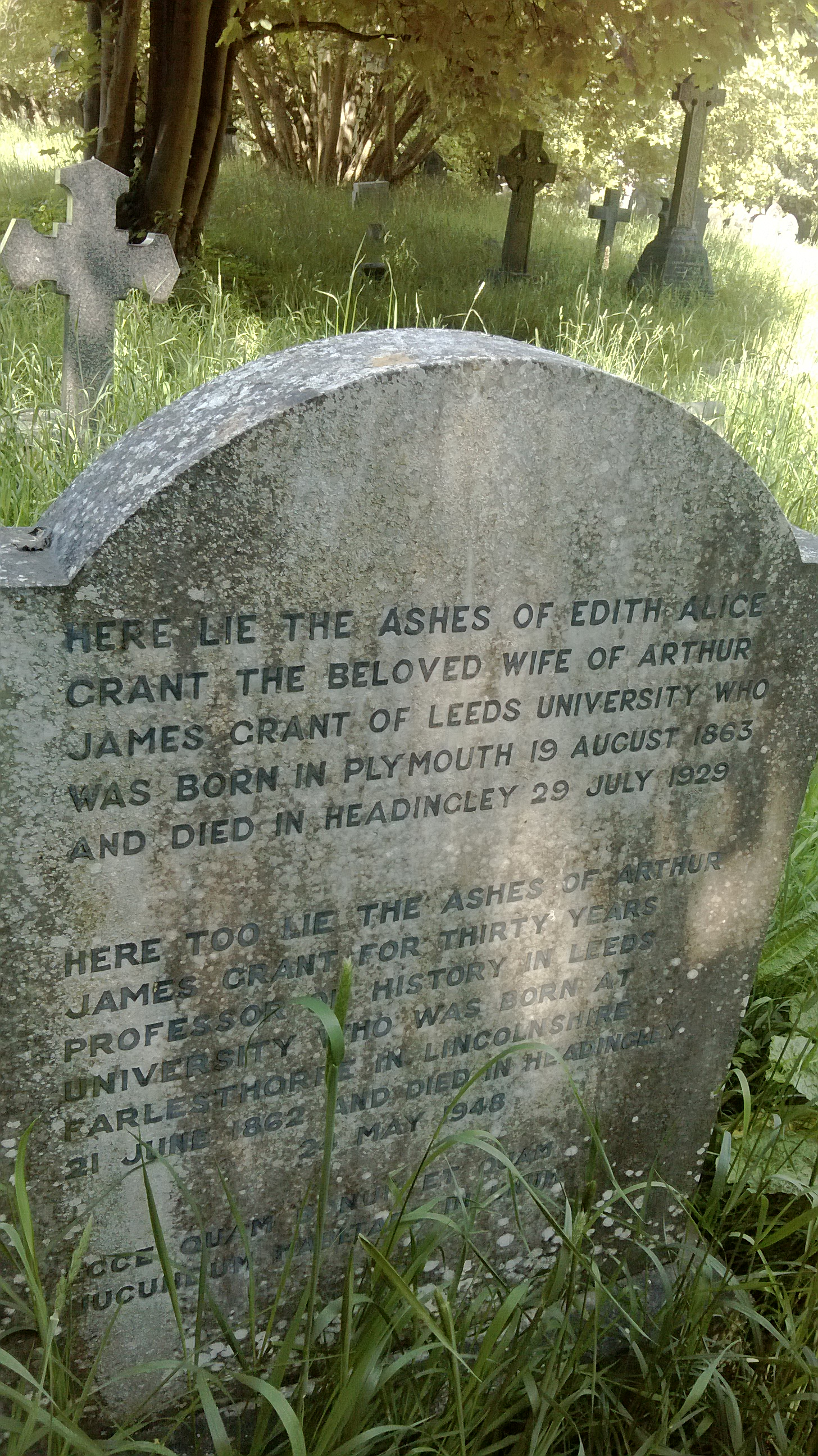
Grave of Grant and his wife in St Chad's, Far Headingley, Leeds

- Greece in the Age of Pericles, 1893
- The French Monarchy (1483-1789), 1900
- English Historians, 1906
- (with H. V. Temperley) Europe in the Nineteenth Century, 1927
- A History of Europe from 1494 to 1610, 1931
- The Huguenots, 1935
