= Ethics (Watsuji book) =

Book by Tetsuro Watsuji

- Cover of the 1996 SUNY edition
- Author: Tetsuro Watsuji
- Original title: Rinrigaku
- Translators: Yamamoto Seisaku; Robert Edgar Carter
- Language: Japanese
- Subject: Ethics
- Published: 1937
- Publication place: Japan
- Media type: Print
- Pages: 381 (1996 SUNY edition)
- ISBN: 978-0791430934

Ethics (Japanese: Rinrigaku) is a work of ethical theory by the Japanese philosopher Tetsuro Watsuji. Steve Odin described Ethics as the premier work of modern Japanese ethical theory.
