= James Bass Mullinger =

- Born: 1834 or 1843; Bishop's Stortford, England, UK
- Died: 22 November 1917 (aged 74–75 or 83–84); Cambridge, England, UK
- Occupations: Writer, librarian, historian, lecturer
- Writing career
- Pen name: J. Bass Mullinger, Theodorus
- Genres: non-fiction, academic history, religious history
- Notable work: History of the University of Cambridge Down to the Decline of the Platonists

James Bass Mullinger (1834 or 1843 – 22 November 1917), sometimes known by his pen name Theodorus, was a British author, historian, lecturer and scholar. A longtime university librarian and lecturer at St. John's College, Cambridge, Mullinger was the author of several books detailing the college's history and similar academic subjects. He was also a contributor to many periodicals of the Victorian era, most especially, Cambridge History of Modern Literature, the Dictionary of National Biography and Encyclopædia Britannica.

His best known effort, History of the University of Cambridge Down to the Decline of the Platonists (1873), was a three-volume history of the university and was considered the definitive work on the subject at the turn of the 20th century. It is today considered a landmark publication in British university history.

== Biography ==
James Mullinger was born in Bishop's Stortford and educated at University College, London, and then admitted as a sizar at St. John's College, Cambridge in 1862. He graduated with double honours in 1866, having taken both the Classical and Moral Science Triposes, and subsequently won the Le Bas, the Hulsean, and the Kaye Prizes.

For a time he was a lecturer at Bedford College, London but eventually decided to teach at his alma mater. Returning to Cambridge, he became Birkbeck lecturer on Ecclesiastical History at Trinity College, and was a lecturer to the Teachers' Training Syndicate on the "History of Education" for ten years. He held a university lectureship in history and was librarian of the historic Library of St. John's College for a number of years.

He authored a number of books while at Cambridge, many of which related to the history of the institution, including Cambridge Characteristics in the 17th Century (1867), The Ancient African Church: Its Rise, Influence, and Decline (1869), The New Reformation, A Narrative of the Old Catholic Movement from 1870 to the Present Time (1875) and The Schools of Charles the Great and the Restoration of Education in the Ninth Century (1877). In 1881, he and Professor Samuel R. Gardiner co-authored Introduction to the Study of English History and, in 1897, collaborated with Rev. J. Howard B. Masterman a treatise on "The Age of Milton," which passed through seven editions. His last two books were History of St. John's College, Cambridge (1901) and Was Ben Jonson Ever a Member of Our College? (1904).

His best known work, however, is the three-volume History of the University of Cambridge Down to the Decline of the Platonists. This project took him well over three decades, Mullinger being devoted to his academic responsibilities as well as being a regular contributor to many encyclopaedias, and journals of the period, with the first volume of the History of Cambridge being published in 1873, the second in 1888 and the final one in 1911. The following year, he received the honorary degree of Doctor of Literature from the university.

Among the publications he worked on included the Cambridge History of Modern Literature, Cambridge Modern History, the Dictionary of Christian Antiquities, Dictionary of National Biography and Encyclopædia Britannica. Although he lived much of his life as "somewhat of a retired scholar", Mullinger enjoyed travelling abroad and compiled a collection of "fine photographs of buildings of architectural value". He died at Cambridge on 22 November 1917, at the age of 74.

== Bibliography ==
- Cambridge Characteristics in the 17th Century: Or the Studies of the University and Their Influence on the Character and Writings of the Most Distinguished Graduates during that Period (1867)
- The Ancient African Church: Its Rise, Influence, and Decline (1869)
- The University of Cambridge from the Earliest Times to the Royal Injunctions of 1535 (1873)
- The New Reformation, A Narrative of the Old Catholic Movement from 1870 to the Present Time (1875)
- The Schools of Charles the Great and the Restoration of Education in the Ninth Century (1877)
- Introduction to the Study of English History (1881, co-written with S.R. Gardiner)
- The Age of Milton (1897, co-written with Rev. J. Howard B. Masterman)
- History of St. John's College, Cambridge (1901)
- Was Ben Jonson Ever a Member of Our College? (1904)
