= Edward William Watson =

Edward William Watson (1859–1936) was Regius Professor of Ecclesiastical History at the University of Oxford.

== Selected publications ==
- Ashmore, Co. Dorset. A history of the parish. With index to the Registers 1651 to 1820
- Church and state in England to the death of Queen Anne, Longmans, Green and Co., London, 1917. (With Henry Melvill Gwatkin)
- Life of Bishop John Wordsworth, Longmans, Green and Co., London, 1915.
- The Church of England, Williams and Norgate, London, 1914. (Home University Library of Modern Knowledge)
