= Christopher Morris (historian) =

British historian

Geoffrey Christopher Morris (24 January 1906 – 16 February 1993) was a British historian and fellow of King's College, University of Cambridge, whose book on Tudor political thought was described by Geoffrey Elton as a "brilliant summary".

== Early life ==
Geoffrey Christopher Morris was born on 24 January 1906 in Great Bookham, Surrey. He went up to King's College, Cambridge in 1924.

== Career ==
Morris became a fellow of King's by dissertation. He stayed with the college until his retirement in 1971. His first specialism was in Tudor and Stuart constitutional history and he later taught the standard course on political thought from Plato to Rousseau. He was known for his range and his ability to produce a paper on a given subject with ease. He was also noted for his interest in his students.

He edited The Journeys of Celia Fiennes (1947). His survey, Political Thought in England: Tyndale to Hooker (1953), argued that political thought in the Tudor age was still largely medieval and that actors subordinated the state to society. Geoffrey Elton, who agreed, described the book in England under the Tudors (1955) as a "brilliant summary".

Morris began a history of western political thought but only completed volume 1 (Plato to Augustine, 1967), being overtaken, according to The Independent, by new thinking that left his liberal approach looking outdated.

== Personal life ==
Morris married Helen Soutar in 1933. The couple had a daughter and a son. Their son pre-deceased them.

== Death ==
Morris died in Cambridge on 16 February 1993.

== Selected publications ==
- The Journeys of Celia Fiennes. Edited and with an introduction by Christopher Morris, etc., Cresset Press, London, 1947. (Editor) (Revised edition 1949)
- Political Thought in England: Tyndale to Hooker, Oxford University Press, 1953. (Home University Library of Modern Knowledge)
- The Tudors, B.T. Batsford, London, 1955.
- Western Political Thought Volume 1: Plato to Augustine, Longmans, London, 1967.
