= George Herbert Perris =

George Herbert Perris (1866–1920) was the originator of the Home University Library of Modern Knowledge, a series of popular non-fiction books from the first half of the twentieth century that ran to over 200 volumes.

== Selected publications ==
- Blood and Gold in South Africa: An Answer to Dr. Conan Doyle: Being an examination of his account of the "Causes and Conduct" of the South-African War, International Arbitration Association, London, 1902.
- The Protectionist Peril: An Examination of Mr. Chamberlain's Proposals, Methuen, London, 1903.
- Russia in Revolution, Chapman & Hall, London, 1905.
- Germany and the German Emperor, Andrew Melrose, London, 1912.
- The War Traders: An Exposure, National Peace Council, London, 1914.
- The campaign of 1914 in France and Belgium, Hodder & Stoughton, London, 1915.
- A Short History of War and Peace
- The Battle of the Marne, Methuen, London, 1920.
- The Industrial History of Modern England, London, Kegan Paul, Trench, Trubner & Co., 1920.
