= John Ehrman =

British historian (1920–2011)

John Patrick William Ehrman, FBA (17 March 1920 – 15 June 2011) was a British historian, most notable for his three-volume biography of William Pitt the Younger. He also wrote two volumes of the official British History of the Second World War; "Grand Strategy" Volumes V and VI.

The son of Albert Ehrman, John was educated at Charterhouse School and Trinity College, Cambridge, when the outbreak of war in 1939 interrupted his studies. Ehrman served in the Royal Navy in the Middle East and the Atlantic. He returned to Trinity College after the war and his work gained him the admiration of G. M. Trevelyan and George Clark. He was elected to a Fellowship in 1947. In 1948, Ehrman married a daughter of Vice-Admiral Sir Geoffrey Blake and they had four sons.

J. R. M. Butler, who had been Ehrman's tutor and was the leading spirit behind Britain's official History of the Second World War, chose Ehrman to write the fifth and sixth volumes on Grand Strategy for the series. These were published in 1956 and were well received. Ehrman also wrote The Atomic Bomb (1953), where he explained Britain's involvement in the making and use of the atomic weapon. Due to the classified information that it contained, the book was not published until the early 1990s. In 1957 he delivered the Lees Knowles Lectures at Cambridge.

From 1960 until 1977, he was Treasurer of the Friends of the National Libraries, where he oversaw its growth from a small group to a national institution. From 1971 until 1985, he was a trustee of the National Portrait Gallery and he served on the Committee on the Export of Works of Art from 1970 until 1976. He was also a member of the Royal Commission on Historical Manuscripts from 1976 until 1994 and he ran the National Manuscripts Conservation Trust from 1989 to 1994. He was also twice vice-president of the Navy Records Society.

In 1970, he was elected a Fellow of the British Academy. His three-volume biography of Pitt the Younger is a huge scholarly work, amounting to around 300,000 words of text and 150,000 words of footnotes. Roy Jenkins estimated that it took Ehrman about 40 years to complete but that it was "thoroughness rather than the flickers of alternative temptation which made him slow". Boyd Hilton has claimed that "Pitt dominated the politics of his time and John Ehrman's three-volumes...dominate the historiography. It is hardly a biography, and indeed it is not clear that Pitt had an inner life to biographize, but it is a consummate account of the political 'life and times'. The author's determination to deal with every episode in detail sometimes blurs the perspective, but readers can be assured that each topic has been thoroughly researched and that Ehrman's analysis is invariably judicious".

== Works ==
- The Navy in the War of William III, 1689–1697 (Cambridge University Press, 1953).
- Grand Strategy, Volume V: August 1942 – September 1943 (Her Majesty's Stationery Office, 1956).
- Grand Strategy, Volume VI: October 1944 – August 1945 (Her Majesty's Stationery Office, 1956).
- Cabinet Government and War, 1890–1940 (Cambridge University Press, 1958).
- The British Government and Commercial Negotiations with Europe 1783–1793 (Cambridge University Press, 1962).
- The Younger Pitt in 3 volumes:
  - The Years of Acclaim (Constable, 1969).
  - The Reluctant Transition (Constable, 1983).
  - The Consuming Struggle (Constable, 1996).
- A Half-Century of Controversy: The Alger Hiss Case, pub. CIA website: "Center for the Study of Intelligence", vol. 44, no. 4 (2001).
