= Charles Smyth (priest) =

Chinese-born British Anglican priest and Canon of Westminster (1903–1987)

Charles Hugh Egerton Smyth (31 March 1903 – 29 October 1987) was a British ecclesiastical historian and an Anglican minister who served as canon of Westminster Abbey from 1946 until 1956.

He was born in Ningbo, China and his father, Richard Smyth, was a medical missionary for the Church of Ireland. He was then educated at Repton School and Corpus Christi College, Cambridge. He was awarded Firsts for both parts of the Historical Tripos and he also won the Thirlwall Medal and the Gladstone Prize. In 1925 he was appointed a Fellow of Corpus Christi College and editor of the Cambridge Review. He was regarded as one of the most brilliant and promising of the younger members of the High Table and was noted, according to The Times, for his "incisive and epigrammatic conversation and for the vigour of his Tory radical opinions".

Smyth taught history at Harvard University during 1926–1927. He decided to become a priest and, after his return to Britain, he attended Bath and Wells Theological College. He was ordained deacon in 1929 and to the priesthood in 1930. Smyth then spent the next few years lecturing history at Cambridge before being appointed curate of St Clement's, Barnsbury, Islington in 1933. The next year, he was appointed curate of St Saviour's, Upper Chelsea, which he held until 1936. In 1937 Smyth was elected again as Fellow of Corpus and he also became the dean of the College's chapel.

In 1934 Smyth married Violet Copland.

During the Second World War, Smyth lectured on the history of political thought at Cambridge and resumed his editorship of the Cambridge Review during 1940–1941. He had a high reputation as a teacher and it was commonly expected that he would be appointed to a chair in ecclesiastical history. According to The Times, Smyth's controversial writings and opinions were widely held to be the reason why he was not chosen.

From 1946 until 1956 he was rector of St Margaret's, Westminster and canon of Westminster Abbey. A liberal Catholic and an admirer of the Book of Common Prayer, Smyth revered the Anglican Church of William Laud's time. On the tercentenary of the execution of Charles I, he took great pleasure in delivering a sermon in the parish church of the House of Commons that praised Charles' virtues.

He retired due to ill health and then became a private scholar at Cambridge. In 1959 his biography of Cyril Garbett was published.

== Works ==
- Cranmer and the Reformation under Edward VI (1926).
- The Art of Preaching: A Practical Survey of Preaching in the Church of England, 747–1939 (1940).
- Simeon and Church Order: A Study of the Origins of the Evangelical Revival in Cambridge in the Eighteenth Century (1940).
- The Friendship of Christ: A Devotional Study (1945).
- The Appeal of Rome: Its Strength and its Weakness (1946).
- Church and Parish: Studies in Church Problems: The Bishop Paddock Lectures for 1953-4 (1955).
- Cyril Forster Garbett, Archbishop of York (1959).
- The Two Families (1962).
- The Church and the Nation: Six Studies in the Anglican Tradition (1962).
