= Christopher Morris (accountant) =

British accountant (1942–2015)

- Born: 28 April 1942
- Died: 11 March 2015 (aged 72)
- Occupation: accountant

Christopher Morris (28 April 1942 – 11 March 2015) was an English accountant who was liquidator of some of the most notable British business failures of the twentieth century, such as Bank of Credit & Commerce International, Laker Airways and Polly Peck.
