= William Shaw (philosopher) =

American philosopher and professor

William H. Shaw (William Harry Shaw) was born on July 31, 1948. He is a professor and former Chair of the Philosophy Department at San Jose State University. He is the author of Marx's Theory of History, Business Ethics, 4th ed., Moral Issues in Business, 8th ed. (with Vincent Barry), and Contemporary Ethics: Taking Account of Utilitarianism.

== See also ==
- American philosophy
- Ethics
- Business ethics
- Utilitarianism
- List of American philosophers
