= G. G. Coulton =

Historian

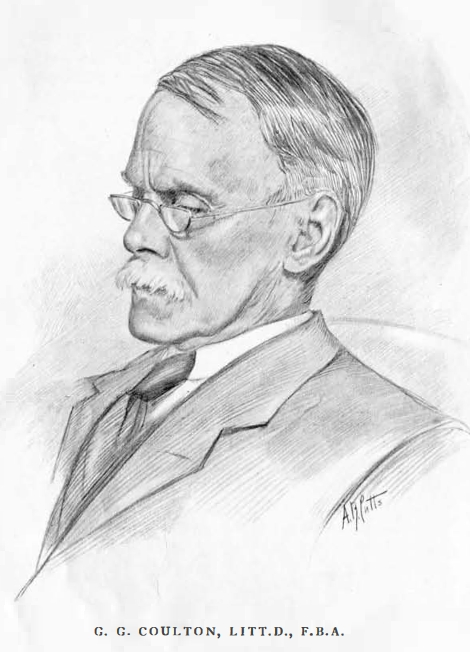
1930 sketch

George Gordon Coulton FBA (15 October 1858 – 4 March 1947) was a British historian, known for numerous works on medieval history. He was known also as a keen controversialist.

Coulton was born in King's Lynn and educated at King's Lynn Grammar School, Felsted School, and St Catharine's College, Cambridge.

He taught for a short period, and was ordained in 1883. He did not however pursue a life in the Church of England, due to the absence of vocation, and took further teaching jobs, beginning as an independent scholar to study the history of the Middle Ages. A fierce anti-Catholic, he was often, especially during the 1930s, embroiled in embittered journalistic controversy with Hilaire Belloc, who detested him.

In 1911 Coulton found a lecturing position at the University of Cambridge. He became a Fellow of St John's College, Cambridge in 1919, and a Fellow of the British Academy in 1929.

== Works ==
- Father Rhine (1898) travel writing
- "The Monastic Legend: A Criticism of Abbot Gasquet's Henry VIII and the English Monasteries" (1905), article, Medieval Studies, issue 1.
- Friar's Lantern (1906)
- Pearl. A Fourteenth-Century Poem (1906) translator
- From Saint Francis to Dante. Translations from the Chronicle of the Franciscan Salimbene (1221 - 1288) (1907)
- Chaucer and his England (1908) - Reprinted in 1993 by Bracken Books.
- A Medieval Garner (1910)
- Life in the Middle Ages (1910; revised 1928 in four volumes)
- French Monasticism in 1503 (1915)
- The Main Illusions of Pacificism: a Criticism of Mr. Norman Angell and of the Union of Democratic Control (1916)
- The Plain man's religion in the Middle Ages (1916) pamphlet
- The Case for Compulsory Military Service (1917)
- Social Life in Britain from the Conquest to the Reformation (1918)
- Christ, St Francis and To-Day (1919)
- The Roman Catholic Church and the Bible. Some Historical Notes (1921) booklet
- Monasticism: Its Cause and Effects. Sketch of the Social and Intellectual Part Played By World History By the Monastic Institution
- Infant Perdition in the Middle Ages (1922)
- Papal Infallibility (1922)
- A Victorian Schoolmaster: Henry Hart of Sedbergh (1923)
- The Death Penalty for Heresy from 1164 to 1921 AD (1924)
- Roman Catholic Truth: An Open Discussion between G. G. Coulton and L. J. Walker (1924)
- The Medieval Village (1925) Medieval Village, Manor & Monastery
- Art and the Reformation (1928) also as Medieval Faith And Symbolism and Fate of Medieval Art in the Renaissance & Reformation
- Miracle of the Blessed Virgin Mary (1928) editor
- The Inquisition (1929)
- Modern Faith (1929)
- The Black Death (1929)
- Crusades, Commerce and Adventure (1930)
- The Works of Liudprand of Cremona (1930) edited with Eileen Power
- Malta - And Beyond (1930) pamphlet
- Froissart and His Chronicles: The Chronicler of European Chivalry (1930)
- The Medieval Scene (1930)
- Ten Medieval Studies, with Four Appendices (1930)
- Romanism And Truth (1930, two volumes)
- In Defence of the Reformation (1931)
- Some Problems in Medieval Historiography (1932) Raleigh Lecture
- Two saints: St. Bernard & St. Francis (1932)
- Scottish Abbeys and Social Life
- The Meaning of Medieval Moneys (1934)
- Commentary on the Rule of St Augustine By Robertus Richardinus (1935) editor
- H. W. Fowler (1935)
- The Faith of St. Thomas More (1935)
- Sectarian History: A Fresh Development (1937) pamphlet
- The Scandal of Cardinal Gasquet (1937) pamphlet
- Inquisition and Liberty (1938)
- Medieval Panorama (1938, 2 volumes)
- Studies in Medieval Thought (1940)
- Europe's Apprenticeship - a Survey of Medieval Latin with Examples (1940)
- Fourscore Years: an Autobiography (1943), winner of the James Tait Black Memorial Prize
- Is The Catholic Church Anti-Social? (1946) with Arnold Lunn
- Stained Glass of the 12th and 13th Centuries from French Cathedrals (1951) with Marcel Aubert
- Five Centuries of Religion (1927-1950) in four volumes: I St. Bernard, his predecessors and successors, 1000-1200 AD, II The friars and the dead weight of tradition, 1200-1400 AD, III Getting & spending, IV The last days of medieval monachism
