= Ethics (Abelard) =

Philosophical treatise written by Abelard

Ethica
- Also known as: Scito te ipsum
- Author(s): Peter Abelard
- Language: Latin
- Date: c. 1138–1139
- Genre: Philosophy

The Ethica (Ethics), also known as Scito te ipsum (Know Yourself), is a twelfth-century philosophical treatise by Peter Abelard. In it, Abelard argues that sin or "scorn for God" is fundamentally a matter of consent, not deeds.

== Background and publication history ==
Abelard and other medieval philosophers wrestled with the problem of sin. The essential penitentials of Abelard's time implied that both thoughts and actions constituted sin, with the Decretum by Burchard of Worms going so far as to suggest that planning to commit wrongful acts was indistinguishable from performing them. These penitentials, however, neglected to consider the role of one's intentions or motives.

Abelard departs from these prevailing conceptions of sin in the Ethica, which he completed in 1138 or 1139, shortly after finishing a commentary on the Epistle to the Romans. The subtitle of the work, Scito te ipsum, (Note: According to Willemien Otten, "In the context of twelfth-century thought, this Socratic motto might be described as 'know yourself,' with a more autobiographical appeal, or alternatively as 'one does well to know oneself,' in a more generic, anthropological sense.") was a "popular motto among monastic writers of the time". Abelard's treatise was originally planned as a two-volume work, but he shelved the latter half (which would have revolved around what it means to live virtuously) after writing just one page.

Most of the text's surviving copies were produced in the fourteenth and fifteenth centuries; two of the earliest known manuscripts of the Ethica, dating to the twelfth century, are housed in the Bavarian State Library.

== Content ==
Abelard defines peccatum or sin as that which is worthy of God's damnation and must be repented of. However, he also argues that the content of peccatum proprie (proper sin) is subjective: one is guilty of "scorn for God" if one does not do what one sincerely believes God requires one to do, even if one's beliefs are erroneous. Abelard locates proper sin in one's consensus (consent) to perform an action, (Note: The term consensus was frequently employed in writings that predated the Ethica, but not in the sense of "consent to perform an action".) not the voluntas (desire or will) to do it and less so the actual operationem peccati or performance of the action. He elaborates that "we consent to that which is not allowed when we do not at all draw back from carrying it out and are entirely ready to do it, if the chance is given."

Voluntas is not a necessary precondition for sin, since one can unwillingly consent to sin: "Sometimes we sin without any bad will at all." He cites the hypothetical example of a servant who, in a state of duress, kills his "bloodthirsty master" in self-defence. (Note: This example is borrowed from Augustine of Hippo's De libero arbitrio.) Abelard maintains that the servant did not willingly consent to killing his master, although his consent arose from a certain will to live. Accordingly, Abelard submits that willing to do something in order to achieve something else (for instance, "willing to kill to live") is fundamentally different from willing to do something (simply "willing to kill"), nor does the former imply the latter. To avoid this confusion, Abelard subsequently proposes that what is said to be "willed", as in the case of the servant, should be more precisely described as "endured".

Abelard then introduces the deontological notion of quod non convenit, or "unfitting" deeds prohibited by God. Recalling his earlier point that actual sin arises from knowingly consenting to what one merely believes to be unfitting, Abelard suggests that one could commit truly unfitting deeds without sinning, depending on one's intentio or reasons for consent. He therefore concludes that, "properly speaking", infidels who sincerely believe themselves to be honouring God cannot be guilty of sin, even if their actions (and intentions) are, in fact, not good: "What contempt of God do they have in what they do for God and on account of which judge themselves to do well?" Nevertheless, they are liable to divine punishment too, which is why Jesus cried out on the cross, "Father, forgive them; for they know not what they do."

It follows, in Abelard's telling, that divine moral precepts like the Ten Commandments fundamentally relate to one's consent of external actions, not the actions in and of themselves. In practice, consent is apparently synonymous with irresistible temptation, thus external actions are not within one's control, but consent is: "The less something is in our power, the less fitting it is to command it." Moreover, Abelard submits that one's standing before God is fixed and cannot be altered "once an individual has consented to an act", even if it were possible to not perform it afterwards. In Abelard's view, a sinner's reconciliation with God requires repentance, confession, and satisfaction through penance.

== Aftermath ==
Abelard himself anticipated criticism of his theory of sin: "There are those who are not a little upset when they hear us say that the act of sin adds nothing to guilt or damnation before God." Indeed, in 1140, at the urging of Bernard of Clairvaux, the Council of Sens formally condemned Abelard for suggesting that actions in themselves were "morally indifferent". However, the ideas of the Ethica were echoed in many subsequent medieval treatises, including those of Richard of Saint Victor and Thomas Aquinas.
