= Williams and Norgate =

Publisher

Williams and Norgate were publishers and book importers in London and Edinburgh. They specialized in both British and foreign scholarly and scientific literature.

Williams & Norgate was founded in the winter of 1842 by Edmund Sydney Williams (1817–1891) and Frederick Norgate (1817–1908). They originally had offices at 14 Henrietta Street, Covent Garden, London, which they took over from Mr. Marseille Middleton Holloway of Holloway & Son Publishers with whom both were acquainted, on a lease from William Russell, 8th Duke of Bedford. They expanded to include a second shop at 20 South Frederick Street in Edinburgh Scotland by 1860. By 1926 they were listed as being located at 11 Henrietta Street and in 1928 the firm was purchased by Allen & Unwin

Among other things, they published the periodicals Natural History Review, The Theological Review and The Hibbert Journal, as well as books by Thomas Henry Huxley (including his Evidence as to Man's Place in Nature) and books by Herbert Spencer. In 1911 they began the Home University Library of Modern Knowledge and in 1924 published Alumni Dublinenses.

== Book series ==
- Crown Theological Library
- Home University Library of Modern Knowledge
