= Home University Library of Modern Knowledge =

Non-fiction book series

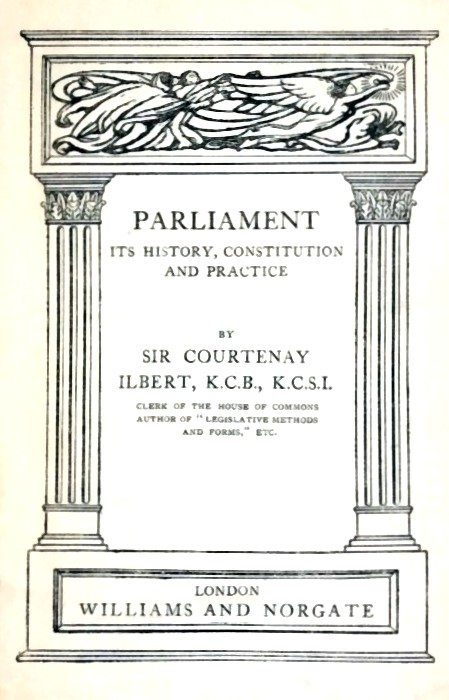
The title page of the first book in the series, Parliament: Its History, Constitution and Practice by Courtenay Ilbert, 1911.

The Home University Library of Modern Knowledge was a series of popular non-fiction books from the first half of the twentieth century that ran to over 200 volumes. The authors were eminent scholars in their fields and included Isaiah Berlin, Harold J. Laski, Hilaire Belloc, Bertrand Russell and John Masefield.

== Origins ==
The first book in the series was Parliament: Its History, Constitution and Practice by Courtenay Ilbert, published in 1911 by Williams and Norgate in London and Henry Holt and Company in New York. The general editors were H.A.L. Fisher and Gilbert Murray. The idea for the series came from George Herbert Perris who was the assistant editor.

== Bought by Oxford University Press ==
In 1928 the series was bought for £10,700 by Thornton Butterworth from Williams and Norgate. Oxford University Press were the under-bidder. Oxford had another chance to buy the series when the offices of Thornton Butterworth were destroyed in The Blitz in 1940. Eyre & Spottiswoode took most of the Thornton Butterworth business but Oxford were able to acquire the Home University Library for only £4750. G.N Clark replaced H.A.L. Fisher as one of the editors. By 1940, the series was becoming a little stale. It was nearly 30 years old and a number of titles in the series were selling only 100s each year. Despite this, total sales of Home University Library volumes were one million volumes over 80 titles in the first two years following the acquisition by Oxford. The series helped the university reach a wider audience and as a non-fiction series was complementary to The World's Classics which reprinted great works of literary fiction.

== Later years ==
In 1966, the series was renamed OPUS (Oxford Paperback University Series). New titles continue to be published under that name by Oxford University Press.

== See also ==
- List of titles in the Home University Library of Modern Knowledge
