= Statute roll =

A statute roll is a manuscript parchment roll with the text of statutes passed by the medieval Parliament of England. The statute rolls are also called Tower rolls since they were kept in the Wakefield Tower of the Tower of London until the 1850s.

At the end of a medieval parliament, a collection of acts of a public character was made in the form of a statute roll and given the title of the king's regnal year; each particular act of Parliament forming a section, or a chapter, of the complete statute, so that, e.g. the Vagabonds Act 1383 became 7 Ric. 2. c. 5.

The first statute roll is the Statute of Gloucester of 1278. Before 1278 there were Coram Rege Rolls (from 1194), Fine Rolls (from 1199), Charter Rolls (from 1199), Patent Rolls (from 1202) and Close Rolls (from 1205). The idea that Magna Carta was the first statute on the first roll is a mistake.

The statute rolls were discontinued in 1469 when Acts of Parliament in their final form began to be enrolled on parliament rolls. Until 1483, parliament rolls recorded parliamentary proceedings (petitions, bills and answers, both public and private) which formed the basis of Acts of Parliament, but seldom the statutes themselves. From 1483 to 1534, both public and private Acts were enrolled in parliament rolls; after 1535, only those private Acts for which an enrolment fee was paid appear, and from 1593 only the titles of private Acts are mentioned in the parliament rolls. By 1629, all proceedings other than the Acts themselves disappeared from the parliament rolls and from 1759 the titles of private Acts disappeared too.

The statute rolls were translated and printed in the first two volumes of The Statutes of the Realm (9 volumes, Record Commission, 1810–1828).
