= Samuel Ayscough =

English writer and scholar (1745–1804)

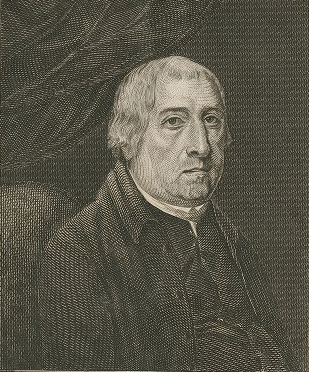
- Portrait of Samuel Ayscough, c. 1770
- Born: 29 November 1745; Nottingham, England
- Died: 30 October 1804 (aged 58); London, England
- Occupations: Writer; scholar

Samuel Ayscough (29 November 1745 – 30 October 1804) was an English writer and scholar. He was best known for publishing his Index on Shakespeare (1790). His index was revised and expanded by English writer Mary Cowden Clarke. He was described as the "Prince of Index Makers" and was very well known throughout his lifetime.

== Early life and education ==
Samuel Ayscough was the grandson of William Ayscough, a stationer and printer of Nottingham, where he introduced the art of typography about 1710, and died on 2 March 1719, and the son of George Ayscough, who carried on his father's business for over forty years.

George Ayscough was esteemed in the neighbourhood and connected with some of the most respectable families in the county. His first wife died childless. He then married Edith, daughter of Benjamin Wigley of Wirksworth, Derbyshire, by whom he had a son, Samuel, and a daughter, Anne. He inherited a good business, but instead of devoting his energies to its development, launched into various speculations, including one to extract gold from the dross of coals. Having gradually spent nearly all his money, in about 1762 he took a large farm at Wigston, Leicestershire, where he was still less fortunate, losing not only the remainder of his property, but the fortunes of his two children.

Samuel Ayscough was born in 1745 and educated at the free grammar school in Nottingham. The son assisted his father during the successive failures of business, speculations and farming. At last, when complete ruin confronted the family, Samuel hired himself to manage a mill in the neighbourhood and laboured as a miller to keep his father and sister. The new start in life proved unsuccessful, but an old friend and schoolfellow, John Eamer (later Lord Mayor of London), heard of his distress and sent for him in about 1770 to come to London, clothed him, and obtained him a situation as an overseer of street paviours (road-surface constructors).

== Career ==
Soon afterwards Ayscough joined the shop of John Rivington, bookseller, of St Paul's Churchyard, and then obtained an engagement at a modest salary as an assistant in the cataloguing department of the British Museum, under the principal librarian. This marked a turning-point of him. His value was soon recognised with a small pay increase, and he was able to spend some of his leisure arranging private libraries. These additions to his income and some further assistance from Eamer allowed him to send for his father, whom he kept in comfort until his death in November 1783.

Ayscough's assiduous catalogue of undescribed manuscripts in the British Museum began in April 1780 and was published in 1782 by leave of the trustees, but as a private venture by the compiler. The plan of the book was original and its publication reflects credit on the enterprise of Ayscough, who claims that no work of like extent was ever completed in so short a time. He acknowledges help received from previous catalogues and occasionally from frequenters of the reading room, but to all intents the two quarto volumes were Ayscough's unaided efforts. He states that it was drawn up on 20,000 separate slips of paper. Each manuscript was specially examined. The classification is ample and two indexes, the first of the manuscripts and pages of the catalogue where they are described, and the second of all names mentioned in the two volumes, facilitate reference to the book.

In 1783, Ayscough issued anonymously a pamphlet in reply to the Letters of an American Farmer printed the year before by J. Hector St. John de Crèvecœur, a French settler. Ayscough contended that the writer was neither a farmer nor a native of America, and that his sole purpose was to encourage emigration to that country, called by a reviewer in the Gentleman's Magazine "an insidious and fatal tendency, which this writer, as an Englishman, is highly laudable for endeavouring to detect and counteract."

After some 15 years of vainly applying for five different vacancies, Ayscough was appointed an assistant librarian at the museum in about 1785. He had long wished to take holy orders, and despite some difficulties whose nature cannot be traced, managed to do so, although the precise date of his ordination is uncertain. Nichols places it soon after 1785, and a notice of the death of the father supports this view, but he styles himself "clerk" on the title of his Catalogue (1782), while a letter of the father, dated 13 January 1781, styles the son "Rev." He was assigned a curacy at Normanton on Soar, Nottinghamshire, and afterwards an assistant curacy in the London parish of St Giles in the Fields. Here his regular attendance to his duties and character gained him the friendship of John Buckner (afterwards Bishop of Chichester), Richard Southgate, Dr Willis, and others.

A general index to the Annual Register (1758–1780), which came out in 1783, is ascribed to Ayscough, but with insufficient evidence. However, in 1786 the Monthly Review brought out an index to its first 70 volumes compiled by Ayscough, the first volume consisting of the articles and other materials classified under subjects with a full index, and the second forming an alphabetical index to passages in the body of the Review. A continuation extending to the 81st volume, issued in 1796, was by the same hand. His publications so far had been of a private nature; his next appearance was in connection with his official position. The catalogue of books in the British Museum, printed in 1787 in two folio volumes, was compiled by Ayscough along with Paul Henry Maty and S. Harper. On 12 March 1789 he was elected a fellow of the Society of Antiquaries.

All historians of the 18th century make use of Ayscough's share in indexing the Gentleman's Magazine (1731–1786), consisting of two volumes printed in 1789, the first an index of the essays, dissertations and historical passages in one alphabet, and the second divided into four parts, devoted to poetry, names of persons, plates, and books noticed. Useful as it is, the index is not perfect. The lists of persons in each volume were unfortunately not furnished with Christian names, and where more than one referee was concerned, no sort of distinction was introduced. This method was continued by Ayscough in his general index, so that in the case of common names, such as Smith or Williams, there are hundreds of such mixed references. In the continuation on the same plan, published in 1821, the evil is worsened by an increase in the materials, so that there are 2,411 entries under Smith without further particulars. It was calculated that referring back would take eighty hours of hard work to distinguish the Smiths alone.

Until Ayscough brought out his Index in 1790 there had been no concordance to Shakespeare. This was a speculation on the part of the publisher, John Stockdale, who paid 200 guineas for the index, which was designed to accompany his two-volume edition of the Dramatic Works. Here the words are arranged alphabetically with the lines in which they occur, then the name of the play, and in five separate columns the act, scene, page, column and line. The last three particulars refer only to the edition of 1790, but the index may be made to serve any other text. Francis Twiss compiled his Verbal Index in 1805; both were superseded by Mrs Cowden Clarke's Concordance of 1845. All three are devoted to the plays alone and are supplemented by Mrs Furness's Concordance to Shakespeare's Poems (1874). There was still no complete concordance to the entire works in the late 19th century.

Ayscough was chosen to deliver the Fairchild lectures, inaugurated in 1729 by Thomas Fairchild, of Shoreditch, who bequeathed a sum of money for a sermon on each Whit Tuesday on the "Wonderful Works of God in the Creation". The first such was preached by Ayscough in 1790 before the Royal Society at the church of St Leonard's, Shoreditch. He completed the series of 15 sermons in 1804. They were to have been printed after his death, but never appeared.

Thomas Birch had left for press among his papers at the Museum a collection of historical letters from the reigns of James VI and I and Charles I, which Ayscough sought to publish, if he could find 200 subscribers at a couple of guineas apiece. It was left to R. F. Williams to carry the scheme into effect in 1849, when the documents were printed in four volumes under the title The Court and Times of James I and Charles I. An important work which remains in manuscript is Ayscough's catalogue of the ancient rolls and charters in the British Museum (now the British Library), forming three large folio volumes, with two indexes, the first to names of places and some other matters, and the second to names of persons. A table of contents records the number of charters, rolls, and seals at 16,000. Preparation of the catalogue took him from 8 May 1787 to 18 August 1792, with a few additions thereafter. It is still in use. Ayscough's last work at the Museum was to arrange the books in classes and catalogue the King's Tracts.

About a year before his death, Samuel Ayscough was presented to the small vicarage of Cudham in Kent by John Scott, 1st Earl of Eldon. Although non-residence was permitted in view of his official position, he fulfilled his religious duties, making the 17-mile journey each Saturday and returning each Monday. He never passed the workhouse without calling to read prayers or to preach. He took great pains to excel as a preacher. The British Library holds Ayscough's copy of Letsome's Preacher's Assistant (1753) marked with the sermons which might be consulted at the British Museum, and with 21 leaves of manuscript additions not noticed by Letsome.

In 1802 he edited, with John Caley, a volume of the patent rolls in the Tower of London for the Record Commission; but he does not seem to have been concerned in the Taxatio Ecclesiastica Nicholai IV (1802), also published by the Record Commission and sometimes ascribed to him.

Besides the many works already mentioned, Ayscough compiled indexes to John Bridges' Northamptonshire, which took him nine months, to Owen Manning and William Bray's Surrey, and according to Nichols, to the New Review, edited by Paul Henry Maty.

== Death ==
Ayscough died of dropsy in the chest at his apartments in the Museum on 30 October 1804. He was buried in the cemetery of St George's, Bloomsbury, behind the Foundling Hospital.

His salary had been recently increased, which added to his clerical post placed him in a position of comparative comfort. He spent the modest income on charitable purposes and scarcely left sufficient to meet the claims upon his executors.

== Assessment ==
Ayscough was termed the "Prince of Index Makers". His indexing life produced him altogether about £1,300, a moderately handsome amount. He did his laborious tasks with skill and diligence. Despite an imperfect education and a youth spent in manual occupations, he gained an extensive knowledge of history, antiquities and bibliography. His skill in palaeography meant he was in demand for copying documents and assisting in arranging the records in the Tower. He frequently contributed to the Gentleman's Magazine.

Although he was somewhat blunt in manner, students found him a ready and accomplished helper. His friend John Nichols paid a touching tribute to his benevolence. He was a tall, bulky figure, as shown by his portrait. A friend tells a story of a young lady reproved for her want of attention when being shown the "curiosities" by Ayscough, "than whom perhaps a kinder hearted, better humoured man never existed," and "who, although an old bachelor, was a great admirer of beauty." One duty of assistant librarians was to take round parties of visitors. Ayscough, unlike some fellow officers, seems to take an interest in doing so.

== Works ==
Besides two contributions to Archaeologia (1797) and his share in the production of several books, Ayscough published the following works:

- A Catalogue of the MSS. preserved in the British Museum hitherto undescribed, consisting of 5,000 volumes, including the collections of Sir Hans Sloane, the Rev. Thomas Birch, and about 500 volumes bequeathed, presented, or purchased at various times, London, 1782, 2 vols
- Remarks on the Letters from an American Farmer; or a detection of the errors of Mr. J. Hector St. John, pointing out the pernicious tendency of those letters to Great Britain, London, 1783 (Anon.)
- A General Index to the Monthly Review from its commencement to the end of the 70th volume [1749–84], London, 1786; a continuation down to the 81st volume (1784–89) was compiled by Ayscough in 1796, 8vo; and there is a continuation by another hand down to 1816
- A General Index to the first fifty-six volumes of the Gentleman's Magazine, from its commencement in 1731 to the end of 1786, London, 1789, 2 vols.; continued by Nichols to 1818, 2 vols., with an index to the plates (1731–1818), by Ch. St. Barbe
- An Index to the remarkable words and passages made use of by Shakespeare, calculated to point out the different meanings to which the words are applied, London, 1790; reprinted in Dublin 1791, and second edition, revised and enlarged, London, 1827; the last is adapted to the edition of the plays published in 1823 by the booksellers
- A general index to the first 20 volumes of the British Critic, in two parts; part i. contains a list of all the books reviewed, part ii. an index to the extracts, criticism, &c.,' London, 1804 (Anon.), continued by Dr Blagdon.

== Writings ==
- An Index to the Remarkable Passages and Words Made Use of by Shakespeare; Calculated to Point out the Different Meanings to Which the Words are Applied
