= Taxatio Ecclesiastica =

Valuation for ecclesiastical taxation

The Taxatio Ecclesiastica, often referred to as the Taxatio Nicholai or just the Taxatio, compiled in 1291–92 under the order of Pope Nicholas IV, is a detailed database valuation for ecclesiastical taxation of English, Welsh, and Irish parish churches and prebends.

== History ==
The Taxatio Ecclesiastica was compiled in furtherance of the collection of a tax on all ecclesiastical property in England and Wales, in order to defray the costs of an expedition to the Holy Land. The Pope promised Edward I one tenth of the annual profits of every ecclesiastical benefice for the endeavour. A further tax, entitled Nova Taxatio, was levied in 1318 by virtue of a royal mandate directed to the Bishop of Carlisle. The Nova Taxatio was conducted largely to pay for the war with Scotland. The database is reportedly "complete or virtually complete for the dioceses of Canterbury, Rochester, London, Lincoln, Norwich, Chichester, Exeter, Hereford, Salisbury, Bath and Wells, Winchester, Worcester, Ely, St Davids, Llandaff, St Asaph and Bangor." Robinson has demonstrated many inaccuracies and omissions in the Taxatio and that it must be exercised with caution as a source. Nonetheless, it remains an important source document for the medieval period.

== Payment dispute ==
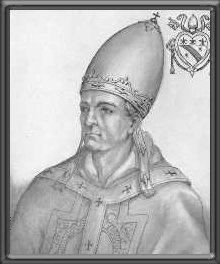
Pope Nicholas IV, who initiated the Taxatio

This taxation is a most important record, because all the taxes of the Church, as well to the kings of England as to the pope, were afterwards regulated by it until the survey made by Henry VIII; and because the statutes of colleges which were founded before the Reformation are also interpreted by this criterion, according to which their benefices, under a certain value, are exempted from the restriction in the statute 21 Henry VIII concerning pluralities. In 1295, Edward, notwithstanding the Pope's grant, and numerous exactions from the clergy in the meantime, being still in great need of money to carry on his wars, summoned deputies from the inferior clergy for the first time to vote him supplies from their own body. In the preceding year he had, by threats and violence, exacted a tax of half the revenues of the clergy; but now he thought it prudent to obtain their consent to his demands in a more regular manner. The clergy, however, would not obey the king's writ of summons, lest they should appear to acknowledge the temporal power; and in order to overcome this objection, the king issued his writ to the archbishop, who, as their spiritual superior, summoned the clergy to meet in convocation.

This was the commencement of the constitutional practice of the clergy meeting in Convocation at the same time as the Lay Parliament, and voting subsidies by its own voluntary act for the service of the state. It was not viewed without alarm by the Pope and the high Church dignitaries; and in order to put a stop to all such exactions of princes from the clergy, Pope Boniface VIII issued a bull in 1296, which forbade churchmen of every degree to pay any tribute, subsidy, or gift to laymen, without authority from the See of Rome; and declared that if they should pay, or princes exact, or any one assist in levying such unauthorised taxes, all such persons respectively would incur the sentence of excommunication. In the same year, however, Edward I demanded of the clergy a fifth of their moveables, which they resisted, on the ground that they could not disobey the Pope; but the king was not inclined to desist, and in order to force the acquiescence of the clergy, he put them out of the pale of the laws. Orders were issued to the judges to hear no cause brought before them by the clergy, but to decide all causes in which they were sued by others. The clergy could not long resist these oppressions; and although unwilling to disobey the Papal Bull, they evaded it by voluntarily depositing a sum equivalent to the amount demanded of them in some church, whence it was taken by the king's officers. In this expedient the whole ecclesiastical body acquiesced, and thus yielded up their spiritual privileges, under coercion by the temporal power.

== Publication ==
An edition of the Taxatio was published by the Record Commission in 1802 as Taxatio Ecclesiastica Angliae et Walliae Auctoritate, edited by Thomas Astle, Samuel Ayscough and John Caley.
