= Inquisition post mortem =

Legal process in feudal England

An Inquisition post mortem (abbreviated to Inq.p.m. or i.p.m., and formerly known as an escheat) (Latin, meaning "(inquisition) after death") is an English medieval or early modern record of the death, estate and heir of one of the king's tenants-in-chief, made for royal fiscal purposes. The process of making such an inquisition was effected by the royal escheators in each county where the deceased held land. The earliest inq.p.m. was made in 1236, in the reign of King Henry III (1216–1272), and the practice ceased c. 1640, at the start of the English Civil War, and was finally abolished by the Tenures Abolition Act 1660, which ended the feudal system.

== Purpose ==
The escheators were ordered by a writ from the king's chancery to investigate the deaths of tenants-in-chief in order to assess what monetary value was due to the king from his so-called feudal incidents, comprising for example feudal relief, wardships, and marriages. Such revenues which resulted from the deaths of his tenants-in-chief formed a significant proportion of the mediaeval royal revenues. The feudal due which was payable to the king on the inheritance of the lands by the tenant's heir is termed a relief, from Latin levo, levare (to lift up), plus re (again), signifying the process of re-elevating the heir to the honourable position of the deceased, as a lord of the manor and tenant-in-chief. The scale of reliefs payable to the king by his tenants-in-chief who held under the feudal land tenure of barony had become a fixed sum under clause two of Magna Carta (1215), but the king nevertheless needed to know who the heir was so payment of the relief could be demanded. If the tenant-in-chief was found to have no heir, for example if he was unmarried or childless, the lands held would "escheat" (i.e. revert to the demesne of the king) to be re-granted as a valuable reward to a favoured courtier or official, or sold for cash proceeds. This aspect of the process was the origin of their former appellation by early Victorian antiquarians of "escheats". If the tenant-in-chief left a minor son as heir, that is to say one aged under 21, his wardship escheated likewise to the king, who was able to sell or award his marriage to a third party. Generally the marriages of such wards were purchased by wealthy men as husbands for their own daughters, and a marriage contract was drawn up at the direction of the bride's father which entailed the ward's future estate onto the progeny of the marriage. Thus the wealthy purchaser's grandchildren became the inheritors of the ward's estate. If the deceased tenant-in-chief left a minor daughter, that is to say one aged under 14, or one younger who was not contracted in marriage, as sole heiress (or more as joint-heiresses), her wardship and marriage likewise escheated to the king. Such wardships constituted a significant part of the royal revenues in mediaeval times.

== Avoidance measures ==
The practice arose amongst tenants-in-chief of transferring the legal title in their lands to feoffees to uses, which effectively established trusts enabling the tenant-in-chief to continue to use the land and its revenues, but to avoid being officially recognised in law as the legal holder. This exempted him from the scope of the Inquisition post mortem, as the legal holders were effectively an immortal corporation one or two of whose constituent feoffees could on occasion die, only to be replaced by others. Such avoidance devices were apparently tolerated by the crown for a considerable time, yet on the accession of King Henry VII (1485–1509) the king's ancient right to his feudal incidents was enforced with determination and ruthlessness.

== Procedure ==
For an heir to inherit his paternal lands a formal and lengthy standard procedure had to be completed, only at the end of which he could "sue out his livery of seisin" (i.e. gain physical possession of his inheritance), so it was in his best interest to get the process started as soon as possible after the death. He himself, or his relatives if a minor, would generally inform the king's chancery that the death had occurred, and this would prompt the production of a writ by the chancery under the king's great seal addressed to the various escheators of the counties in which the deceased held lands, known as a writ diem clausit extremum. This writ, the earliest identified example of which dates from 1254, informed the escheator that the king had been informed (quia datum est nobis intelligi ("because it has been given to us to know")) that the tenant-in-chief named had "closed his last day", as the Latin phrase by which the writ has become known may be translated, and that he was ordered to hold an inquisition post mortem, and to send the resultant report back to the chancery, with his seal and with the writ diem clausit extremum sewn onto it. On receipt of the writ the escheator requested the sheriff of the county concerned to empanell a jury made up of local freeholders, that is to say persons of social standing, who could be relied upon to provide the standard information required in accurate form. Such information, termed "the jurors' 'verdict'" comprised:

- Date of death
- Name of heir
- Age of heir
- Name of manors held in chief
- Name of manors held from other persons
- Extent (i.e. area/size) of manors
- Annual value of manors
- Nature of feudal tenures and services due

The most immediate order in the writ however was that requiring the escheator to take control of all the deceased's demesne lands, i.e. those which had not been sub-enfeoffed to mesne tenants but had been managed in-hand directly by the deceased and his household officials. All revenues resulting from such lands whilst in the hands of the escheator had to be audited (i.e. accounted for before the Barons of the Exchequer) periodically at the treasury.

The end result of the inquisition would be one of the three following, depending on what the jury reported:

- If the vassal had died with an heir who was of age, then a fine was paid to the king for the right of the heir to inherit, namely his relief.
- If the heir was underage, that is to say under 21 for a male and under 14 for a female, then the heir and the lands were placed into royal wardship.
- If there was no heir, then the lands escheated (i.e. reverted) to the king's royal demesne.

== Form of permanent record ==
Inquisitions post mortem (or "escheats") were recorded on two duplicate sheets of parchment. The original return was held in the records of the chancery, to which department the escheator had made his original return, the other by the treasury, which had caused a copy to be made for fiscal purposes, in order to verify the escheator's accounts which were presented to the treasury periodically. Unlike some other series of records, they were not historically sewn together as rolls, but in modern times the parchment sheets have been bound in files with covers, and are today held at the National Archives in Kew. The documents formerly comprising the chancery records are classified under the initial letter "C", whilst those from the exchequer bear the class letter "E". After the establishment of the Court of Wards in 1540 a copy of the Inq.p.m. was also sent to that court, and these records also survive at the National Archives classified as "WARD 7". When an Inq.p.m. had been held not as a result of a writ from chancery but under the escheator's own authority, the verdict was sent to the exchequer only.

== Value as historical source documents ==
Inquisitions post mortem form a valuable source for historians and genealogists, as they not only detail the familial relationships of many of the English nobility and gentry, but also provide information on the history of individual manors, including their size and forms of tenure by which they were held. They thus constitute "one of the most important sources for the social and economic history of mediaeval England". They also provide summaries and terms of settlements made during the lifetime of the deceased, for example settlement to feoffees, the original copy of which has rarely survived.

== Example ==
The following example of the abstracted Latin inq.p.m. of William Pagam (d.1422), published in 1995 as no. 932 in vol. 20, 6–10 Henry V, of the Calendar of Inquisitions Post Mortem, illustrates many common elements:

Writ 24 July 1422. Hampshire. Inquisition. Alton, 26 Aug.

He held of the king in-chief in his demesne as of fee the manor of Drayton, annual value 8 marks, for 6s. 8d. paid to the king by the constable of Porchester Castle at Michaelmas and providing at his own expense for 15 days a hobbler to keep the castle in time of war. By an indenture of 26 Oct. 1418, shown to the jurors, William Tauk, Robert Monkeston and Thomas Welegh, who were seised in their demesne as of fee, granted the manor of Pury, a messuage, carucate and 13 acres meadow, 40 a. pasture and 20 a. wood at "la Bere juxta Southwyke" as lands and tenements in Pury, Badley, "Colvyle", "Holdmede", and "Bere", to William Pagam and his wife Agnes, who survives, for life of Agnes, remainder to William and his heirs in fee simple. The manor of Pury, annual value 6 marks, is held of the king in chief, service unknown. The messuage, carucate, arable, meadow, pasture and wood at "le Bere" annual value 40s. are held of the king in chief for 7s. 4d. paid to the king by the constable of Porchester Castle at Michaelmas. He died on 15 July last. Philip Pagam is his son and next heir, aged 6 years and more. C 138/63, no.26A

Here the manor of Drayton is held by the feudal military tenure of castle-guard; the manor of Pury had been transferred to feoffees to uses, and was re-granted by them in 1418 back to William and his wife for their uses under trust.

== Calendars ==
Printed calendars (abstracted summaries) of almost all the rolls of Inq.p.m.'s have been published in some form, with the exception of the periods 1447–1485 and 1509–1660. An extensive series of calendars extending from the reign of Henry III to that of Richard III, and with an appendix of lists to the reign of James VI and I, was published in four volumes by the Record Commission between 1806 and 1828, edited by John Caley and John Bayley. However, these volumes were later judged by Sir Henry Maxwell Lyte to be of "unsatisfactory character", and to contain many omissions. In 1865 two volumes were published, covering the reigns of Henry III and Edward I, in a new series edited by Charles Roberts entitled Calendarium Genealogicum, which concentrated on providing the names of heirs omitted from the previous publications, designed to be of particular use to genealogists. In 1898 the production of three volumes covering the reign of Henry VII (1485–1509) was started, and was completed in 1955. In 1904 the first volume of a new series of Inq.p.m.'s was published, intended to be more complete and systematic, under Maxwell Lyte's editorship. It covered the reign of Henry III, from 1236, when the practice of producing inq.p.m.'s began. This "first series" continued for 26 volumes, the last volume having been published in 2009, although volumes were not published in chronological order. Winchester University and the Department of Digital Humanities at King's College London are currently working on a project to publish on-line in searchable format a revised and expanded series of all existing texts covering the years 1236–1447 and 1485–1509. The project also aims in the long-term to produce calendars for the first time of the periods 1447–1485 and 1509–1542. A number of county record societies have published calendars of Inq.p.m.'s relating to their own counties, abstracted from the chancery and exchequer rolls.

=== List of published calendars ===
Period covered	Volume no.	Regnal years	Publisher, date, editors	National Archives classes
1236–1272	vol 1	21–57 Henry III	1904	C132; E149
1272–1290	vol 2	1–19 Edward I	1906	C133; E149
1291–1298	vol 3	20–28 Edward I	HMSO, 1912	C133; E149
1299–1307	vol 4	29–35 Edward I	HMSO, 1913	C133; E149
1307–1315	vol 5	1–9 Edward II	HMSO, 1908	C134, E149
1316–1327	Vol.6	10–20 Edward II	1910	C134; E149
1327–1335	Vol.7	1–9 Edward III	HMSO, 1909	C135; E149
1336–1345	Vol.8	10–20 Edward III	1913	C135; E149
1346–1352	Vol.9	21–25 Edward III	1916/17	C135; E149
1353–1360	Vol.10	26–34 Edward III	1921	C135; E149
1361–1364	Vol.11	35–38 Edward III	1935	C135; E149
1365–1369	Vol.12	39–43 Edward III	1938	C135; E149
1370–1373	Vol.13	44–47 Edward III	1954/5	C135; E149
1374–1377	Vol.14	48–51 Edward III	1952	C135; E149
1377–1384	Vol 15	1–7 Richard II	HMSO,1970	C136; E149
1384–1392	Vol 16	7–15 Richard II	HMSO, 1974	C136; E149
1392–1399	Vol 17	15–23 Richard II	HMSO,1988	C136; E149
1399–1405	Vol 18	1–6 Henry IV	HMSO,1987	C137; E149
1405–1413	Vol 19	7–14 Henry IV	HMSO, 1992	C137; E149
1413–1418	Vol 20	1–5 Henry V	HMSO, 1995	C138; E149
1418–1422	Vol 21	6–10 Henry V	Boydell & Brewer, 2002, ed. J.L.Kirby, Janet H. Stevenson	C138; E149
1422–1427	Vol 22	1–5 Henry VI	Boydell & Brewer, 2003, ed. Kate Parkin, Janet H. Stevenson	C139; E149
1427–1432	Vol 23	6–10 Henry VI	Boydell & Brewer, 2004, ed. Claire Noble	C139; E149
1432–1437	Vol 24	11–15 Henry VI	Boydell Press, 2010, ed. M.L.Holford, S.A.Mileson, C.V.Noble, Kate Parkin	C139; E149
1437–1442	Vol 25	16–20 Henry VI	Boydell Press, 2009, ed. Claire Noble	C139; E149
1442–1447	Vol 26	21–25 Henry VI	Boydell Press, 2009, ed. M.L. Holford	C139; E149
1447–1461	uncalendared		consult original documents only	C139; E149
1461–1483	uncalendared		consult original documents only	C140; E149
1483–1485	vol 35	Edward V; 1–3 Richard III	Boydell and Brewer, 2021, ed. G. KcKelvie, M. Hicks	C141; E149
1485–1496	Vol. 1	1–12 Henry VII	Second Series, HMSO, 1898	C142; E150
1496–1504	Vol. 2	13–20 Henry VII	Second Series, HMSO, 1915	C142; E150
1504–1509	Vol. 3	20–24 Henry VII	Second Series, HMSO, 1955	C142; E150
1509–1660	uncalendared		consult original documents only	C142; E150

== See also ==
- Proof of age inquisition

== Sources ==
=== Books ===
- Brown, William. Preface to Yorkshire Inquisitions of the Reigns of Henry III and Edward I, Vol. I, Yorkshire Archaeological Society, Record Series, p.iii, 1892
- Carpenter, Christine (2003). "Introduction". In Parkin, Kate; Stevenson, Janet H. (eds.). Calendar of Inquisitions Post Mortem. Vol. 22, 1422–1427. Boydell & Brewer.
- Lyon, Bryce Dale (1980). A Constitutional and Legal History of Medieval England (Second ed.). New York: Norton. ISBN 0-393-95132-4.
- Hicks, Michael (2012). The Fifteenth-Century Inquisitions Post Mortem: A Companion. Woodbridge: Boydell. ISBN 9781843837121.
- Maxwell Lyte, H. C. (1904). "Introduction". In Sharp, J. E. E. S. (ed.). Calendar of Inquisitions Post Mortem. Vol. 1 (Henry III). London: His Majesty's Stationery Office. pp. vii–ix.
