= Select Committee on the State of Public Records =

United Kingdom House of Commons select committee

- Select Committee appointed to enquire into the State of Public Records of the Kingdom, and other Public Instruments, Rolls, &c.
- Formation: February 13, 1800
- Founder: Dr Lushington MP
- Dissolved: July 4, 1800
- Purpose: To inquire into the state of public records in England, Scotland and Ireland.
- Key people: See § membership
- Parent organization: House of Commons
- Website: First and Second Report

The Select Committee on the State of Public Records was a select committee of the House of Commons of the Parliament of the United Kingdom appointed to investigate and report on the nature and condition of public records. Recommendations by the committee led to the appointment of the first Record Commission.

== Background ==
Public record keeping had a long tradition in the United Kingdom, the requirement for accessibility to the public present in some of the earliest Rolls of Parliament. Queen Elizabeth I instituted an inquiry into the parliamentary, chancery and exchequer rolls and sought the recovery of dispersed charters, and King James I established a State Paper Office and Office of General Remembrance of Matters of Record.

In 1604, the House of Commons moved for a special record repository and in 1620 the House of Lords appointed a committee to search for records. Soon after, King Charles I established a commission for searching after all records belonging to the crown. These efforts were thwarted by the English Civil War, although during the Restoration King Charles II established the Office for State Papers and reformed the Treasuries of the Common Courts.

Queen Anne authorised the publication of the Compilation of State Papers and Records, also known as Rymer's Foedera, published in 20 volumes between 1704 and 1735, as well the Inquiry into the State of our Domestic Records, led by Lord Halifax and Lord Somers. In 1704, the Lords referred the question of the nature and condition of parliamentary records to a committee, which led to improvements in the storage of records, especially in the Jewel Tower of the Palace of Westminster. In April 1725, the House of Lords appointed a committee to view the parliamentary records and inspect others lying in disorder in the palace.

Following the 1731 Fire of Cotton Library, the House of Commons instigated an inquiry into public record keeping. The committee received 18 returns from repositories, leading to the publication of the Table of the Records of the Kingdom on 9 May 1732.

In 1772, the House of Commons appointed a committee to investigate the state of records in the Rolls Chapel, which found that records were damaged by age, damp, heat and transportation. The work of the committee led to the establishment of clerk of the Rolls Chappel records in 1784.

By 1800, it was widely recognised that public record keeping was poor, with records disparate, undescribed and kept in bad conditions. It had been 70-years since any parliamentary proceedings on public record keeping, during which time the volume of records had greatly increased. Furthermore, no parliamentary inquiry had extended to courts (maritime or ecclesiastical), cathedrals, universities, bespoke collections (including the Royal, Slonian and Harleian collections), the British Museum or any public repositories in Scotland.

The Parliament of the United Kingdom, formed in 1800, following the Acts of Union 1800 devoted much attention to the consolidation of public records.

== Establishment ==
The committee was established on 18 February 1800 to "Inquire into the State of the Public Records of the Kingdom, and other Public Instruments, Rolls, Books, and Papers, as they shall think proper; and to report to the House the Nature and Condition thereof, together with what they shall judge fit to be done for the better Arrangement, Preservation, and more convenient Use of the same."

The committee was given the power to "send for persons, paper and records" and to freely search all offices and places where any records were kept, without paying any fees.

=== Membership ===
The committee was appointed on 18 February 1800, consisting of 17 members with a quorum of five.

Name	Commentary
Charles Abbot	Chairman.
Spencer Perceval	
Sir Richard Arden	Master of the Rolls
Charles Bragge	
John Mitford	Attorney General
William John Bankes	
Sir William Grant	Solicitor General
Isaac Hawkins Browne	
Sir William Scott	
Nicholas Vansittart	
Richard Ryder	
Robert Dundas	Lord Advocate
Robert Jenkinson, 2nd Earl of Liverpool	
Charles Yorke	
William Douglas	
George Rose	
Henry Williams-Wynn	Added on 21 February 1800.

=== Staffing ===
The committee was supported by clerks, librarians and lawyers, including.

Name	Occupation
Alexander Luders	Barrister at Law
Joseph Planta	Principal Librarian of the British Museum
John Caley	Keeper of the Records of the Augmentation Office
George Vanderzee	Clerk in the King's Remembrancer Office in the Exchequer
Jonathan Hewlett	Clerk in the Office of the Prothonotaries in the Court of Common Pleas
Thomas Bryan Richards	Researcher
Samuel Gunnell	Clerk to The committee

== Proceedings ==
The committee had its first meeting on 19 February 1800. The committee proceeded by preparing a list of all the public repositories in England and Scotland, classed under "General Repositories", "Houses of Parliament", "Offices of State", "Courts of Justice", "Cathedrals and Universities", "Inns of Court" and "Public Libraries. For each repository, the committee requested returns to ascertain the nature and condition of its contents. The committee also visited principal repositories in London in person and conducted special searches, revealing previously unknown records. Finally, the committee produced a systematic view of all public records, arranged under the divisions of "Constitution", "Government" and "Jurisprudence".

On 23 April 1800, on the motion of Charles Abbot, the committee requested all records and papers held under the care of the House of Lords. On 18 June 1800, the Lords submitted an enumerated list and confirmed that records and papers held by them were in good condition, being methodically kept and arranged. The Lords also confirmed that they were producing an Index to the Rolls of Parliament, to be ready Christmas 1801, and a Glossary of obsolete terms used in the rolls, on hold due to illness of the editor.

The committee reported on 4 July 1800. The first report covered the result of the committees inquiries, the proceedings of the committee and an examination of further measures to adopt for the future preservation, arrangement and publication of records. The committee found that many public records dated back over 700 years, with some going back to the Domesday Book, though many were lost during periods of civil unrest. The committee identified serious issues with record storage, with many important documents kept in unsafe private buildings at risk of fire and damp The committee also found widespread problems with indexing and cataloguing, making many collections difficult to access and use, compounded by record-keeping practices varying widely between different repositories and offices. The committee made recommendations for the creation of purpose-built public record offices accessible for researchers, for the creation and printing of comprehensive calendars and indexes, for the standardisation of record keeping practices and for the improved administration and regulation of record offices. The committee paid particular attention to Scotland's system of public records, which they considered exemplary, noting its centralised General Register House and comprehensive registration system.

The second report provided analysis of the contents of all returns transmitted to The committee and arranged these records into two distinct tables, firstly a systematic classification under heads of "Constitution", "Government" and "Jurisprudence" and secondly an alphabetical list with explanatory notes and references.

On 11 July 1800, the report was read a second time and the House of Commons resolved to present a humble address to King George III to execute the report's recommendations. A Committee was appointed to draw up the address, consisting of Charles Abbot, Lord Viscount Belgrave, William Douglas, Charles Yorke, Charles Perceval, 2nd Baron Arden, John Smyth, John Eliot, George Rose, Sir John William Anderson, William Baker (1743–1824), George Manners-Sutton and Charles Bragge, which was reported and agreed to by the House of Commons the same day. The Commons reported that while some public records were well preserved and organised, many important records were poorly arranged, undescribed, exposed to erasure, alteration or embezzlement, stored in damp conditions and at risk of fire. The address noted that it was approximately 70 years since the last parliamentary inquiry on the subject, during which changes in language and the increased complexity of proceedings had made it more difficult to organise and use records effectively. The Commons requested the Sovereign to issue directions for better preservation and organisation of public records and approve extraordinary expenses necessary for the undertaking. The address was confirmed as being presented to His Majesty on 17 July 1800.

On 28 July 1800, the House of Commons resolved to pay Charles Abbot £1,000 (equivalent to £72,421 in 2025) to cover staff and business expenses This resolution was presented to His Majesty on 29 July 1800.

== Legacy ==
=== Re-publication ===
On 9 March 1801, the House of Lords requested a copy of the report from House of Commons, which was received on 10 March, agreed to on 11 March 1801, and ordered to be printed on 13 March 1801.

=== Record Commission ===
Following the report of the committee and humble address to the Sovereign from the House of Commons, the first Record Commission was established on 19 July 1800. Successive commissions were issued in 1806, 1817, 1821, 1825, 1831 and 1837.

In 1806, the Commission on Public Records passed a resolution requesting the production of a report on the best mode of reducing the volume of the statute book. At their first sitting, the commissioners resolved "That a complete, and authentic collection of the Statutes of the realm be prepared, including every law, as well those repealed or expired as those now in force, with a chronological list of them, and tables of their principal matters". From 1810 to 1825, The Statutes of the Realm was published, providing for the first time the authoritative collection of acts.
