= Book of Plays =

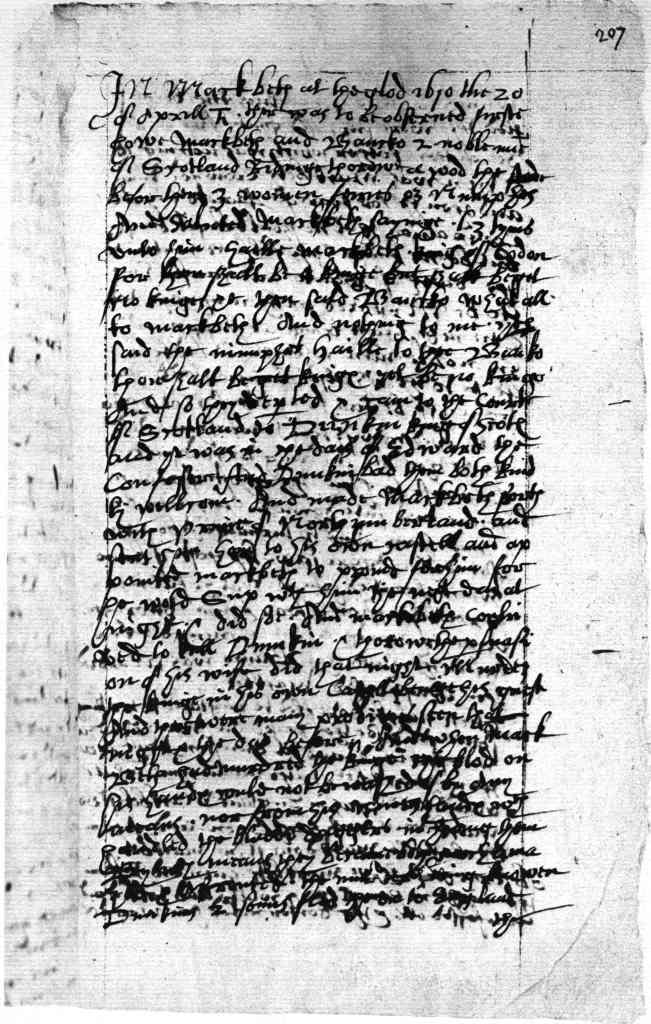
Simon Forman's description of a production of Macbeth at the Globe Theatre, 20 April 1610. Oxford, Bodleian Library, MS. Ashmole 208, f. 207r.

The Book of Plays (full title in original spelling The Bocke of Plaies and Notes therof p formans for Common Pollicie) is a section of a manuscript by the London astrologer Simon Forman that records his descriptions of four plays he attended in 1610-11 and the morals he drew from them. It is now in the Bodleian Library catalogued as MS Ashmole 208. The document is noteworthy for being the only preserved eyewitness accounts of Shakespeare’s plays on the professional stage during his lifetime: Macbeth at the Globe Theatre on 20 April 1610; The Winter's Tale at the Globe on 15 May 1611; and Cymbeline, date and theatre not specified.

The fourth play described by Forman is a Richard II acted at the Globe on 30 April 1611; but from its description it covered the king’s earlier reign, and so was not Shakespeare's Richard II, first published 14 years earlier.

The notes were discovered in Forman’s extensive papers in or before 1832 by Philip Bliss or William H. Black. Joseph Hunter mentioned that Bliss had drawn his attention to them in the summer of 1832, and Black noted them on a proof-sheet of his catalogue of the Ashmole manuscripts.

== Suspicions of forgery ==
The description of MacBeth mentions characters "Ridinge", a detail that critics with a knowledge of Jacobean dramaturgy and stagecraft had found startling, although subsequent scholars, commenting on a horse evidently present on stage in another play, have opined that it is within the realm of possibility. Also the idea that Forman, a worldly-wise and canny operator, would spend his time drawing sententious morals from the stage plays he saw struck some modern critics as psychologically false, and in the 20th century suspicion emerged that the Book of Plays was one of John Payne Collier's forgeries, although Collier, who announced his discovery of the document in 1836, claimed to have used a transcription made for him by an unnamed "gentleman" (identified in 1841 by James Halliwell as William H. Black, who catalogued the Ashmolean Collection).

In 1933 Samuel A. Tannenbaum published an elaborate case arguing that the section was a forgery. Much of Tannenbaum's case centered on palaeographic arguments about the manuscript's handwriting. An earlier examiner of the manuscript had transcribed the section title as "A Book of Places", and Tannenbaum theorised that the section originally contained descriptions of places in England that Forman had visited and that Collier had altered the title and either inserted forged leaves or had chemically removed the ink for his forgeries. However, subsequent scholars examined the leaves under ultraviolet light and found no trace of forgery or rebinding. In 1945, W. W. Greg criticised Tannenbaum's scholarship and J. Dover Wilson and R. W. Hunt both examined the manuscript without finding any evidence of tampering. It was also learned that Tannenbaum, who had not examined the manuscript but relied instead on photostats, had compared the section with writing Forman had done ten years earlier instead of using a control from the same period. Finally, the record Halliwell had found identifying Black as the librarian that had made a transcript of the Forman manuscript for Collier in 1832 was rediscovered, confirming that Collier never had access to the manuscript. Most modern scholars accept the section as authentic, but some still suspect it might be a forgery. Katherine Duncan-Jones, for example, did not use it as a source for her biography of Shakespeare, finding it "strangely suspicious that Forman, who nowhere else in his copious papers reveals any interest in the theatre, should suddenly have taken to playgoing in the last year of his life", apparently unaware that Forman does reveal an interest in theatre elsewhere in the manuscripts.
