= Record Commission =

British Royal Commissions, 1800–1837

The Record Commissions were a series of six royal commissions of Great Britain and (from 1801) the United Kingdom which sat between 1800 and 1837 to inquire into the custody and public accessibility of the state archives. The commissioners' work paved the way for the establishment of the Public Record Office in 1838. The commissioners were also responsible for publishing various historical records, including the Statutes of the Realm (i.e. of England and Great Britain) to 1714 and the Acts of Parliament of Scotland to 1707, as well as a number of important medieval records.

Although the six commissions were technically distinct from one another, there was a considerable degree of continuity between them, and it is common practice to regard them as a single entity and to refer to them in singular form as the Record Commission.

== Background ==
Public record keeping had a long tradition in the United Kingdom, the requirement for accessibility to the public present in some of the earliest Rolls of Parliament. Queen Elizabeth I instituted an inquiry into the parliamentary, chancery and exchequer rolls and sought the recovery of dispersed charters, and King James I established a State Paper Office and Office of General Remembrance of Matters of Record.

In 1604, the House of Commons moved for a special record repository and in 1620 the House of Lords appointed a committee to search for records. Soon after, King Charles I established a commission for searching after all records belonging to the crown. These efforts were thwarted by the English Civil War, although during the Restoration King Charles II established the Office for State Papers and reformed the Treasuries of the Common Courts.

Queen Anne authorised the publication of the Compilation of State Papers and Records, also known as Rymer's Foedera, published in 20 volumes between 1704 and 1735, as well the Inquiry into the State of our Domestic Records, led by Lord Halifax and Lord Somers. In 1704, the Lords referred the question of the nature and condition of parliamentary records to a committee, which led to improvements in the storage of records, especially in the Jewel Tower of the Palace of Westminster. In April 1725, the House of Lords appointed a committee to view the parliamentary records and inspect others lying in disorder in the palace.

Following the 1731 fire at the Cotton library, the House of Commons instigated an inquiry into public record keeping. The committee received 18 returns from repositories, leading to the publication of the Table of the Records of the Kingdom on 9 May 1732.

In 1772, the House of Commons appointed a committee to investigate the state of records in the Rolls Chapel, which found that records were damaged by age, damp, heat and transportation. The work of the committee led to the establishment of clerk of the Rolls Chapel records in 1784.

By 1800, it was widely recognised that public record keeping was poor, with records disparate, undescribed and kept in bad conditions. It had been 70-years since any parliamentary proceedings on public record keeping, during which time the volume of records had greatly increased. Furthermore, no parliamentary inquiry had extended to courts (maritime or ecclesiastical), cathedrals, universities, bespoke collections (including the Royal, Slonian and Harleian collections), the British Museum or any public repositories in Scotland.

The Parliament of the United Kingdom, formed in 1800, following the Acts of Union 1800 devoted much attention to the consolidation of public records. On 18 February 1800, the Select Committee on the State of Public Records was appointed to inquire into the state of public records in England, Scotland and Ireland.

The committee reported on 4 July 1800. On 11 July 1800, the report was read a second time and the House of Commons resolved to present a humble address to King George III to execute the report's recommendations. A committee was appointed to draw up the address, consisting of Charles Abbot, Lord Viscount Belgrave, William Douglas, Charles Yorke, Charles Perceval, 2nd Baron Arden, John Smyth, John Eliot, George Rose, Sir John William Anderson, William Baker (1743–1824), George Manners-Sutton and Charles Bragge, which was reported and agreed to by the House of Commons the same day. The Commons reported that while some public records were well preserved and organised, many important records were poorly arranged, undescribed, exposed to erasure, alteration or embezzlement, stored in damp conditions and at risk of fire. The address noted that it was approximately 70 years since the last parliamentary inquiry on the subject, during which changes in language and the increased complexity of proceedings had made it more difficult to organise and use records effectively. The Commons requested the Sovereign to issue directions for better preservation and organisation of public records and approve extraordinary expenses necessary for the undertaking. The address was confirmed as being presented to His Majesty on 17 July 1800.

Following the report of the committee and humble address to the Sovereign from the House of Commons, the first Record Commission was established.

== Activities ==
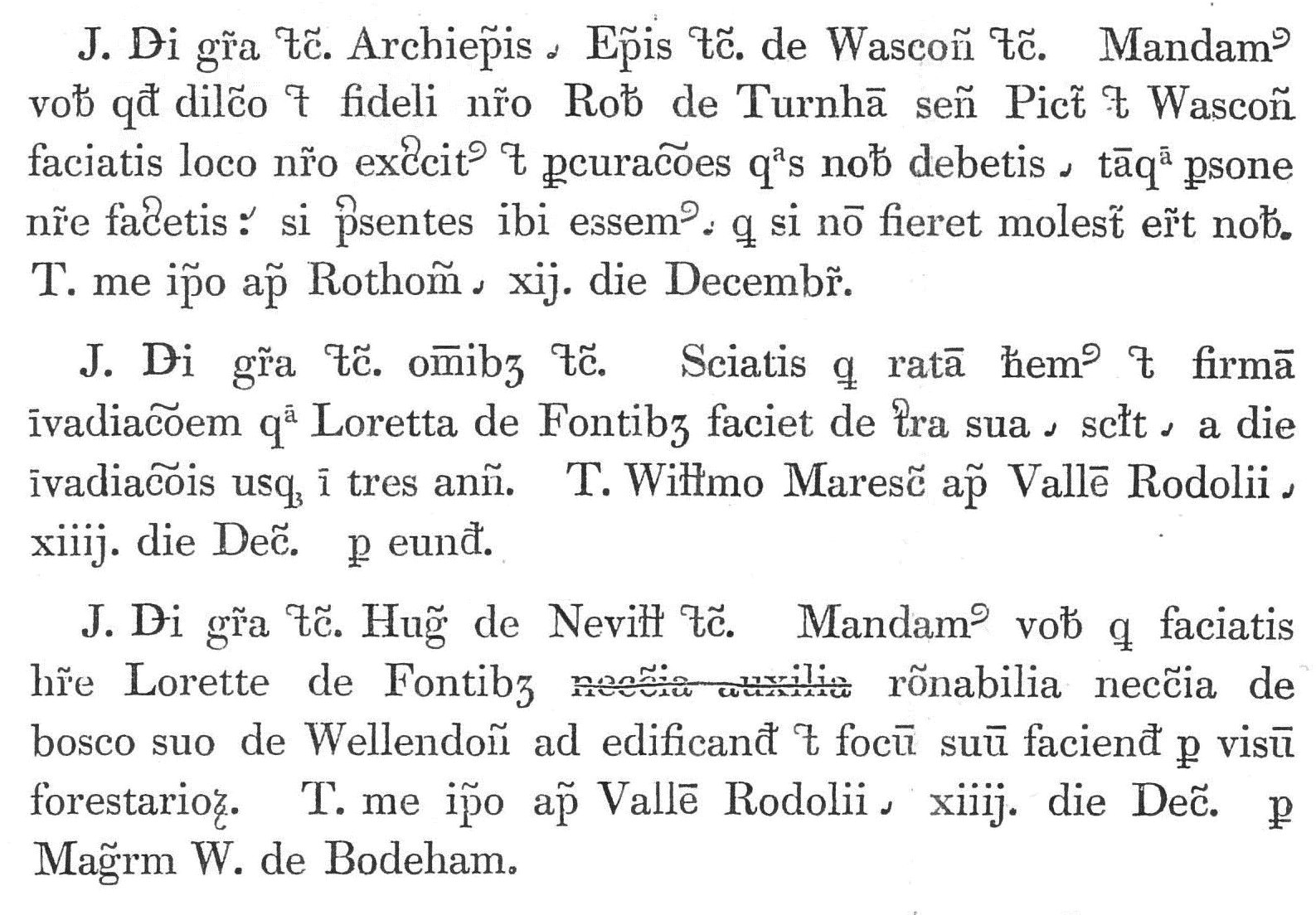
Extract from the Patent Roll for 3 John (1201–2), as published by the Record Commission in 1835 using record type

The first commission was established on 19 July 1800, on the recommendation of the Select Committee on the State of Public Records appointed earlier in the year, on the initiative and under the chairmanship of Charles Abbot, MP for Helston, "to inquire into the State of the Public Records of this kingdom". The public records were at this time housed in a variety of repositories, including the Tower of London, the chapter house of Westminster Abbey, the Pell Office adjacent to Westminster Hall, Somerset House, and elsewhere, often in a disorganised state and in highly unsuitable physical conditions. The idea of a single central repository was mooted as early as 1800, and became the subject of an abortive parliamentary bill in 1833, but it was to be some years before this was achieved: in the meantime, the commissioners arranged for various moves of individual classes of records into new accommodation. These moves were well-intentioned and sometimes led to improvements in storage and arrangement, but more often resulted in the loss and further disorganisation of records.

The commission (in particular the sixth commission, which sat from 1831 to 1837) gained a reputation for inactivity, corruption, jobbery, and for including among its members too many persons in high office with other demands on their time. Some of these criticisms came from external observers, such as Sir Harris Nicolas; others were made by the commission's own salaried employees, notably Henry Cole, and to a lesser extent Thomas Duffus Hardy. A parliamentary committee, appointed to inquire into its work, reported in 1836 that the national archives remained scattered in a number of unsuitable locations, and in the custody of "a multitude of imperfectly responsible keepers". Out of these controversies emerged the Public Record Office Act 1838, which established the Public Record Office in that same year.

The commissioners' second objective was to make the records more accessible through the compilation of finding aids (indexes and calendars), and where possible the publication of these, as well as the publication of full texts of selected records of particular importance. The sixth commission employed four sub-commissioners (Joseph Hunter, Francis Palgrave, Joseph Stevenson, and for a time John Caley), as well as other ad hoc editors and a number of clerks, specifically on the task of editing records for publication. Most of the commission's publications used a "record type" typeface, designed to present the text in a near-facsimile of the manuscript originals. The publications programme was generally considered a success, and many of the commission's editions remain in current scholarly use. In other cases, however, the absence of a permanent arrangement to the records rapidly rendered the compilation of finding aids redundant.

== Publications ==
The commissions' publications included:

- Astle, Thomas; Ayscough, Samuel; Caley, John, eds. (1802). Taxatio Ecclesiastica Angliae et Walliae auctoritate P. Nicholai IV, circa A.D. 1291.
- Astle, Thomas; Ayscough, Samuel; Caley, John, eds. (1802). Calendarium Rotulorum Patentium in Turri Londiniensi. See Patent Rolls.
- Caley, John, ed. (1803). Calendarium Rotulorum Chartarum et Inquisitionum ad quod damnum. See Charter Roll.
- Robertson, W., ed. (1804). The Parliamentary Records of Scotland in the General Register House, Edinburgh.
- Playford, H.; Caley, John, eds. (1805–1810). Rotulorum Originalium in Curia Scaccarii Abbreviato. (2 vols)
- Caley, John; Bayley, J., eds. (1806–28). Calendarium Inquisitionum post mortem sive Escaetarum. (4 vols). See Inquisition post mortem.
- Vanderzee, G., ed. (1807). Nonarum Inquisitiones in Curia Scaccarii, temp. Regis Edwardi III.
- Caley, John; Illingworth, William, eds. (1807). Testa de Nevill sive liber feodorum in Curia Scaccarii, temp Hen. III et Edw. I. See Book of Fees.
- Luders, A.; Tomlins, T. E.; Taunton, W. E.; Raithby, J., eds. (1810–28). The Statutes of the Realm, from original records and authentic manuscripts. (11 vols). See The Statutes of the Realm.
- Caley, John; Hunter, J., eds. (1810–34). Valor Ecclesiasticus temp. Hen. VIII auctoritate regia institutus. (6 vols)
- Illingworth, William, ed. (1811). Placitorum in Domo Capitulari Westmonasteriensi asservatorum abbreviatio, temporibus regum Ric. I, Johann., Hen. III, Edw. I, Edw. II.
- Thomson, Thomas, ed. (1811–16). Inquistitionum ad Capellam Domini Regis retornatarum quae in publicis archivis Scotiae adhuc servantur, abbreviatio. (3 vols)
- Illingworth, William, ed. (1812–18). Rotuli Hundredorum temp. Hen. III et Edw. I in turr' Lond' et in curia receptae scaccarii West' asservati. (2 vols). See Hundred Rolls.
- Macpherson, David; Caley, John; Illingworth, William, eds. (1814–19). Rotuli Scotiae in Turri Londinensi et in Domo Capitulari Westmonasteriensi asservati. (2 vols)
- Thomson, Thomas; Innes, Cosmo, eds. (1814–44). The Acts of Parliament of Scotland. (11 vols)
- Ellis, Henry, ed. (1816). Libri Censualis, vocati Domesday-Book, additamenta ex codic. antiquiss.: Exon' Domesday, Inquisition Eliensis, Liber Winton', Boldon Book. (An edition of four 11th and 12th-century regional surveys associated with Domesday Book. See Publication of Domesday Book.)
- Ellis, Henry, ed. (1816). Libri Censualis, vocati Domesday-Book, Indices: accesit dissertatio generalis de ratione hujusce libri. (A set of indexes to the edition of Domesday Book edited by Abraham Farley and published by the government in 1783. See Publication of Domesday Book.)
- Illingworth, William, ed. (1818). Placita de Quo Warranto, temporibus Edw. I, II et III in Curia Receptae Scaccarii Westm. Asservata.
- Harper, R. J.; Caley, John; Minchin, W., eds. (1823–34). Ducatus Lancastriae. (Records of inquisitions post mortem, and pleadings and depositions, within the Duchy of Lancaster, in 3 vols)
- Bayley, John, ed. (1827–32). Calendars of the Proceedings in Chancery in the Reign of Queen Elizabeth; to which are prefixed examples of earlier proceedings in that court, namely, from the reign of Richard the Second to that of Queen Elizabeth inclusive. (3 vols)
- Palgrave, Francis, ed. (1827–34). The Parliamentary Writs and Writs of Military Summons, together with the records and muniments relating to the suit and service due and performed to the King's High Court of Parliament and the Councils of the Realm, or affording evidence of attendance at Parliaments and Councils. (2 vols: includes in Vol. 2 a text of Nomina Villarum)
- Hunter, Joseph, ed. (1833). Magnum Rotulum Scaccarii, vel Magnum Rotulum Pipae, anno tricesimo-primo regni Henrici primi, ut videtur, quem plurimi hactenus laudarunt pro rotulo quinti anni Stephani Regis.
- Hunter, Joseph, ed. (1833). Rotulus Cancellarii, vel Antigraphum Magni Rotuli Pipae, de tertio anno regni Regis Johannis.
- Hardy, Thomas Duffus, ed. (1833). Rotuli Litteraum Clausarum in Turri Londinensi Asservati. (An edition of the Close Rolls for the years 1204–1224. A second volume, covering the years 1224–27 and also edited by Hardy, was published by the Public Record Office in 1844.)
- Hunter, Joseph, ed. (1834). Rotuli Selecti ad res Anglicas et Hibernicas Spectantes: ex Archivis in Domo Capitulari Westmonasteriensi Deprompti.
- Nicolas, Sir Harris, ed. (1834–37). Proceedings and Ordinances of the Privy Council of England (1386–1542). (7 vols)
- Palgrave, Francis, ed. (1835). Rotuli Curiae Regis: Rolls and Records of the Court held before the King's Justiciars or Justices. (2 vols)
- Hardy, Thomas Duffus, ed. (1835). Rotuli Litterarum Patentium in Turri Londonensi Asservati: Vol. I, part I. (An edition of the Patent Rolls from 1201 to 1216.)
- Hardy, Thomas Duffus, ed. (1835). Rotuli Normanniae in Turri Londinensi Asservati, Johanne et Henrico Quinto Angliae Regibus: Vol. II: De annis 1200–1205, necnon de anno 1417.
- Hardy, Thomas Duffus, ed. (1835). Rotuli de Oblatis et Finibus in Turri Londinensi Asservati, tempore Regis Johannis. (An edition of the Fine rolls to 1216.)
- Cole, Henry, ed. (1835). Catalogue of Records remaining in the Office of the King's Remembrancer of the Exchequer.
- Roberts, Charles, ed. (1835–36). Excerpta e Rotulis Finium in Turri Londinensi Asservatis, Henrico Tertio Rege, A.D. 1216–1272. Printed by G. Eyre & A . Spottiswoode]. (2 vols) (A selective edition of excerpts from the Fine rolls of the reign of Henry III.)
- Hunter, Joseph, ed. (1835). Fines sive Pedes Finium sive Finales Concordiae in Curia Domini Regis, ab Anno Septimo Regni Regis Ricardi I ad Annum Decimum Sextum Regis Johannis, A.D. 1195–A.D. 1214. (An edition of feet of fines for the counties of Bedfordshire, Berkshire, Buckinghamshire, Cambridgeshire and Cornwall to 1214. A second volume, covering the counties of Cumberland, Derbyshire, Devon and Dorset was published by the Public Record Office in 1844.)
- Palgrave, Francis, ed. (1836). The Ancient Kalendars and Inventories of the Treasury of His Majesty's Exchequer, together with other documents illustrating the history of that repository. (3 vols)
- Hardy, Thomas Duffus, ed. (1838). Rotuli Chartarum in Turri Londinensi Asservati: Vol. I, part I: Ab anno MCXCIX ad annum MCCXVI. (An edition of the Charter Rolls from 1199 to 1216.)
- Black, W. H., ed. (1837). Docquets of Letters Patent and other instruments passed under the Great Seal of King Charles I in the years 1642, 1643, 1644, 1645 and 1646.
- Ellis, Henry, ed. (1838). Registrum vulgariter nuncupatum "The Record of Caernarvon": a codice Msto Harleiano 696 descriptum. (An edition of manorial extents in Caernarvon and Anglesey, mainly of 1352–53, with other related records)

== See also ==
- Royal Commission on Historical Manuscripts

== Bibliography ==
- Cantwell, John (1984). "The 1838 Public Record Office Act and its aftermath: a new perspective". Journal of the Society of Archivists. 7 (5): 277–86. doi:10.1080/00379818409514241.
- Cappon, Lester J. (1972). "Antecedents of the Rolls Series: Issues in Historical Editing". Journal of the Society of Archivists. 4 (5): 358–69. doi:10.1080/00379817209513979.
- Gouldesbrough, Peter (1973). "The Record Commissions and Scotland". In Ranger, Felicity (ed.). Prisca Munimenta: studies in archival & administrative history presented to Dr A.E.J. Hollaender. London: University of London Press. pp. 19–26. ISBN 978-0-340-17398-5.
- Walne, Peter (1973). "The Record Commissions 1800–37". In Ranger, Felicity (ed.). Prisca Munimenta: studies in archival & administrative history presented to Dr A.E.J. Hollaender. London: University of London Press. pp. 9–18. ISBN 978-0-340-17398-5.
