= Thomas Astle =

English antiquary and palaeographer (1735–1803)

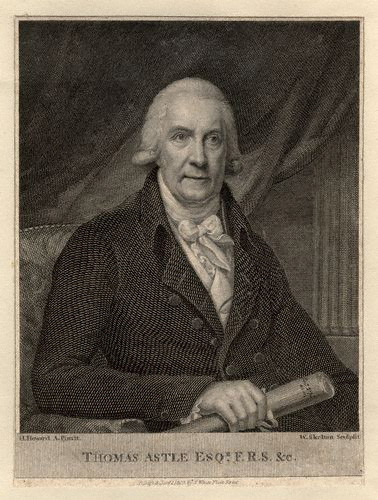
Thomas Astle

Thomas Astle FRS FRSE FSA (22 December 1735 – 1 December 1803) was an English antiquary and palaeographer. He became a fellow of the Society of Antiquaries and the Royal Society.

== Life ==
Astle was born on 22 December 1735 at Yoxall on the borders of Needwood Forest in Staffordshire, the son of Daniel Astle, keeper of the forest. He was articled to an attorney, but did not take up his profession and went to London, where he was employed to make an index to the catalogue of the Harleian manuscripts, printed in 1759, 2 vols, folio.

Astle was elected a fellow of the Society of Antiquaries of London in 1763, and about the same time George Grenville employed him in arranging papers and other matters that required a knowledge of ancient handwriting, and nominated him, with Sir Joseph Ayloffe and Andrew Coltée Ducarel, as members of a commission to superintend the regulation of the public records at Westminster. On the death of his two colleagues, John Topham was substituted; he and Astle were removed under Pitt's administration. The same persons were appointed by royal commission in 1764 to superintend the methodising of the records of state and council preserved in the State Paper Office at Whitehall. In 1765 Astle was made receiver-general of sixpence in the pound on the civil list, and on 18 December of the same year he married Anna Maria, the only daughter and heiress of the Rev. Philip Morant, the historian of Essex.

In 1766 Astle was admitted a Fellow of the Royal Society. He was nominated "as a Gentleman greatly Conversant in the study of the Antiquities of this kingdom" by Charles Lyttelton, Bishop of Carlisle, Ayloffe, Ducarel, Charles Lloyd, Gowin Knight, Matthew Maty, Peter Collinson, Owen Salusbury Brereton and Henry Baker. In the same year, Astle was consulted by a committee of the House of Lords on the subject of printing the ancient records of Parliament. He suggested employing his father-in-law in this work, and succeeded him on his death in 1770. After the death in 1775 of Henry Rooke, chief clerk of the Record Office in the Tower, Astle was appointed to his place; and on the decease of Sir John Shelley, Keeper of the Records, in 1783, obtained the higher office.

On the death of Morant in 1770 he came into possession through his wife of his father-in-law's library of books and manuscripts, and of a considerable fortune. He died of dropsy at his house at Battersea Rise, near London on 1 December 1803, in his 69th year. By his wife he had nine children. His children included Philip Hills, Edward Astle, Maria Bloxham and Rear-Admiral George Astle.

Thomas Astle is buried in St Mary's Church, Battersea, which has a monument to him designed by the London sculptor Charles Regnart.

== Collections and works ==
Astle eventually brought together the most remarkable private collection of manuscripts in the country. Thomas Percy acknowledges his help while investigating ballad literature. He was a conductor of The Antiquarian Repertory, and contributed to the Archaeologia and Vetusta Monumenta of the Society of Antiquaries. In the latter appeared his contribution on unpublished Scottish seals. The editorship of the Taxatio Ecclesiastica and the Calendarium Rotulorum Patentium (Record Commission, 1802, 2 vols, folio), has been ascribed in error to Astle; John Caley edited the former work, and Caley with Samuel Ayscough the latter one.

His printed books, chiefly collected by Morant, were purchased from his executors in 1804 for the sum of £1,000, by the founders of the Royal Institution. The collection of manuscripts was left by will to the Marquis of Buckingham, in token of the testator's regard for the Grenville family, on payment of a nominal sum of £500. The marquis caused a room to be erected by John Soane for their reception at Stowe.

Astle was an efficient and zealous keeper, working on storage and indexation. A Catalogue of the MSS. in the Cottonian Library... with an account of the damage sustained by fire in 1731 and a catalogue of the charters preserved was published by Samuel Hooper in 1777, with a dedication to Astle. He had no literary connection with the Will of King Alfred (1788), often said to have been translated by him. Sir Herbert Croft was the editor of this; the translation and most of the notes were furnished by the Rev. Owen Manning. Besides many contributions to the Archaeologia between 1763 and 1802, Astle published the following:

- The Will of King Henry VII, London, 1775, 4to.
- The Origin and Progress of Writing, as well Hieroglyphic as Elementary, illustrated by engravings taken from marbles, manuscripts, and charters, ancient and modern: also some account of the origin and progress of printing, London, 1784, 4to, with 31 plates; the 'second edition, with additions,' London, 1803, 4to, 32 plates and portrait, contains Appendix on the Radical Letters of the Pelasgians (published separately in 1775)
- An Account of the Seals of the Kings, Royal Boroughs, and Magnates of Scotland, London, 1792, folio, 5 plates; also published in Vetusta Monumenta, 1796, iii.

Astle's chief work, The Origin and Progress of Writing, was a contribution to the English literature of palaeography, intended to be a work of diplomatics. The plates were engraved by Benjamin Thomas Pouncey. The preparation of the text and notes of the edition of the Rotuli Parliamentorum ut et petitiones et placita in Parliamento, etc. [1278–1503], London, 1767–77, 6 vols, folio, was undertaken by Morant and John Topham down to 2nd Henry VI, and after that period by Topham and Astle. Dr. John Strachey saw the volumes through the press. The Will of Henry VII was reproduced by Astle in 1775 from the original in the chapter house at Westminster.

== Sources ==
- Ramsay, Nigel (2009) [2004]. "Astle, Thomas (1735–1803)". Oxford Dictionary of National Biography (online ed.). Oxford University Press. doi:10.1093/ref:odnb/816. (Subscription, Wikipedia Library access or UK public library membership required.)
- Sweet, Rosemary (2004). Antiquaries: the discovery of the past in eighteenth-century Britain. London: Hambledon & London. ISBN 1-85285-309-3.

This article incorporates text from a publication now in the public domain: Tedder, Henry Richard (1885). "Astle, Thomas". Dictionary of National Biography. Vol. 02. pp. 203–205.
