= Benjamin Thomas Pouncy =

British draughtsman and engraver (d. 1799)

Benjamin Thomas Pouncy (died 1799) was an English draughtsman and engraver.

== Life ==
He was the son of Edward Pouncy, born around 1750, and the family background was in Kent. He was a pupil of William Woollett, stated to have been his brother-in-law by the Gentleman's Magazine. He obtained employment through Lambeth Palace, and from the 1770s assisted Andrew Ducarel in his researches with illustrations.

A fellow of the Incorporated Society of Artists, Pouncy exhibited topographical views with them in 1772 and 1773; he also sent such works to the Royal Academy in 1782, 1788, and 1789. He died in Pratt Street, Lambeth, on 22 August 1799, and was buried in the graveyard of the parish church.

== Works ==
Pouncy executed facsimiles of the Domesday surveys for Surrey and Worcestershire. He engraved the plates for antiquarian and topographical works, including:

- Andrew Ducarel's History of St. Katherine's Hospital, 1782;
- Thomas Astle's Origin and Progress of Writing, 1784;
- Some Account of the Alien Priories, edited by John Nichols, 1779; and
- John Ives, Remarks upon the Garianonum of the Romans, 1774.

In later life, Pouncy produced plates of landscape and marine subjects after popular artists, such as:

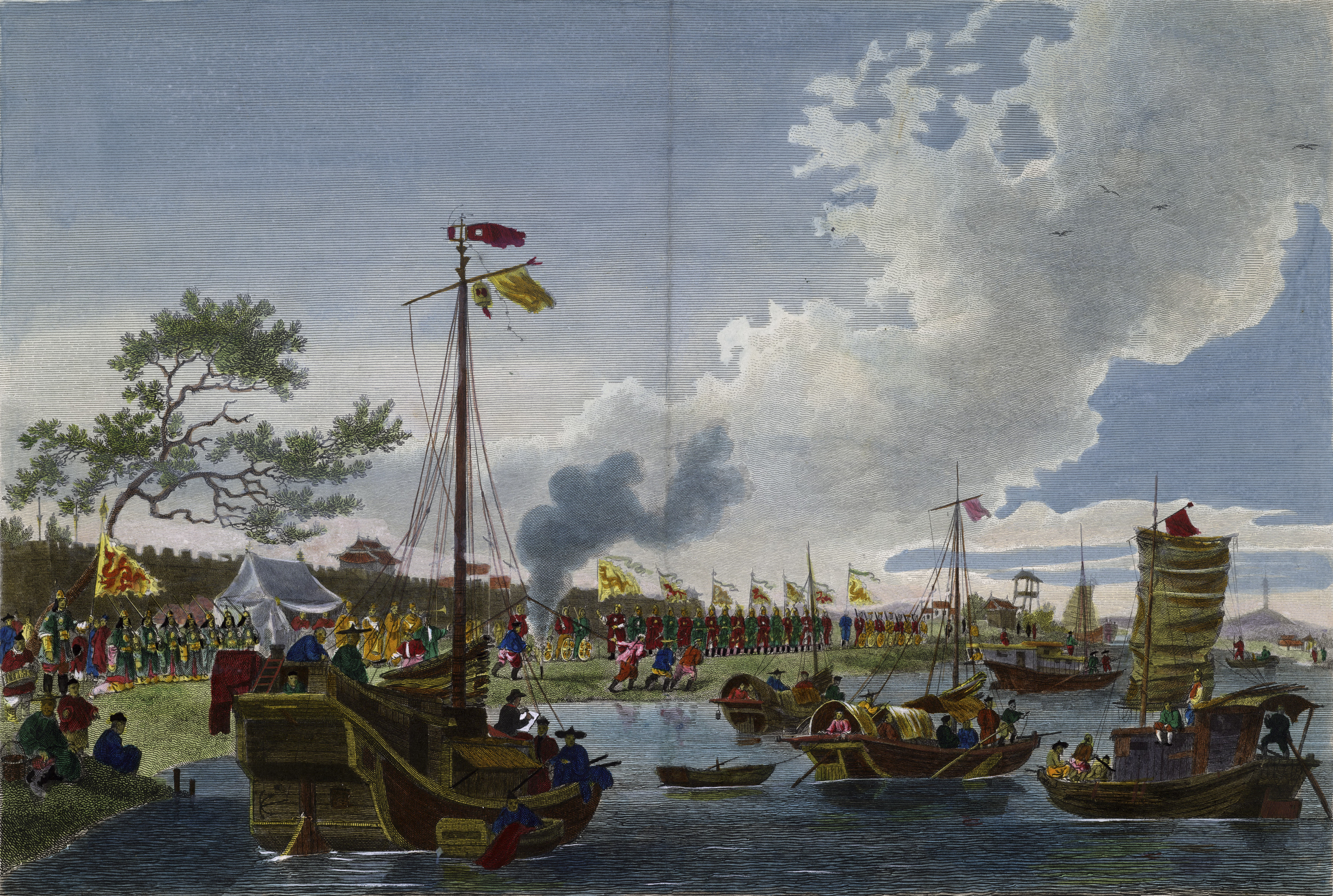
Chinese military drawn out in compliment to the British Embassador (1796), scene of the Macartney Embassy, engraved by Benjamin Thomas Pouncy after William Alexander

- Athens in its Flourishing State, after Richard Wilson, and Athens in its Present State of Ruin, after Solomon Delane (a pair);
- Sortie made by the Garrison of Gibraltar on 27 Nov. 1781, after Antonio Poggi;
- The building, chase, unlading, and dissolution of a cutter (a set of four), after John Kitchingman, 1783 and 1785;
- N.W. View of Rochester, after Joseph Farington, 1790;
- The Morning of the Glorious First of June 1794, after Robert Cleveley, 1796;
- The Windmill and The Watermill, from his own drawings, 1787; and
- Four landscapes after J. Hearne.

Pouncy also executed many of the plates for Captain Cook's second and third Voyages, after William Hodges and John Webber, 1777 and 1784; George Staunton's Embassy of Lord Macartney to China, 1797; Farington's Views of the Lakes in Cumberland and Westmorland, 1789; Robert Bowyer's History of England, Thomas Macklin's Bible, and the Copperplate Magazine.

Woollett engraved The Grotto at Amwell, from a drawing by Pouncy, as an illustration to John Scott of Amwell's Poems, 1782.
