= Sylvester Joseph Hunter =

English Jesuit and educator

Sylvester Joseph Hunter was an English Jesuit, lawyer and educator. He was born in Bath, 13 September 1829, and was raised as a Unitarian. He was baptized firstly at Trim Street Chapel, Bath, 23 December 1829; and then as an Anglican at Christ Church, Albany Street. He later was a convert to Catholicism and joined the Jesuit Order. He died at Stonyhurst on 20 June 1896 and was buried two days later.

== Life ==
His father, Joseph Hunter, was a Unitarian minister who was better known as an antiquarian writer and Shakespeare critic. In 1833 Joseph Hunter moved with his family from Bath to London to assume the function of Deputy Keeper of the Public Records, and in 1840 Sylvester Joseph Hunter entered St. Paul's School.

He received a scholarship at Trinity College, Cambridge and entered the university in 1848. Graduating B.A. in 1852, he was placed eighth wrangler in the Mathematical Tripos for that year. Soon after this he entered Lincoln's Inn, London, as a law student. “At the late examination of candidates, on being called to the bar, the prize scholarship of fifty guineas a year was awarded to Mr Sylvester Hunter, of Lincoln's Inn, youngest son of the Rev. Jos. Hunter, the historian of Hallamshire”.

In 1857 he was received into the Catholic Church by Canon Frederick Oakeley. Within eight years of his graduation at Cambridge he had published two legal text-books, The Suit in Equity and The Law of Trusteeships, which immediately attracted attention. His prospects at the chancery Bar were already assured when, in 1861, he decided to try his religious vocation in the Society of Jesus.

In 1861 he entered the English Novitiate; he there passed through the regular biennium of probation, attended lectures in philosophy at Stonyhurst Saint Mary's Hall, for one year, taught for two years at Stonyhurst College, and thence passed on to his theological studies at St. Beuno's College, where he was ordained priest in 1870.

He began to teach the higher classes at Stonyhurst. The University of London physics and mathematics requirements at that time were an obstacle to Stonyhurst boys whose time had been almost monopolized by their Latin and Greek studies. Hunter's efforts to deal with this situation resulted in an increased number of Stonyhurst students mentioned in the London Honours List, as well as in two books which he compiled to assist others in the same branch of teaching.

His influence was widened when, in 1875, he took up the training of Jesuit scholastics who were to teach in the colleges of the English Province. It was after ten years of this work that he was appointed rector of St. Beuno's, where he wrote the Outlines of Dogmatic Theology. Other spare moments were given to conducting the "Cases of Conscience" for the Diocese of Salford. He spent the last five years of his life at Stonyhurst where he began writing Short History of England but died before completing it.

The death, which has just occurred at Stonyhurst College, of the Rev Sylvester Hunter, SJ, places that institution in mourning for the second time within a week. The deceased, who was one of the most eminent theologians of the Jesuit body, and the author of many learned works, was educated at the University of Cambridge, where he took high honours, and became Wrangler. He afterwards entered the legal profession, and practiced successfully for some years. Upon becoming a convert to Roman Catholicism he joined the Jesuit Order, and after his ordination was appointed Professor of Rhetoric at Roehampton, and subsequently Rector of St Beuno’s College in Wales. Father Hunter at the time of his death was engaged in lecturing on law to the students preparing for that profession at Stonyhurst. He was in the sixty-seventh year of his age.

== Works ==
A list of Hunter's publications can be found at "Books by Sylvester Joseph Hunter". Better World Books.
