= Henry Ellis (librarian) =

English librarian and antiquarian

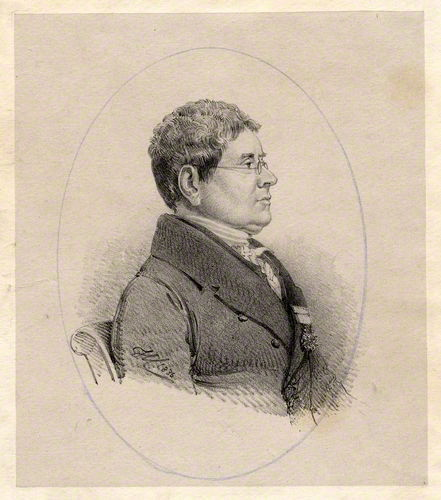
Sir Henry Ellis, 1836 lithograph by Henry Corbould.

Sir Henry Ellis KH FRS FSA (29 November 1777 – 15 January 1869) was an English librarian and antiquarian, for a long period principal librarian at the British Museum.

== Early years ==
Born in London, Henry Ellis was educated at the Mercers' School, and at Merchant Taylors' School, where his brother, the Rev. John Joseph Ellis, was assistant-master for forty years. Having gained one of the Merchant Taylors' exhibitions at St John's College, Oxford, he matriculated in 1796.

== Librarian ==
In 1798, through his friend John Price, Ellis was appointed one of the two assistants in the Bodleian Library, the other being his future colleague in the British Museum Henry Hervey Baber. He took the degree of B.C.L. in 1802. He was a Fellow of St John's till 1805. In 1800 he was appointed a temporary assistant in the library of the British Museum, and in 1805 he became assistant-keeper of printed books under William Beloe. The theft of prints which cost Beloe his appointment in the following year raised Ellis to the headship of the department, and Baber became his assistant.

Ellis's promotion coincided with a period of increased activity at the museum. The printed catalogue of the library was at that time comprised in two folio volumes, full of inaccuracies, but provided with a manuscript supplement, and to a considerable extent revised and corrected in manuscript by Beloe's predecessor Samuel Harper. Ellis and Baber commenced their work of reconstruction in March 1807, and completed it in December 1819. Ellis had meanwhile been moved to the manuscripts department (1812), accepted (1814) the then almost sinecure office of secretary to the museum, and in the same year became secretary to the Society of Antiquaries of London. During the forty years for which he held the post, he only missed two meetings. He was elected a Fellow of the Royal Society in May 1811.

In 1827 Joseph Planta, the principal librarian, died, and Ellis, who had for nine years taken on much of his duties, expected to succeed him. When two names for the vacancy were submitted to the Crown, Henry Fynes Clinton, a protégé of Archbishop Charles Manners-Sutton, was placed before Ellis. Ellis intrigued successfully for the post, it is said by pursuing the carriage of the royal physician, Sir William Knighton, and enlisting his good offices with the king. He was appointed on 20 December 1827. In 1832 he was made a Knight of Hanover, an honour which he shared with John Herschel, Frederic Madden, and others; and he was knighted in 1833.

== In the face of reform ==
The museum was at a low ebb in the 1830s. William Cobbett campaigned against it, and Benjamin Hawes used a complaint from an ex-employee as a pretext to set up a parliamentary enquiry.

Ellis told the parliamentary committee of 1835 that if the museum were not closed for three weeks in the autumn, "the place would positively become unwholesome", and that it would never do to open it on Saturdays, when "the most mischievous part of the population was abroad". The committee's conclusions were enough to force the trustees to change management practices. They devolved the heaviest of the principal librarian's duties on the secretary, who became the most important officer in the museum.

Josiah Forshall took on the position of secretary in 1837, who took control, with Madden and Anthony Panizzi under him. Ellis, though seemingly unconscious of any change in his position, was virtually superseded as chief officer; and when the committee of 1848–9 united the offices of secretary and principal librarian, Panizzi was the real ruler of the museum.

== Later life ==
Letter from Ellis (1851)

Ellis shared the secretary position at the Society of Antiquaries from 1848 with John Yonge Akerman, who took over in 1853. He was director of the Society from 1853 to 1857.

Excellent health and the absence of any machinery for compulsory retirement kept Ellis at his post until February 1856, when he resigned on a pension, and lived thirteen years more close to the museum. He died at his house in Bedford Square on 15 January 1869.

== Works ==
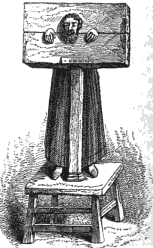
A pillory, illustration from Ellis's Observations on Popular Antiquities (1842).

In 1798 Ellis published at the age of twenty-one his History of St. Leonard's, Shoreditch, and Liberty of Norton Folgate. As an antiquarian, his contributions to Archaeologia were numerous. In 1813 he edited John Brand's Popular Antiquities, a work going back to Henry Bourne. For Rees's Cyclopædia, Ellis contributed articles on Antiquities and other subjects, but the topics are not known.

=== Catalogues and collections ===
His catalogue of the manuscripts of the Society of Antiquaries was published in 1816. Also in that year he published on behalf of the Record Commission the indexes and additional texts to Domesday Book: his general introduction to Domesday, written in 1813, also appeared in separate form (in two volumes) in 1833. With John Caley and others, he published a new edition of William Dugdale's Monasticon between 1817 and 1833. He used his position as head of the manuscript department to publish Original Letters illustrative of English History, mostly drawn from originals in the Museum: three series of this collection appeared, in 1824, 1827, and 1846 respectively, the first in three volumes, the others each in four. He also drew up, as secretary, guides to the departments of the British Museum.

Ellis completed portions of the British Museum catalogue, from A to F and from P to R inclusive, Baber doing all the rest. He was assisted by Thomas Dampier; but his portion of the catalogue was criticised by his successor Panizzi.

=== Numismatics ===
Ellis was a founding member of the Royal Numismatic Society, which was established on 22 December 1836. When the society held its first meeting on 26 January 1837, Ellis was the first to present a "communication" – the topic was the farthings of Queen Anne. Ellis also published several articles in the Numismatic Chronicle, including on stycas of Northumbria, and on the episcopal coinage of York.
