= Paul Henry Maty =

English librarian (1744–1787)

Paul Henry Maty (1744 – 16 January 1787) was an English librarian.

Maty was born in London, the son of the librarian Matthew Maty (1718–1786), and was educated at Trinity College, Cambridge. He vacated a Trinity fellowship to marry in 1775. In 1777 he published his religious doubts about the 39 articles in the Gentleman's Magazine. With his Ecclesiastical advancement thus impeded, he became an assistant librarian, and then under-librarian, at the British Museum.

He was elected a Fellow of the Royal Society in May 1771. He also obtained the job of foreign secretary, and subsequently general secretary, to the Society – although taking Charles Hutton's side in his dispute with the president Joseph Banks forced Maty's resignation in 1784.

From 1782 to 1786 Maty founded, edited and was primary author of a review journal, A New Review: with Literary Curiosities and Literary Intelligence. He indexed the Philosophical Transactions, collaborated with Samuel Ayscough on a catalogue of the British Museum's printed books, and translated the Travels through Germany of Johann Kaspar Riesbeck (1754-1786). Some of his sermons were posthumously published by Samuel Horsley.

On his death he was buried in Bunhill Fields.

== Works ==
- An history of the instances of exclusion from the Royal Society … with strictures on the formation of the council and other instances of the despotism of Sir Joseph Banks, the present president, 1784
- A General Index to the Philosophical Transactions, vols. i–lxx, 1787
- (with Samuel Ayscough & S. Harper) Librorum impressorum qui in Museo britannico, adservantur catalogus, 1787
- (transl.) Travels through Germany, in a series of letters, 1787
- Sermons preached in the British Ambassador's Chapel, at Paris, in the years 1774, 1775, 1776, 1788
