= Owen Manning =

English clergyman and antiquarian (1721–1801)

Owen Manning FSA
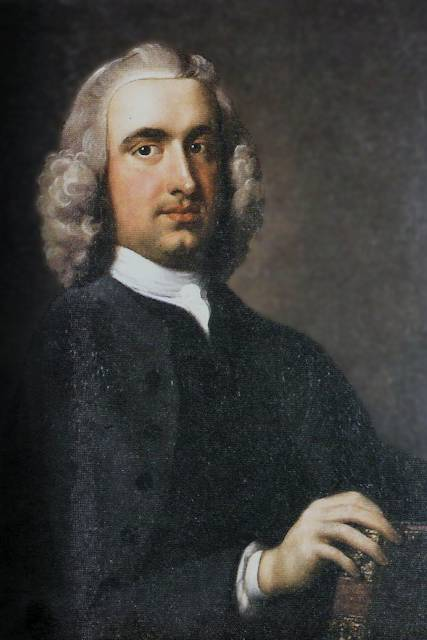
- Born: 11 August 1721; Orlingbury, Northamptonshire
- Died: 9 September 1801 (aged 80); Godalming, Surrey
- Education: Bachelor of Arts (1740); Master of Arts (1744); Bachelor of Divinity (1753)
- Alma mater: Queens' College, Cambridge
- Known for: Clergyman and antiquarian

Owen Manning FSA (11 August 1721 – 9 September 1801) was an English clergyman and antiquarian, known as a historian of Surrey.

== Life ==
Manning was born on 11 August 1721 in Orlingbury, Northamptonshire to a father of the same name. He studied at Queens' College, Cambridge, where he graduated with a Bachelor of Arts in 1740, Master of Arts in 1744, and B.D. Bachelor of Divinity in 1753. While an undergraduate he nearly died of smallpox. In 1741, he was elected to a fellowship which included residence of St Botolph's Church, Cambridge. He retained both these positions until he married in 1755.

He was chaplain to John Thomas, the bishop of Lincoln, who collated him to the prebend of South Scarle in Lincoln Cathedral, 5 August 1757, and on 15 March 1760 to that of Milton Ecclesia, consisting of the impropriation and advowson of the church of Great Milton, Oxfordshire. In 1763 he was presented by Thomas Green, Dean of Salisbury, to the vicarage of Godalming, Surrey, where he lived till his death. In 1769, he was presented by Viscount Midleton to the rectory of Peper Harow, an adjoining parish.

He was elected Fellow of the Royal Society 10 December 1767, and Fellow of the Society of Antiquaries in 1770. He died in Godalming on 9 September 1801. His parishioners placed a marble tablet to his memory in the church, and some private friends put an inscription on a headstone in the churchyard.

== Works ==
He amassed materials for a history of Surrey, but he did not regard his collections as sufficiently complete for publication, and a total loss of sight prevented him from having them printed. The manuscripts were eventually entrusted to William Bray, who published them with his own additions and continuations for the benefit of Manning's widow.

The work appeared under the title of The History and Antiquities of the County of Surrey, with a facsimile Copy of Domesday, engraved on thirteen Plates, three volumes, London, 1804–9–14. There appeared at London in 1819 The Ecclesiastical Topography of the County of Surrey, containing Views of Churches in that County (to illustrate Manning and Bray's History of Surrey), drawn by Hill and engraved by Peak.

Manning completed and published the Saxon dictionary of his friend Edward Lye. He also translated and annotated The Will of King Alfred from the original in the library of Thomas Astle; this was printed in 1788 under the editorship of Sir Herbert Croft.

== Family ==
By Catherine, his wife, daughter of Reade Peacock, an Alderman of Huntingdon, he had three sons and five daughters, all of whom survived him except George Owen Manning, his eldest son (BA of Queens' College, Cambridge, 1778), and one of the daughters, who died young.
