= Joseph Hunter (antiquarian) =

Unitarian Minister, antiquarian, and public records keeper

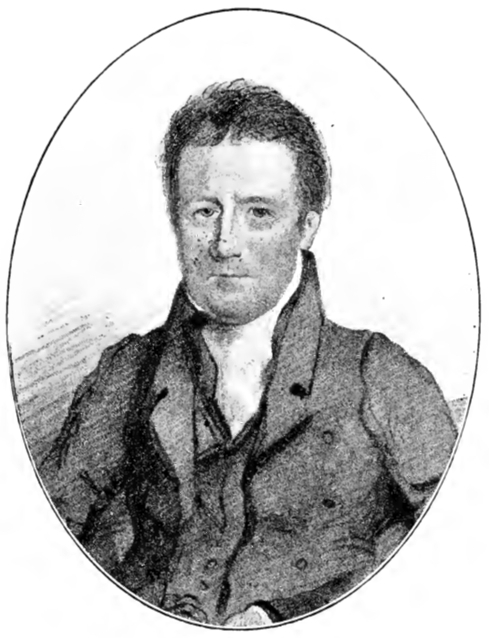
- Born: 6 February 1783 Sheffield, England
- Died: 9 May 1861 (aged 78) London, England

Joseph Hunter FSA (6 February 1783 – 9 May 1861) was a Unitarian Minister, antiquarian, and deputy keeper of public records now best known for his publications Hallamshire. The History and Topography of the Parish of Sheffield in the County of York, the two-volume South Yorkshire (a history of the Deanery of Doncaster), still considered among the best works written on the history of Sheffield and South Yorkshire, and his 1852 pamphlet on Robin Hood in which he argued that a servant of this name at the court of Edward II was identical with the famous outlaw. His name was adopted by the Hunter Archaeological Society.

== Biography ==
Hunter was born in Sheffield on 6 February 1783 to cutler Michael Hunter (1759–1831) and Elizabeth Girdler (1761–1787) in a house on the north side of New Church Street (a site now occupied by the Town Hall). Following the death of his mother in 1787 he was placed under the guardianship of Joseph Evans, a minister at Upper Chapel. He went to school in Attercliffe and subsequently served an apprenticeship as a cutler, obtaining his freedom of the Cutler's Company in September 1804. However, in 1805 he left Sheffield to study theology at Manchester College in York.

In 1809 he moved to Bath to take up a post as a Unitarian Minister at Trim Street Chapel, there he met and married Mary Hayward, with whom he would have six children, one of whom, Sylvester Joseph Hunter, converted to Catholicism and became a Jesuit priest. In 1833 he moved to London to work at the Record Commission as Assistant Keeper of Public Records. In 1843, he was granted a coat of arms and chose as his motto Vita si Cervina (avoid me if you are a deer). He was elected a member of the American Antiquarian Society in 1856. He died in 1861 and is buried at Ecclesfield Parish Church in Sheffield.

From his schooldays onwards, he had been an enthusiastic collector of memorial inscriptions and similar genealogical gleanings. At the time of his death, much of his research remained unpublished. His papers were deposited in the British Museum (now the British Library). Between 1894 and 1896, the Harleian Society published four volumes of his collection of pedigrees under the title Familiae Minorum Gentium.

== Hunter Archaeological Society ==
The Hunter Archaeological Society, which was formed in 1912 "to study and report on the archaeology, history and architecture of South Yorkshire and North Derbyshire", was named in his honour.

== List of publications (excluding articles and papers) ==
- The Ameliorated Condition of the Poor one Benefit derived to the World from Christianity (1811)
- A Tribute to the Memory of the Rev. John Simpson (1813)
- Who Wrote Cavendish's Life of Wolsey? (1815)
- Scripture the Delight and Guide of the Unitarian Christian (1817)
- The Deist, the Christian, and the Unitarian (1819)
- Hallamshire: the History and Topography of the Parish of Sheffield in the County of York (1819)
- Golden Sentences: a Manual that may be used by all who desire to be Moral and Religious (1826)
- South Yorkshire: the History and Topography of the Deanery of Doncaster, in the Diocese and County of York. 2 vols. (1828–31)
- The Life of Sir Thomas More, by his Great-Grandson Cresacre More (1828) (ed. J. Hunter)
- The Hallamshire Glossary (1829) (compiled by J. Hunter)
- The Diary of Ralph Thoresby, F.R.S. 2 vols. (1830) (ed. J. Hunter)
- Letters of Eminent Men addressed to Ralph Thoresby, F.R.S. 2 vols. (1832) (ed. J. Hunter)
- English Monastic Libraries (1831) (compiled by J. Hunter)
- Magnum Rotulum Scaccarii, vel Magnum Rotulum Pipæ [etc.] (1833) (ed. J. Hunter)
- Rotuli Selecti ad res Anglicas et Hibernicas (1834) (ed. J. Hunter)
- The Attorney-General versus Shore (1834)
- Fines sive Pedes Finium [etc.] 2 vols. (1835–42) (ed. J. Hunter)
- A Letter to Patrick Frazer Tytler, Esq., etc. (1837)
- Three Catalogues describing the Contents of the Red Book of the Exchequer [etc.] (1838) (compiled by J. Hunter)
- A Disquisition on the Scene, Origin, Date, etc. of Shakespeare's "Tempest" (1839)
- A Few Words in Reply to the Animadversions of the Rev. Mr. Dyce on Mr. Hunter's "Disquisitions on The Tempest" [etc.] (1853)
- Ecclesiastical Documents (1840) (ed. J. Hunter)
- A True Account of the Alienation and Recovery of the Estates of the Offleys of Norton, in 1754 (1841)
- The Rise of the Old Dissent exemplified by the Life of Oliver Heywood, 1630–1702 (1842)
- The Diary of Dr. Thomas Cartwright, Bishop of Chester (1843) (ed. J. Hunter)
- Gens Sylvestrina: Memorials of some of my good and Religious Ancestors (1846)
- Notes of an English Traveller during a Two Days' Sojourn at Ober-Wesel, on the Rhine (1847)
- Collections Concerning the Early History of the Founders of New Plymouth, the first Colonists of New England (1849)
- Agincourt: a Contribution towards an Authentic List of the Commanders of the English Host [etc.] (1850)
- Milton: a Sheaf of Gleanings after his Biographers and Annotators (1850)
- Antiquarian Notices of Lupset, the Heath, Sharlston, and Ackton (1851)
- The Great Hero of the Ancient Minstrelsy of England, Robin Hood; his Period, real Character, etc., investigated and perhaps ascertained (1852)
- The Connection of Bath with the Literature and Science of England (1853)
- Collections Concerning the Church or Congregation of Protestant Separatists formed at Scrooby, the Founders of New Plymouth [etc.] (1854)
- New Illustrations of the Life, Studies, and Writings of Shakespeare. 2 vols. (1854)
- Pope: his Descent and Family Connections (1857)
