= William Henry Black =

English antiquarian and Seventh-Day Baptist leader

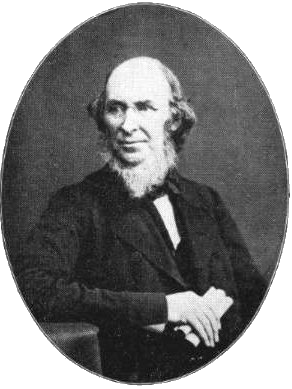
- William Henry Black, unknown date.
- Born: 7 May 1808; Walworth, Surrey
- Died: 12 April 1872; Mill Yard, Whitehall, London
- Occupation(s): Antiquarian, paleographer, preacher

William Henry Black FSA (7 May 1808 – 12 April 1872) was a Victorian antiquarian and Seventh-Day Baptist leader. During his lifetime, he was well known in London antiquarian and literary circles for his talent for paleography and archiving. He was the member of many historical societies, and the founder of three more. He published numerous articles and books, during his lifetime, with more published posthumously.

Black was lesser known, but equally regarded, for his prominence in London Seventh-Day Baptist circles, leading a small congregation in London, which never held more than twenty people. This circle was the subject of a newspaper article in 1869, where the reporter wrote of the contrast between the dilapidated building the services were held in, and their leader, Black, who appeared as "a profound scholar and most courteous gentleman".

== Early life and education ==
William Henry Black was born on 7 May 1808, in Walworth, Surrey, to Mary and John Black of Kitmore. His mother's family, the Langleys, were the wealthy proprietors of estates in Oxfordshire and Buckinghamshire, and strongly influenced Black's religious and historical interests, as well as his future religious opinion. He was educated at a private school, and acted as the tutor of several families in Tulse Hill when he was seventeen.

== Antiquarian career ==
The earliest record of Black's antiquarian interests exist in his catalogues of various libraries. He catalogued the Arundel Manuscripts, at the College of Arms in 1829 (before they were purchased by the British Library) and, as the Leathersellers' Company requested in 1831, Abraham Colfe's grammar school library. From 1831 to 1833, Black worked in Oxford, compiling a catalogue of Elias Ashmole's manuscripts, published in 1845, to much esteem. Early on in his career, he was also a contributor to the works of other antiquarians, including Sir Richard Hoare, 2nd Baronet's The History of Modern Wiltshire (11 vols; 1822–44) and Samuel Bentley's Excerpta Historica (1831). Upon the 1834 Burning of Parliament, Black boasted that he had been the earliest researcher to rush into the parliament buildings in hope of saving their valuable records. Thanks to the many literary contacts he had made while a reader at the British Museum, Black obtained a position at the Record Commission, a 19th-century royal commission into the state of the nation's archives.

This position at the commission proved valuable to Black, as his antiquarian interests were occupied with the training of junior transcribers, and revision of Thomas Rymer's Foedera, a set of volumes detailing "all the leagues, treaties, alliances, capitulations, and confederacies, which have at any time been made between the Crown of England and any other kingdoms, princes and states". He also produced an original work in this time, Docquets of Letters Patent Passed Under Charles I, 1642-6, which was printed in 1837, but only published posthumously.

In 1840, again thanks to his literary connections, and his reputation as a paleographer, Black acquired the position of assistant keeper at the Public Record Office, which had been established only two years earlier. His duties, here, included cataloguing the Pell Office records and preparing reports on the records of HM Treasury. This career lasted until 1853, as his vehement Sabbatarianism annoyed his employers, who required him to work on Saturdays, though his duties at the Treasury continued until 1854.

Black was elected a Fellow of the Society of Antiquaries of London in 1858, and was appointed into the Society's council three times, in 1863, 1864, and 1867. He was one of the earliest members of the British Archaeological Association (est. 1843) the Camden Society, and several English local history societies, specifically: the Surrey, London and Middlesex, and Wiltshire Archaeological societies. He was also the founder of three antiquarian societies, all concerning Biblical archaeology: the Chronological Institute of London (est. 1850), the Palestine Archaeological Association, and the Anglo-Biblical Institute. By 1870, each of these had been voluntarily subsumed into the newly founded Society of Biblical Archaeology (which was, itself, later absorbed into the Royal Asiatic Society). According to Bernard Nurse of the Oxford Dictionary of National Biography, Black was "highly regarded by his contemporaries", and John Ashton, writing for the Dictionary of National Biography, has called him "a conscientious and painstaking antiquary". In his obituary, he was flatteringly described as being "richly stored with archaic learning and palaeographical knowledge, which he was always alike ready to impart to the youthful student and to give to the world at large."

Black was a prolific historical researcher. He issued several pamphlets on Biblical history, and the majority of issues of the Journal of the British Archaeological Association, from 1846 to 1872, contained articles by him. As a fellow of the society, several of his communications were published in the Proceedings of the Society of Antiquaries of London, between 1861 and 1871. His first communication to the Society concerned the will of Hans Holbein the Younger, and caused a significant stir, with his obituary in the Proceedings claiming it caused "a complete revolution in the history of Holbein's works". Black also edited three volumes of early modern English poetry, for publication by the Percy Society. Near the end of his life, Black prepared an edition of the Antonine Itinerary for the Rolls Series, which Ashton recorded "still await[ed] editing and publication" in 1886, and never ended up being published.

== Seventh-Day Baptism ==
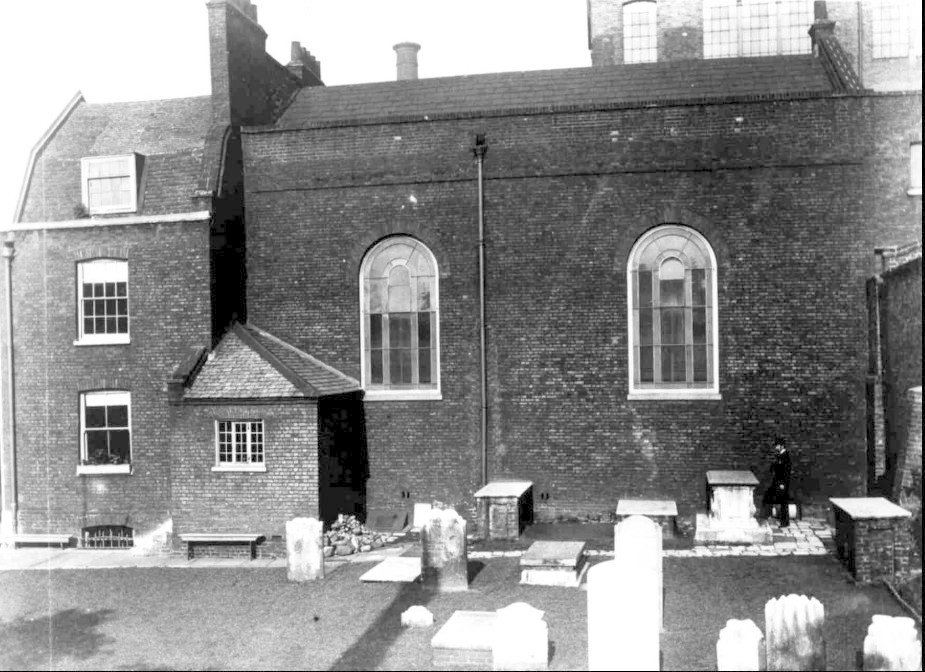
The Baptist Church of Mill Yard, Whitechapel, c. 1883

In 1840, Black became the afternoon preacher of a small Seventh-Day Baptist community in Mill Yard, on Leman Street, Whitechapel, following from J. B. Shepston. During this time there were only five members: himself, and the Slaters: Harriet (his third wife), Ann, Charlotte and Sophia. Here, he occupied the minister's house of 15 Mill Yard. While he served here, the congregation never grew over twenty people. At this congregation, Black was constantly involved in litigation relating to his religious matters. A member of the Liverpool Metropolitan Cathedral charged Black with crypto-Judaism, due to his emphasis in the Old Testament in his sermons, a charge which Black vigorously rebuked. In 1851, he was charged with libeling a fellow Baptist minister, and was forced to pay heavy damages. Black continued as the minister of this congregation until his death, in 1872. He was followed by his son-in-law, William Mead Jones. In 1885, this congregation moved from Mill Yard, as their premises were sold on to the LTS Railway Company.

In 1869, Black's congregation was the subject of a newspaper article by C. M. Davies, where he found the building in disrepair, with a languishing fourteen-person congregation, in an "unlikely-looking, unsavoury place". Despite this, Davies records his meeting with Black as a pleasant surprise:

A venerable scholar-like old man, arrayed in clerical black, and with a long white beard, received me most courteously, [...] I expected to find some illiterate minister, with a hobby ridden to death, when lo ! I found myself in the presence of a profound scholar and most courteous gentleman, who informed me that he thought in Latin, said his prayers in Hebrew, and read his New Testament lessons from the original Greek. [...] Shall I add another "idea" also? — that it would be no harm if some of our Sunday preachers would take a quiet run out on Saturday to Goodman's Fields, and carry away an original notion or two from [...] the Seventh-day Baptist minister, William Henry Black, FSA.

== Personal life and death ==
William Henry Black was married three times. Black first married, at age twenty-two, to Elizabeth White. They had three daughters. In 1841, Black was remarried to Mary Anne (d. 1843), daughter of doctor Benjamin Noakes. Again, in 1844, Black was remarried to Harriot (d. 1861), daughter of William Slater, minister of Mill Yard. Theodora, Black's daughter, married William Mead Jones, who became his successor as pastor.

While at his job in the Public Record Office, Black suffered a marked decline in health, and believed his vision was damaged after a sewage-related incident in the Treasury Chambers. Davies recorded that Black was a keen poet, "one of the irritabile genus vatum [irritable race of poets (Horace)]", having rebuked claims of crypto-Judaism using the medium. Black died in Mill Yard, on 12 April 1872, leaving behind less than £1500 in his will.

== Bibliography ==
- Catalogue of the Arundel Manuscripts in the Library of the College of Arms (Not published; 1829)
- Bibliothecæ Colfanæ catalogus. Catalogue of the library in the Free grammar-school at Lewisham, founded by Rev. Abraham Colfe (London: Worshipful Company of Leathersellers; 1831)
- Docquets of Letters Patent and other Instruments Passed under the Great Seal of King Charles I at Oxford in the years 1642-6 (Printed but never published; 1836)
- Treatise on Arabic Numerals (Manuscript; 1839)
- "A Paraphrase on the Seven Penitential Psalms in English Verse" in Percy Society Early English Poetry and Ballads of the Middle Ages, 7 (London: Percy Society; 1842)
- A Descriptive, Analytical and Critical Catalogue of the Manuscripts Bequeathed unto the University of Oxford by Elias Ashmole (Oxford: Oxford University Press; 1845)
- The Life and martyrdom of Thomas Beket, archbishop of Canterbury: from the series of lives and legends now proved to have been composed by Robert of Gloucester (London: Percy Society; 1845)
- The enterlude of John Bon & Mast Person : a dialogue on the festival of Corpus Christi and on transubstantiation in verse (London: Percy Society; 1852)
- On the Records of Chester Castle (Chester: The Courant Office; 1854)
- "The Calendar of Palestine, Reconciled with the Law of Moses, against the Theory of Michealis" (London: Chronological Institute; 1861-2)
- Discovery of the Will of Hans Holbein (London: J.B. Nichols & Sons; 1863)
- Letters to Eminent Antiquaries on the Primitive Site and Plan of Roman (London: Private Distribution; 1863)'
- History and Antiquities of the Worshipful Company of Leathersellers (London; 1871)
