= Charter roll =

Medieval documents recording charters

A charter roll is an administrative record created by a medieval chancery that recorded all the charters issued by that office.

== Origins ==
In medieval England, King John in 1199 established a fixed rate of fees for the sealing of charters and letters patent. It was to keep track of these fees that the first Charter Roll was started (as a fee book) in 1199, under the Chancellorship of Hubert Walter. The Roll thereby also kept track of all charters that had been issued by the government – the letters patent being swiftly hived off into the patent rolls. Instead of keeping the records in a register or book form, they were written on sheets of parchment stitched together into long rolls to form a roll for each year.

=== Minority hiatus ===
During the minority of Henry III of England, no perpetual grants could be made by the Crown, so that the Charter Rolls were in abeyance until 1227.

== Publication ==
The Charter Rolls for the years 1199 to 1216 were published as abbreviated Latin texts (in a near-facsimile of the manuscripts, employing a special "record type" typeface) by the Record Commission in 1837, in a large folio volume entitled Rotuli Chartarum in Turri Londinensi asservati, edited by T. D. Hardy. Calendars (summaries) of the rolls from 1226 to 1516 were published in six volumes by the Public Record Office between 1903 and 1927. Historians use the acronym Cal. charter R. for those published in calendar form.

== See also ==
- Hanaper
- Pipe rolls
- Patent roll
