= William Bray (antiquary) =

English antiquarian (1736–1832)

William Bray FSA
- Born: 1736; Surrey, England
- Died: 1832 (aged 95–96)
- Occupation: antiquary
- Known for: co-author of a county history of Surrey
- Notable work: The History and Antiquities of the County of Surrey
- Spouse: Mary Stephens (m. 1758; died 1796)
- Parents: Edward Bray (father); Ann Bray (mother)
- Awards: Fellow of the Society of Antiquaries

William Bray FSA (1736–1832) was an English antiquary, best known as co-author of a county history of Surrey.

== Life ==
Bray was the fourth and youngest son of Edward Bray of Shere in Surrey, who married Ann, daughter of Rev. George Duncomb. When ten years old he entered Rugby School. On leaving school he was placed with an attorney, Mr. Martyr, at Guildford, but not long afterwards obtained a position in the Board of Green Cloth, which he held for nearly fifty years and was then superannuated.

On the death of his elder brother, the Rev. George Bray, on 1 March 1803, he inherited the family estates in Shere and Gomshall. His position in the county and his legal training caused him to be associated in many charitable and civil trusts in Surrey. He died at Shere 21 December 1832, aged 96, and a mural monument was erected to his memory in its church.

== Works ==
Bray was elected Fellow of the Society of Antiquaries in 1771, became the treasurer of the society in 1803, and contributed frequently to its journal, Archaeologia. His first publication was the "Sketch of a Tour into Derbyshire and Yorkshire". Originally published anonymously in 1777, the second edition appeared with the author's name in 1783, and it was subsequently frequently reprinted, and was included in John Pinkerton's Travels. His next work, which was printed privately, was Collections relating to Henry Smith, sometime Alderman of London.

When Owen Manning, who had begun a county history of Surrey, died in 1801, Bray undertook to complete the work, and visited every parish and church within the county's borders. The first volume of The History and Antiquities of the County of Surrey was issued in 1804, the second in 1809, and the third in 1814. Bray's last literary labour was the printing and editing of the Memoirs of the Life and Writings of John Evelyn, comprising his Diary, which was first published in 1818 in two volumes, appeared in 1827 in five volumes; it was often reissued.

A preserved 1755 diary by then-18-year-old Bray contains the entry: "After Dinner Went to Miss Seale's to play at Base Ball, with her, the 3 Miss Whiteheads, Miss Billinghurst, Miss Molly Flutter, Mr. Chandler, Mr. Ford, H. Parsons & Jolly. Drank tea and stayed till 8." Baseball historians consider this one of the earliest documented references to the sport, although the rules of the specific game referenced by Bray are unknown.

== Family ==
In 1758 he married Mary, daughter of Henry Stephens of Wipley, in Worplesdon, who died 14 December 1796, aged 62, having had numerous children. Only three, one son and two daughters, lived to maturity, and the son predeceased his father.
