= John Bayley (antiquary) =

English antiquary

John Whitcomb Bayley FRS FSA (29 May 1787 – 25 March 1869) was an English antiquary.

== Life ==
Bayley was born in 1787, the second son of farmer John Bayley of Hempsted, Gloucestershire. At an early age he became a junior clerk in the Tower Record Office. In or about 1819 he was appointed chief clerk, and afterwards a sub-commissioner on the Public Records. In the latter capacity he edited Calendars of the Proceedings in Chancery in the Reign of Queen Elizabeth in 3 volumes for the Record Commission (1827–32), for which he is said not only to have received the sum of £2,739, but to have claimed further remuneration. His exorbitant charges and mode of editing were vigorously assailed by Charles Purton Cooper, then secretary to the Commission, Sir Nicholas Harris Nicolas, and others.

A committee was appointed to inquire into the circumstances, and, after meeting no fewer than seventeen times, issued a report, of which twenty-five copies were printed for the private use of the board. His demands upon the corporation of Liverpool, to whom he charged between £3,000 and £4,000 for searches, formed the subject of a separate inquiry. Owing to his long absence, Bayley's office at the Tower was declared vacant in May 1834. He had been admitted to the Inner Temple in August 1815, but was never called to the bar.

During the rest of his life he resided mostly at Cheltenham, but later at Paris, where he died on 25 March 1869. He was a Fellow of the Society of Antiquaries (elected 1819; amoved 1845) and of the Royal Society (elected 1823).

== Works ==
Bayley's History and Antiquities of the Tower of London appeared in two parts in 1821–5, and an abridgment was published in 1830. He announced, but did not publish, a history of London. He had also made considerable progress on a complete parliamentary history of England, and for this he obtained copious abstracts of the returns to parliament, 1702–10, from the original records in the Rolls Chapel. This manuscript, together with a collection of charters, letters patent, and other documents illustrative of local history, in three folio volumes, was afterwards deposited in the British Museum (now British Library).

== Family ==
In September 1824, Bayley married Sophia Anne, daughter of the Right Hon. Colonel Robert Ward and granddaughter of Viscount Bangor. She died before him, on 17 June 1854, leaving a son and daughter.
