= Grand compounder =

Type of student

In the 19th century, a grand compounder was a degree candidate at the University of Oxford who paid extra for his degree; £30 rather than £7 for a BA, and £40 rather than £14 for an MA. Undergraduates with a certain high level of income were required to do this; in 1817 this level was a benefice rated in the Kings Books at £40, or other income in excess of £300. The practice was abolished in 1857.

In exchange for their money, at their graduation a grand compounder was able to process from his college to the convocation house and back again in the company of the Vice-Chancellor, wearing a scarlet gown. In earlier times a trumpeter walked in front blowing his instrument.

At the University of Cambridge the income threshold for a compounder was £26 13s 4d.
