= Patent roll =

Administrative document

The patent rolls (Latin: Rotuli litterarum patentium) are a series of administrative records compiled in the English, Irish, British and United Kingdom Chancery, running from 1201 to the present day.

== Description ==
The patent rolls comprise a register of the letters patent issued by the Crown, and sealed "open" with the Great Seal pendent, expressing the sovereign's will on a wide range of matters of public interest, including – but not restricted to – grants of official positions, lands, commissions, privileges and pardons, issued both to individuals and to corporations. The rolls were started in the reign of King John, under the Chancellorship of Hubert Walter. The texts of letters patent were copied onto sheets of parchment, which were stitched together (head-to-tail) into long rolls to form a roll for each year. As the volume of business grew, it became necessary to compile more than one roll for each year.

The most solemn grants of lands and privileges were issued, not as letters patent, but as charters, and were entered on the separate series of Charter Rolls. This series was discontinued in 1516, and all charters issued thereafter, mainly for grants of titles, were entered on the patent rolls.

The patent rolls run in an almost unbroken series from 1201 to the present day, with a small number of gaps, notably during the English Civil War and Interregnum (1641–1660). They are written almost exclusively in Latin in the early period. English was used occasionally in the 16th century, but only during the Commonwealth and after 1733 are all the entries in English.

== Custodial history ==
The medieval rolls were originally stored in the Tower of London, which was the principal repository for Chancery archives. From the end of the 14th century, it became customary for the Master of the Rolls to house the more recent rolls, for convenience of access, in the Rolls Chapel, prior to their permanent transfer to the Tower. These transfers ceased at the end of the 15th century, and so the Rolls Chapel became the permanent place of deposit for all rolls from the reign of Richard III onwards. The rolls from both sites were reunited at the newly built Public Record Office in the 1850s, and they are now held at the National Archives, Kew, London, where their class reference is C 66. As of 2016, there are 5,790 rolls in the series, dating from 1201 to 2012.

== Patents of invention ==
Letters patent were also issued to grant monopolies over particular industries to individuals with new techniques, and these grants were likewise copied onto the patent rolls. The system became subject to abuse in the reigns of Elizabeth I and James I, and was eventually regulated by the Statute of Monopolies of 1624, the first statutory expression of English patent law. In 1853, responsibility for patents of invention was transferred to the newly established Patent Office, and they ceased to be registered on the patent rolls.

== Publication ==
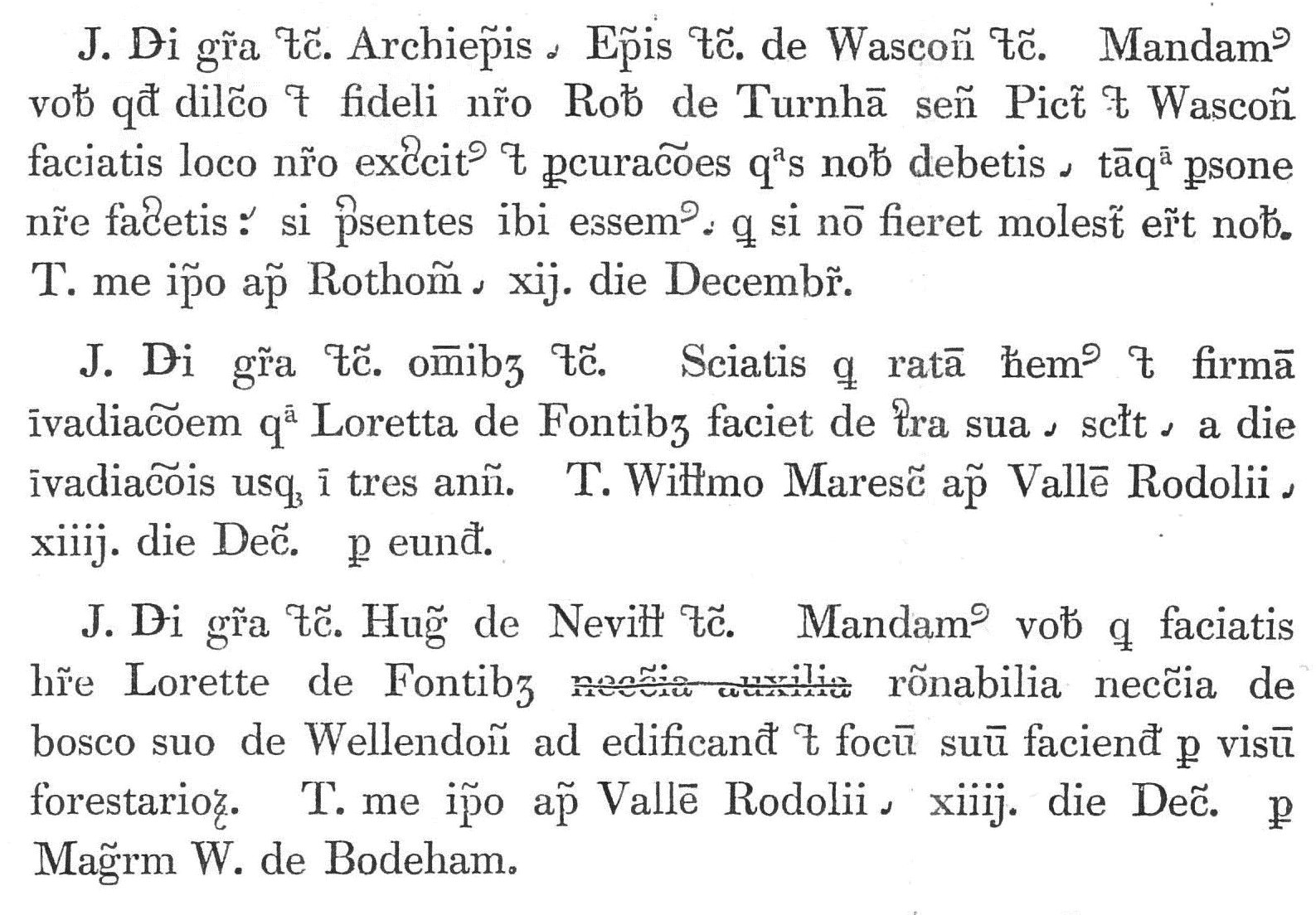
Extract from the Patent Roll for 3 John (1201–2), as published by the Record Commission in 1835 using record type

All the medieval and early modern rolls to 1625 have been published in some form, although editorial policies and formats have varied.

- 1201–1216. The rolls for these years were published as abbreviated Latin texts by the Record Commission in 1835, in a large folio volume entitled Rotuli Litterarum Patentium in Turri Londinensi asservati ("Rolls of Letters Patent preserved in the Tower of London"), edited by Thomas Duffus Hardy, later sometimes abbreviated as Pat. Roll. T.L. The publication employed a special "record type" font to produce a near-facsimile of the manuscripts.
- 1216–1232. The rolls for these years were published as full Latin texts (with contractions and abbreviations extended) in two volumes published in 1901 and 1903, simply entitled Patent Rolls.
- 1232–1509. The post-1232 rolls have not been published as full texts, but in calendar form (i.e. as comprehensive English summaries, with all significant details included). Between 1891 and 1916, 53 volumes of calendars were published, under the title Calendar of the Patent Rolls, covering the years 1232 to 1509. References to these volumes may be abbreviated as CPR or Cal. patent R.
- 1509–1547. The rolls for the reign of Henry VIII (1509–47) have not been published in a stand-alone form. Their contents were, however, incorporated (in calendar form) into the series Letters and Papers of the Reign of Henry VIII, published between 1862 and 1932.
- 1547–1582. The rolls for the years 1547–1582 were published in calendar form in 19 volumes, under the title Calendar of the Patent Rolls, between 1924 and 1986.
- 1582–1603. In the late 1980s, the Public Record Office suspended its programme of scholarly publication, and the initiative passed to the List and Index Society. Between 1990 and 1994 the Society published five volumes of "draft" calendars covering the years 1584–1589; and between 2000 and 2014 it published 30 volumes of full calendars with indexes covering the years 1582–1603. In 2017 and 2018 it published two volumes of revised calendars for the years 1591–1593; and also in 2018 it published a volume of corrigenda for the period 1582–1603.
- 1603–1625. Calendars and indexes of the rolls for the reign of James VI and I (1603–1625) were published by the List and Index Society in 14 volumes between 1974 and 1989. These are facsimiles (reproduced from microfilm) of contemporary 17th-century finding aids. Although of value, they do not meet modern scholarly standards of comprehensiveness or accuracy.

Commissions of gaol delivery and assize were entered on the backs of the rolls: these entries have generally not been included in the published editions.

=== Online availability ===
Hardy's 1835 edition of the rolls for 1201–1216 is available online in a non-searchable form. The published texts and calendars from 1216 to 1452 have been made available online in a fully searchable form by the University of Iowa.

== See also ==
- Charter roll – Medieval documents recording charters
- Pipe rolls – Medieval and post-medieval financial documents
