= Rolls of Parliament =

Official records of the English and UK Parliaments

The Rolls of Parliament (Latin: Rotuli parliamentorum or Rot. Parl.) were the official records of the English Parliament and the subsequent Parliament of the United Kingdom. They recorded meetings of Parliament and Acts of Parliament.

== History ==
Until 1483 the rolls recorded parliamentary proceedings (petitions, bills and answers, both public and private) which formed the basis of Acts of Parliament, but seldom the statutes themselves. From 1483 to 1534 both public and private acts were enrolled in the rolls; after 1535 only those private acts for which an enrolment fee was paid appear, and from 1593 only the titles of private acts are mentioned in the rolls. By 1629 all proceedings other than the acts themselves disappeared from the rolls and from 1759 the titles of private acts disappeared too.

Enrolment of public acts on manuscript parchment rolls continued until 1850. The longest Act of Parliament in the form of a scroll is an act regarding taxation passed in 1821. It is nearly a quarter of a mile (348 metres) long, and used to take two men a whole day to rewind.

Until 1850, a paper draft was brought into the House in which the bill started; after the committee stage there the bill was inscribed on a parchment roll and this parchment was then passed to the other House which could introduce amendments. The original bill was never re-written and knives were used to scrape away the script from the top surface of the rolls, before new text was added. Since 1850 two copies of each act have been printed on vellum, one for preservation in the House of Lords (now the Parliamentary Archives), and the other for transmission to the Public Record Office (now The National Archives).

== Editing ==
The rolls for 1272–1503 were first published in the eighteenth century, as Rotuli Parliamentorum; ut et Petitiones, et Placita in Parliamento (London, 1767–77), under the general editorship of John Strachey. A modern CD-ROM edition has been supported by the Leverhulme Trust, as The Parliament Rolls of Medieval England.

References to Rolls of Parliament are often abbreviated to Rot. Parl.

== See also ==
- Statute roll
