= Humble address =

Parliamentary procedure

In British parliamentary procedure, a humble address is a communication from one of the houses of the Parliament of the United Kingdom to the monarch. For example, following the speech from the throne opening a session of parliament, each house will debate the contents of the speech under a motion for a humble address thanking the King for the speech.

In modern times the humble address approach tends to be used, rarely, by MPs of the opposition party to compel the government to disclose documents through a humble address for a return.

== Address for a return ==
In the United Kingdom, a humble address for a return is a rarely-used parliamentary procedure by which either the House of Commons or House of Lords may petition the monarch, and by extension HM Government, to order documents to be produced. Erskine May notes that this power was used frequently until the mid-19th century, though most such information is now provided by command papers or the explanatory documents attached to acts of Parliament.

In modern times the humble address approach tends to be used, rarely, by MPs of the opposition party to compel the government to disclose documents. It can be debated, amended and voted on like any other motion. According to Erskine May's authoritative Parliamentary Practice, each MP can call for the production of papers by means of a motion for a return. John Bercow, when Speaker of the House of Commons, concluded "Motions of this kind have traditionally been regarded as binding or effective". The government can be held to be in contempt of parliament if it does not abide by the passing of a motion for a return.

== Examples ==
=== Women's Suffrage ===
In 1866, as part of a campaign to extend the electoral franchise to women, John Stuart Mill moved an address for a "Return of the number of Freeholders, Householders, and others in England and Wales who, fulfilling the conditions of property or rental prescribed by Law as the qualification for the Electoral Franchise, are excluded from the Franchise by reason of their sex" in order to debate the petition he had presented. The government of the day accepted the motion, but may not have provided the information specifically requested.

=== Economic Impact of Brexit ===
In 2017, the House of Commons voted to issue a humble address to request the government to reveal documents about the potential impact of Brexit on the British economy. The motion, put forward by the opposition, requested:

That an humble Address be presented to Her Majesty, That she will be graciously pleased to give directions that the list of sectors analysed under the instruction of Her Majesty's Ministers, and referred to in the Answer of 26 June 2017 to Question 239, be laid before this House and that the impact assessments arising from those analyses be provided to the Committee on Exiting the European Union.

The Daily Telegraph reported that the Queen was not happy at being drawn into a political issue, which the monarch, by convention, avoids.

=== Terms of Brexit ===
A second Brexit-related humble address was placed before the House on 13 November 2018, seeking the release of legal advice given to the government regarding the proposed EU withdrawal agreement:

That an humble address be presented to Her Majesty, that she will be graciously pleased to give directions that the following papers be laid before parliament: any legal advice in full, including that provided by the attorney general, on the proposed withdrawal agreement on the terms of the UK’s departure from the European Union including the Northern Ireland backstop and framework for a future relationship between the UK and the European Union.

The government's response was presented to Parliament by the Attorney General, Geoffrey Cox, on 3 December. However, the following day, it was deemed by MPs to be incomplete, which led to a vote in which, for the first time in history, the Government of the United Kingdom was found to be in contempt of Parliament.

=== No-Deal Brexit ===
Former Conservative Party Attorney General Dominic Grieve laid a third Brexit-related humble address before the House on 9 September 2019; requiring the publication of documents related to no-deal Brexit (Operation Yellowhammer) and to the prorogation of Parliament scheduled for later that day, it was passed by 311 votes to 302. The motion provided as follows:

That an Humble Address be presented to Her Majesty, that she will be graciously pleased to direct Ministers to lay before this House, not later than 11.00pm Wednesday 11 September, all correspondence and other communications (whether formal or informal, in both written and electronic form, including but not limited to messaging services including WhatsApp, Telegram, Signal, Facebook messenger, private email accounts both encrypted and unencrypted, text messaging and iMessage and the use of both official and personal mobile phones) to, from or within the present administration, since 23 July 2019 relating to the prorogation of Parliament sent or received by one or more of the following individuals: Hugh Bennett, Simon Burton, Dominic Cummings, Nikki da Costa, Tom Irven, Sir Roy Stone, Christopher James, Lee Cain or Beatrice Timpson; and that Ministers be further directed to lay before this House no later than 11.00pm Wednesday 11 September all the documents prepared within Her Majesty's Government since 23 July 2019 relating to operation Yellowhammer and submitted to the Cabinet or a Cabinet Committee.

=== The Appointment of Lord Lebedev ===
Opposition leader Keir Starmer tabled a humble address requesting information relating to the peerage of Evgeny Lebedev. The peerage had been appointed against the advice of the House of Lords Appointments Commission. This was the first time that a peerage had been appointed against advice given by the commission. The prime minister is the only person with veto over peerages.

That an humble Address be presented to Her Majesty that she will be graciously pleased to give directions that there be laid before this House, no later than 28 April,

(a) any document held by the Cabinet Office or the Prime Minister’s Office containing or relating to advice from, or provided to, the House of Lords Appointments Commission concerning the appointment of Evgeny Alexandrovich Lebedev as a Member of the House of Lords; and

(b) the minutes of, submissions relevant to and electronic communications relating to, any meeting within the Cabinet Office or the Prime Minister’s Office at which the appointment of Lord Lebedev, or advice relating to that appointment, was discussed in a form which may contain redactions, but such redactions shall be solely for the purposes of national security.

=== The Appointment of Lord Mandelson as Ambassador to the US ===
On 4 February 2026, opposition leader Kemi Badenoch tabled a humble address requesting disclosure of information in relation to Peter Mandelson's appointment as UK Ambassador to the US by the government of the day. This followed new revelations regarding Mandelson's relationship with convicted sex offender Jeffrey Epstein and alleged leaking to him of highly classified government documents.

That an humble Address be presented to His Majesty, that he will be graciously pleased to give directions to require the Government to lay before this House all papers relating to Lord Mandelson’s appointment as His Majesty’s Ambassador to the United States of America, including but not confined to the Cabinet Office due diligence which was passed to Number 10, the Conflict of Interest Form Lord Mandelson provided to the Foreign, Commonwealth and Development Office (FCDO), material the FCDO and the Cabinet Office provided to UK Security Vetting about Lord Mandelson’s interests in relation to Global Counsel, including his work in relation to Russia and China, and his links to Jeffrey Epstein, papers for, and minutes of, meetings relating to the decision to appoint Lord Mandelson, electronic communications between the Prime Minister’s Chief of Staff and Lord Mandelson, and between ministers and Lord Mandelson, in the six months prior to his appointment, minutes of meetings between Lord Mandelson and ministers in the six months prior to his appointment, all information on Lord Mandelson provided to the Prime Minister prior to his assurance to this House on 10 September 2025 that ‘full due process was followed during this appointment’, electronic communications and minutes of all meetings between Lord Mandelson and ministers, Government officials and special advisers during his time as Ambassador, and the details of any payments made to Lord Mandelson on his departure as Ambassador and from the Civil Service.

Said papers, comprising more than a thousand pages in three volumes, were published by His Majesty's Government 1 June 2026. Every government department was involved. and some material had to be declassified, en toto the largest response to a humble address in the history.

=== The Appointment of Prince Andrew as Trade Envoy ===
On 24 February 2026, the Liberal Democrats tabled a humble address requesting that the government release information about the appointment of Andrew Mountbatten-Windsor, then known as Prince Andrew, as UK trade envoy. This followed his arrest on suspicion of misconduct in public office on 19 February.

That an humble Address be presented to His Majesty, that he will be graciously pleased to give directions to require the Government to lay before this House all papers relating to the creation of the role of Special Representative for Trade and Investment and Andrew Mountbatten-Windsor’s appointment to that role, including but not confined to any documents held by UK Trade and Investment, British Trade International (BTI) and its successors, the Foreign, Commonwealth and Development Office, the Cabinet Office and the Prime Minister’s Office containing or relating to advice from, or provided to, the Group Chief Executive of BTI, Peter Mandelson, the Cabinet Office and the Prime Minister regarding the suitability of Andrew Mountbatten-Windsor for the appointment, due diligence and vetting conducted in relation to the appointment, and minutes of meetings and electronic communications regarding the due diligence and vetting.

== See also ==
- Humble Petition and Advice – 1657 constitution of England, Scotland and Ireland
- Privileged Bodies of the United Kingdom – Institutions with the right to address the British Sovereign
