= John Caley =

British antiquarian (1760–1834)

John Caley FSA (1760–1834) was an English archivist and antiquary.

== Life ==
He was the eldest son of John Caley, a grocer in Bishopsgate Street, London. Acquaintance with Thomas Astle led to a place in the Record Office in the Tower of London. In 1787 he received from Lord William Bentinck, the Clerk of the Pipe, the keepership of the records in the Augmentation office, in place of H. Brooker; and in 1818, on the death of George Rose, he was appointed keeper of the records in the ancient treasury at Westminster. Meanwhile, he had entered Gray's Inn, on 11 January 1786, but never proceeded to the bar.

When the first Record Commission was nominated in 1801, Caley was appointed secretary, an office which he continued to hold until the dissolution of the commission in March 1831. A special office, that of sub-commissioner, to superintend the arranging, repairing, and binding of records, was created for him, with a salary of £500 a year, besides retaining his two keeperships.

Caley died at his house in Exmouth Street, Spa Fields, on 28 April 1834, aged 71. His library, rich in topography and collections of reports and searches made by him as a legal antiquary during a period of fifty years, was sold by Evans in the following July. Several of his manuscripts were acquired by the British Museum.

== Works ==
As a sub-commissioner Caley became a joint-editor in fourteen of the works undertaken by the commission. He also printed, at the request of Thomas Burgess, a few copies of the Ecclesiastical Survey of the Possessions, &c., of the Bishop of St. David's (1812).

In 1813, he engaged, in conjunction with Bulkeley Bandinel and Sir Henry Ellis, to prepare a new edition of William Dugdale's Monasticon, which extended to six volumes, the first of which appeared in 1817, the last in 1830. He mainly furnished documents. Caley was elected a Fellow of the Society of Antiquaries in March 1786, and contributed a memoir "On the Origin of the Jews in England" to the eighth volume of the Archæologia (pp. 389–405) His other contributions were: in 1789 an extract from a manuscript in the Augmentation Office relative to a wardrobe account of Henry VIII (ix. 243–52); in 1790 a valuation (temp. Henry VIII) of the shrine called Corpus Christi Shrine at York (x. 469–71); and in 1791 the "Survey of the Manor of Wymbledon, alias Wimbleton",’ taken by the parliamentary commissioners in November 1649 (x. 399–448). He was also a Fellow of the Royal Society and Linnean Society, and a member of the Society of Arts.

== Reputation ==
To Caley's influence were attributed many of the scandals of the Record Commission. He had critics in the arranging and binding of the records; and he also removed the seals from documents. Applicants for historical documents had to apply at Caley's private house, a costly and unreliable process. The only indexes were in Caley's possession at his house.
