= Burtt =

Burtt is an English surname. Notable people with the surname include:

- Ben Burtt (born 1948), American sound editor
- Benjamin A. Burtt (born 1984), American sound editor, son of Ben
- Brian Burtt (1913–2008), English botanist and taxonomist
- Edward H. Burtt, Jr. (1948–2016), American ornithologist, writer, and educator
- Edwin Arthur Burtt (1892–1989), American philosopher
- Joseph Burtt (1818–1876), British archivist
- Leighton Burtt (born 1984), New Zealand cricketer
- Robert M. Burtt, American aviator and writer
- Steve Burtt Jr. (born 1984), American-Ukrainian basketball player
- Steve Burtt Sr. (born 1962), American basketball player
- Tom Burtt (1915–1988), New Zealand cricketer
- Wilson Bryant Burtt (1875–1957), American army officer
