= Record type =

Typefaces to reproduce medieval manuscripts

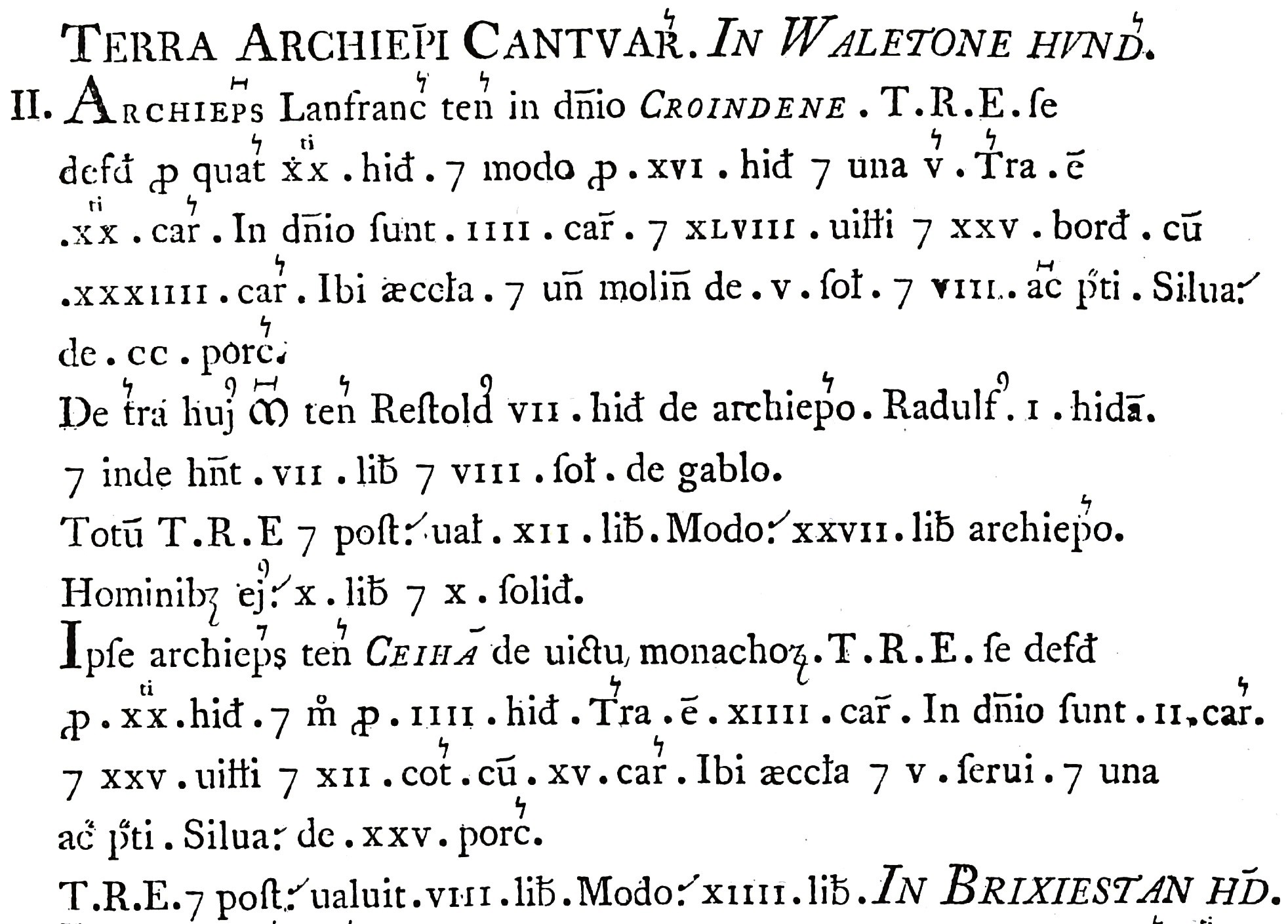
Entries for Croydon and Cheam, Surrey, in Domesday Book (1086), as published by Abraham Farley in 1783 using John Nichols' record type

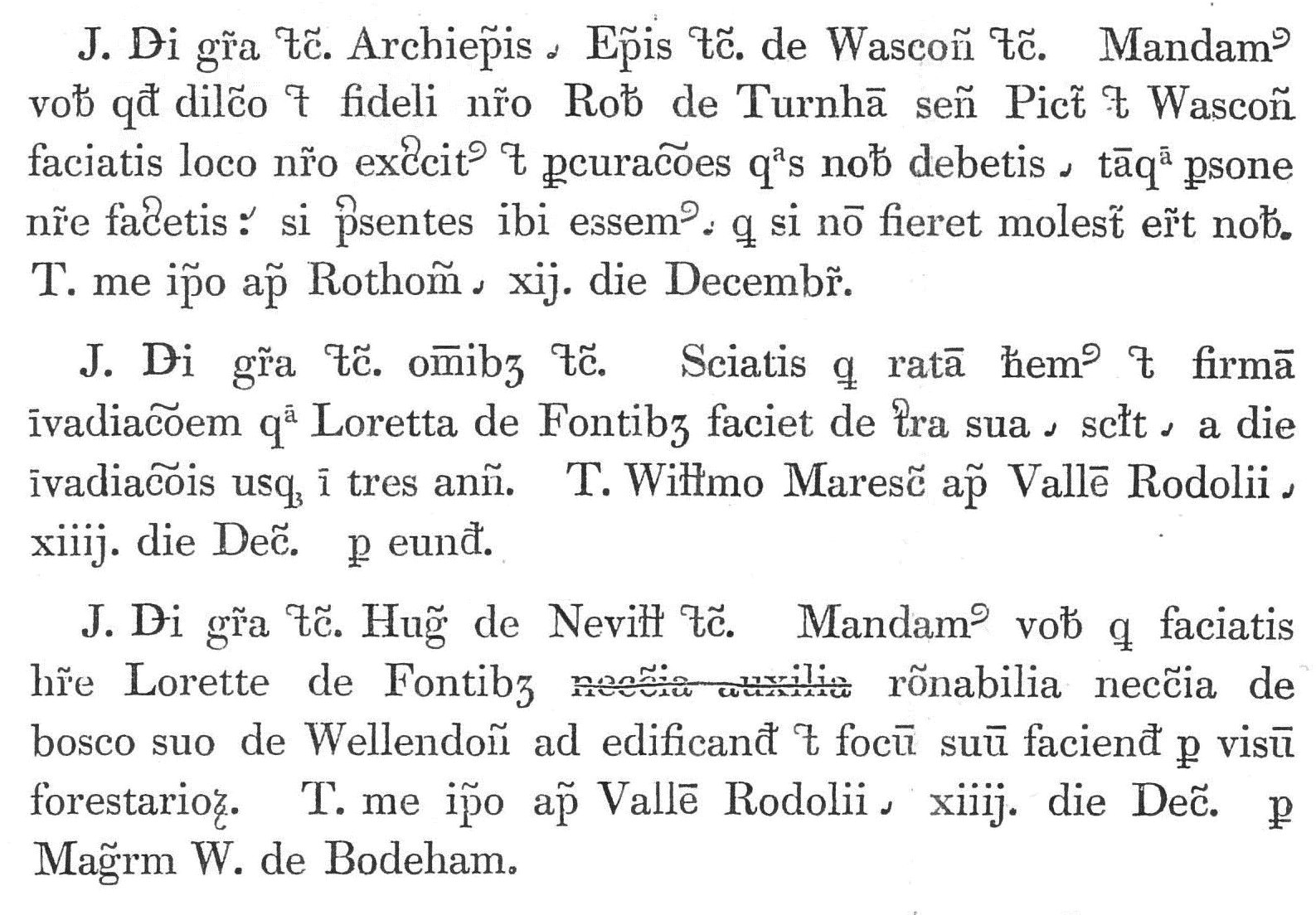
Extract from the Patent Roll for 3 John (1201–2), as published by the Record Commission in 1835 using record type

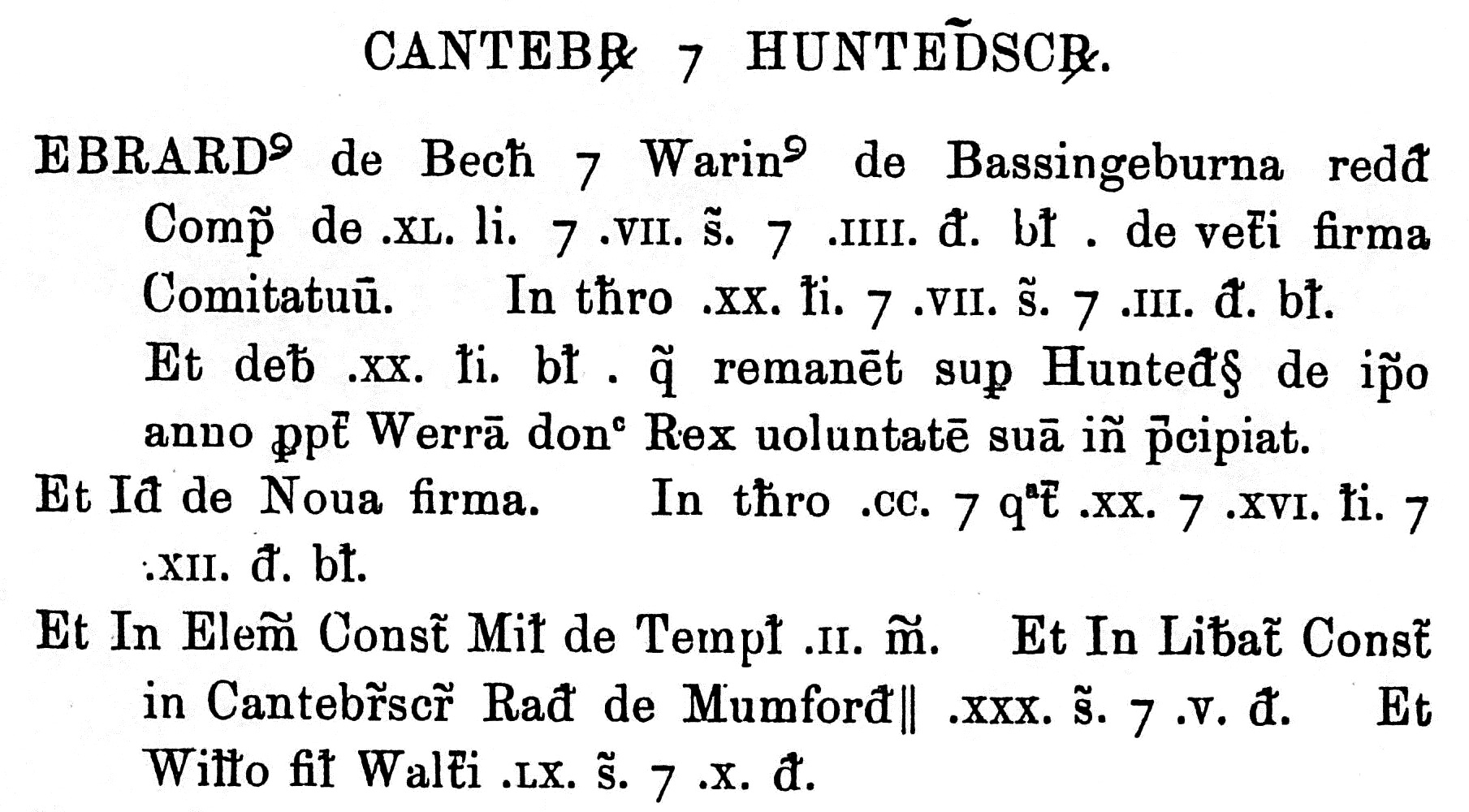
Extract from the Pipe Roll for 21 Henry II (1174–5), as published by the Pipe Roll Society in 1897 using record type

Record type is a family of typefaces designed to allow medieval manuscripts (specifically those from England) to be published as near-facsimiles of the originals. The typefaces include many special characters intended to replicate the various scribal abbreviations and other unusual glyphs typically found in such manuscripts. They were used in the publication of archival texts between 1774 and 1900.

== History ==
Record type was originally developed in the 1770s when plans were under way for the publication of Domesday Book. Early experiments in using special typefaces were not successful, but in 1773 the printer John Nichols designed a record type for an extract from Domesday to be included in John Hutchins' History and Antiquities of the County of Dorset (published in 1774). He was so pleased with the result that he and the co-editor of Domesday, Abraham Farley, persuaded the Treasury that the typeface should be adopted for the main Domesday project. It was consequently used in Farley's edition of Domesday Book, published in 1783. Nichols regarded the design as among his greatest achievements, stating that "on the correctness and beauty of this important Work, I am prepared to stake my typographical credit".

The original Domesday type was destroyed in the fire at Nichols' office in 1808, but a modified form of record type was widely used during the first half of the 19th century in the publications of the Record Commission. It was subsequently used in the publications of the Pipe Roll Society from 1884 until 1900; and in 1890 in a single volume published by the Selden Society (despite the misgivings of the society's founder, F. W. Maitland). The Selden Society's experiment was not repeated, and at a General Meeting held in 1903 the Pipe Roll Society decided to abandon record type in favour of publishing its texts "in extenso" (i.e. with all abbreviations extended).

== Legacy ==
Record type fell out of favour because its merits (primarily the fact that, given accurate transcription, the reader was presented with a faithful representation of what appeared on the manuscript page) were increasingly felt to be outweighed by its disadvantages: the high costs of typesetting and proofreading, and the challenges to the reader presented by a text prepared with minimal editorial intervention. Moreover, technical advances by the late 19th century meant that, in cases where there was a genuine argument for facsimile publication, this could be achieved more satisfactorily, cheaply and accurately by means of photozincography and other photographic printing techniques.

Paul Harvey regards record type as falling "badly between two stools, giving less than a facsimile on the one hand, less than an extended text on the other". Nevertheless, L. C. Hector has argued that the modest amount of rationalisation and standardisation required to set a manuscript in record type resulted in a "half-way stage towards the interpretation of the abbreviations" that remains a useful tool to assist the novice in medieval palaeography.

Charles Trice Martin's The Record Interpreter (first edition 1892; second edition 1910), which remains a standard handbook for the interpretation of English medieval manuscript texts, employs a version of record type to present abbreviated words.

A more recent example of a text printed in record type format – in practice, improvised from a variety of existing typographical characters – is an edition of the late 14th-century "Jubilee Book" of the City of London, from a 15th-century manuscript, published by the London Record Society in 2021. The choice is justified by the complexities of the linguistic evidence presented by the source text.

A continuing desire in the digital age to represent the special characters of medieval texts in typographical form is also demonstrated by the establishment in 2001 of the Medieval Unicode Font Initiative, which aims to coordinate the encoding and display of such characters.

== Sources ==
- Condon, M. M.; Hallam, E. (1984). "Government Printing of the Public Records in the Eighteenth Century". Journal of the Society of Archivists. 7 (6): 348–88. doi:10.1080/00379818409514252.
- Harvey, P. D. A. (2001). Editing Historical Records. London: British Library. pp. 47–50. ISBN 0-7123-4684-8.
- Hector, L. C. (1966). The Handwriting of English Documents (2nd ed.). London: Edward Arnold. pp. 35–6.
- Hunnisett, R. F. (1977). Editing Records for Publication. Archives and the User. Vol. 4. London: British Records Association. p. 24. ISBN 0-900222-05-0.
