= Noel Burtt =

New Zealand cricketer

Personal information
- Full name: Noel Vincent Burtt
- Born: 10 November 1911; Christchurch, New Zealand
- Died: 27 February 1983 (aged 71); Christchurch, New Zealand
- Batting: Right-handed
- Bowling: Right-arm leg-spin
- Relatives: Wayne Burtt (son); Tom Burtt (brother); Leighton Burtt (grandson)

Domestic team information
- Years: Team
- 1937/38–1948/49: Canterbury

Career statistics
Competition	First-class
Matches	9
Runs scored	59
Batting average	5.90
100s/50s	0/0
Top score	18
Balls bowled	1,515
Wickets	22
Bowling average	37.59
5 wickets in innings	0
10 wickets in match	0
Best bowling	4/69
Catches/stumpings	3/0
- Source: Cricinfo, 26 February 2018

Noel Vincent Burtt (10 November 1911 – 27 February 1983) was a cricketer who played nine matches of first-class cricket for Canterbury in New Zealand from 1937 to 1949.

Noel Burtt was a leg-spinner who spun the ball sharply and took about 500 wickets over 20 years for his club, Sydenham, in the Christchurch senior competition. However, he was only moderately successful in first-class cricket, and was unable to command a regular spot in the Canterbury team.

His brother Tom played Test cricket for New Zealand. Both of them played hockey for Canterbury, Tom also played hockey for New Zealand. Noel's son Wayne also played cricket for Canterbury. His nephew John Ward was a New Zealand Test wicket-keeper. His grandson Leighton Burtt played for Canterbury in first class, List A and Twenty20 formats.

Noel Burtt served in the New Zealand Artillery during the Second World War. In 1983, aged 71 and suffering from severe illness, he took his own life.
