= Wayne Burtt =

New Zealand cricketer (1944–2023)

Personal information
- Full name: John Wayne Burtt
- Born: 10 June 1944; Christchurch, New Zealand
- Died: 25 February 2023 (aged 78); Spreydon, Christchurch, New Zealand
- Nickname: Burtis
- Batting: Right-handed
- Bowling: Right-arm leg-spin
- Relatives: Noel Burtt (father); Tom Burtt (uncle); John Ward (cousin); Leighton Burtt (nephew)

Domestic team information
- Years: Team
- 1965/66–1972/73: Canterbury
- 1973/74–1974/75: Central Districts

Career statistics
| Competition | First-class | List A |
|---|---|---|
| Matches | 54 | 4 |
| Runs scored | 2,378 | 128 |
| Batting average | 28.30 | 32.00 |
| 100s/50s | 1/11 | 0/1 |
| Top score | 130* | 77 |
| Balls bowled | 2,616 | 0 |
| Wickets | 27 | – |
| Bowling average | 51.77 | – |
| 5 wickets in innings | 0 | – |
| 10 wickets in match | 0 | – |
| Best bowling | 4/49 | – |
| Catches/stumpings | 23/– | 0/– |
- Source: Cricinfo, 4 October 2024

John Wayne Burtt (11 June 1944 – 25 February 2023) was a New Zealand cricketer who played first-class cricket for Canterbury from 1966 to 1975.

Burtt's father, Noel Burtt, played first-class cricket for Canterbury, as did his uncle, Tom Burtt, who also played Test cricket. A stylish middle-order batsman and occasional leg-spin bowler, Wayne Burtt made his Plunket Shield debut in the fourth match of the 1965–66 season and was never out of the Canterbury side until he moved to Central Districts at the end of the 1972–73 season. In his first match for Canterbury he made 53 and took 4 for 49 as Central Districts hung on for a draw.

Burtt had his most productive season in 1967–68 when he scored 416 runs at an average of 46.22, including his only century, 130 not out against Wellington. Towards the end of the season he was selected to play for a New Zealand Cricket Council President's XI against the touring Indian team, scoring 33 and 71 in a low-scoring match.

Burtt was close to national selection for some years. He represented South Island twice in 1968–69 – in a trial match against North Island and against the touring West Indies team – but with only moderate success. He moved to Wanganui, and then New Plymouth, and spent two seasons with Central Districts in 1973–74 and 1974–75 but was less successful there than with Canterbury, and he retired after the 1974–75 season. He represented Taranaki in the Hawke Cup from 1974 to 1980.

Burtt died in the Christchurch suburb of Spreydon in February 2023, aged 78.
