= Publication of Domesday Book =

The text of Domesday Book, the record of the great survey of England completed in 1086 executed for William I of England, was first edited by Abraham Farley in the 1770s. The first facsimile edition of the manuscripts was made in a project led by the cartographer Henry James in the 1860s. An English translation of the Latin text for most counties was published by the Victoria County History (VCH) during much of the 20th century.

A new English translation of the entire text was prepared for the Phillimore Edition, published 1975–1992 for Phillimore & Co under the general editorship of John Morris. The Phillimore Edition is synoptic, placing its translation alongside a facsimile of Farley's edition, and is published in a separate volume for each county. The Phillimore translation did not, however supersede the VCH one as the most authoritative.

The Alecto Editions are a series of high-quality bibliophile facsimiles published 1985–1992, with a new English translation in two separate volumes. The Alecto editorial board produced a corrected and standardized translation based on the VCH text. Penguin Books reprinted the Alecto Editions translation in a single volume published in hardback in 2002 and in paperback in 2003.

A digital edition of manuscript facsimile images alongside the text of the Phillimore translation was published as the "Domesday Explorer" on CD-ROM in 2000, publicly accessible as an online database since 2008.

== Abraham Farley's edition (1773–1783) ==
Domesday Book was an item of great interest to the antiquarian movement of the 18th century. This was the age of the county history, with many accounts of the English shires being published at this time, and Domesday Book, as a property record of early date that happened to be arranged by county, was a major source for the medieval history of all the counties encompassed by the survey.

The reconstituted Society of Antiquaries of London, founded in 1717 by Humfrey Wanley, John Bagford and John Talman, made it part of its mission to work towards the publication of a wide variety of ancient records, including Domesday. The Society struggled to achieve its aims, however, being afflicted by its members' limited resources and sheer lack of enthusiasm.

Nevertheless, after the purchase of a Royal Charter in 1751, the possibility of publishing Domesday became more realistic. In 1756 Philip Carteret Webb read a paper to the Society emphasising the great value of Domesday Book, and by implication the urgent need for a published edition: this paper was printed by the printing press of William Bowyer. The following year, in response to Webb's request, members reported back to the Society regarding existing printed and MS transcripts from Domesday Book, with the intention of compiling material that might be of assistance in the task of compiling an edition. This effort did not bear fruit.

In 1767, however, for reasons that may be connected to this renewal of interest in Domesday Book, plans were set in motion for the publication of a complete, scholarly edition of Domesday: this coincided with a programme of publication of other public records, including the Parliament Rolls.

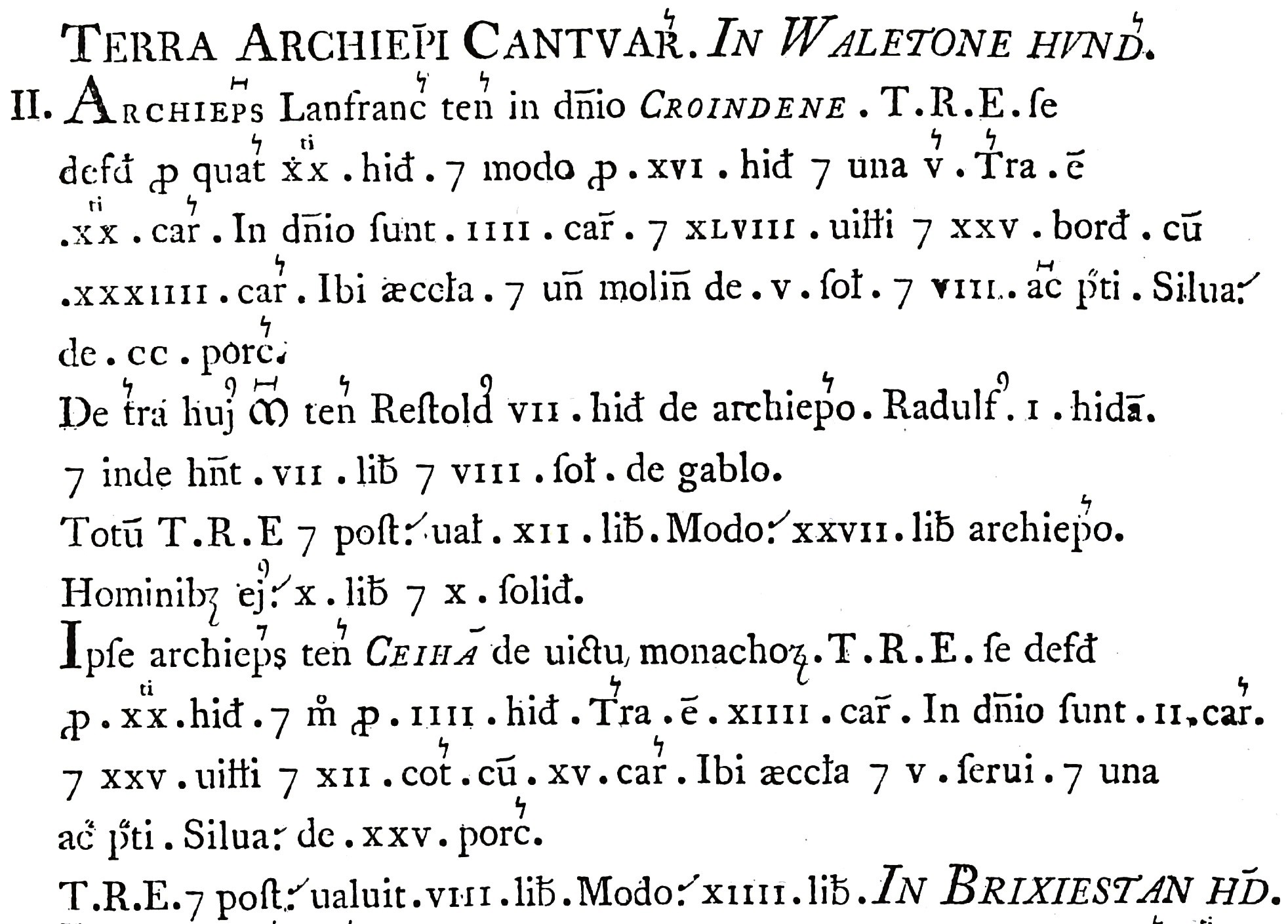
Entries for Croydon and Cheam, Surrey, in Farley's edition of Domesday Book

In March 1767 Charles Morton (1716–1799), a librarian at the British Museum, was put in charge of the scheme; a fact which caused resentment towards him from Abraham Farley, a deputy chamberlain of the Exchequer who for many years had controlled access to Domesday Book in its repository at the Chapter House, Westminster, and furthermore had been involved in the recent Parliament Rolls printing operation. In 1768 Farley complained to the Treasury that he, not Morton, should be in charge of the project, while Morton, for his part, complained that he was being obstructed in his work by the staff at the Chapter House.

The government, meanwhile, had become concerned at the spiralling cost estimates – Morton indicated in 1770 that to continue would cost £4,525 on top of the £2,810 he had already spent. At this point, Farley was remembered, and he became co-editor of the work. Farley and Morton's rivalry precluded an enduring, constructive relationship, and after 1774 Farley was effectively in sole charge.

Farley pursued the task with a single-minded devotion born of long involvement with the public records, and Domesday Book in particular. One of his closest associates during the project was the printer John Nichols, inheritor of William Bowyer's London printing press, who in 1773 had developed the special "record type" typeface that was used in the published edition to represent as closely as possible the script in Domesday Book itself. Ultimately, Farley's edition of Domesday was completed by 15 March 1783.

Although of a high standard, Farley's work lacked supplementary material and indices. In 1800, therefore, the Record Commission ordered the printing of indexes to Farley's work. These were compiled under the direction of Sir Henry Ellis and published in 1816, together with an edition of four "satellite surveys" – the Exon Domesday, the Liber Winton, the Inquisitio Eliensis and the Boldon Book.

== The photozincographic edition (1861–1863) ==
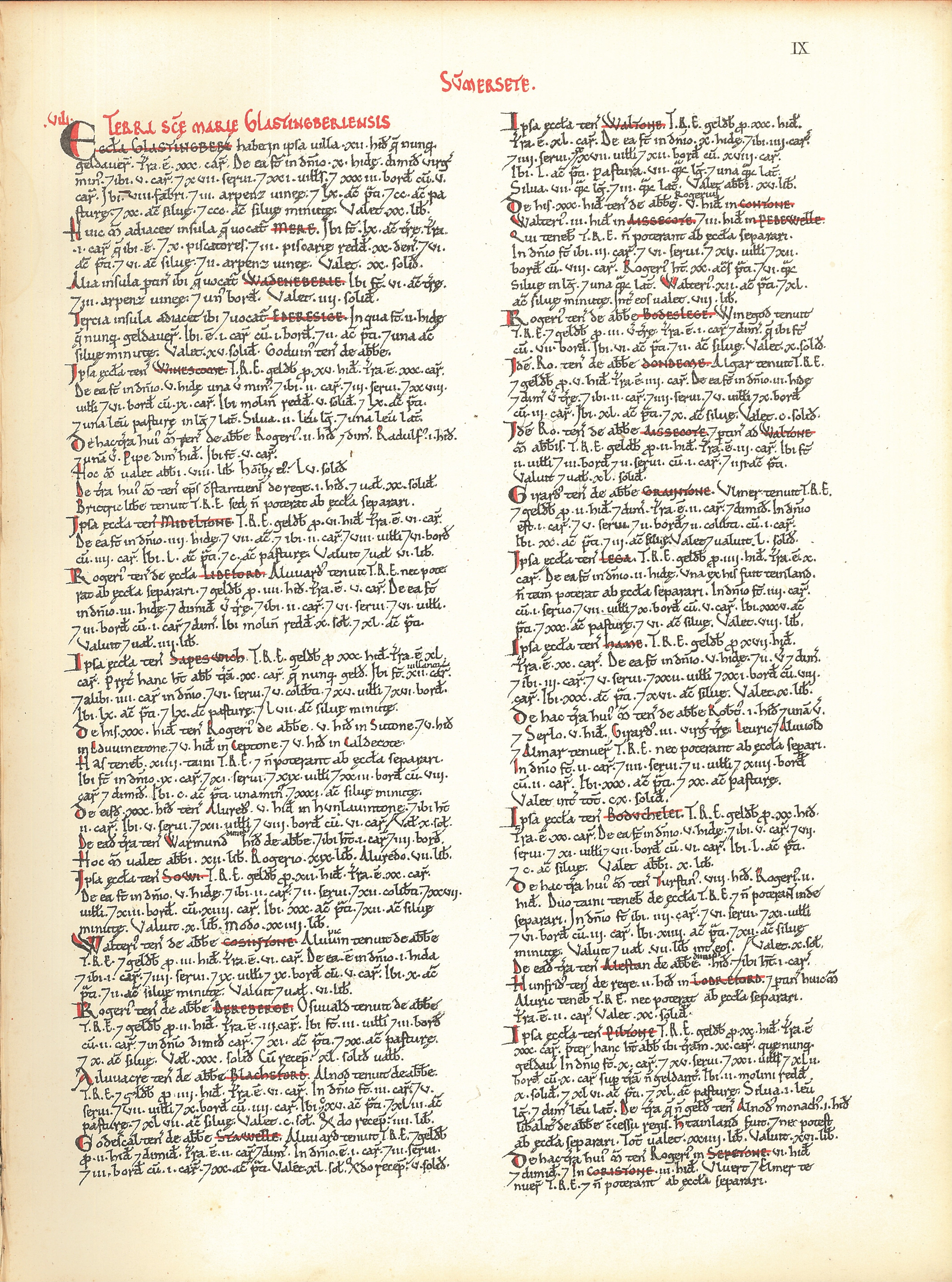
A page from the photozincographic edition of Domesday Book for Somersetshire (published in 1862), showing entries for some of the landholdings of Glastonbury Abbey

The circulation of Farley's edition was too limited to expand significantly public access to the Domesday Book. That was to take place only in 1861, with the production of the first photozincographic facsimile edition of Domesday.

The driving force behind the project was Colonel Henry James, the Director General at the Ordnance Survey. The process involved the transferring of a photograph onto zinc or stone, which could then be used directly for printing or, alternatively, onto the waxed surface of a copper plate where the image formed a guide for engraving. It was a system that enabled facsimile reproduction en masse and thus, following a meeting with William Ewart Gladstone in 1859, in which James was allegedly asked by the then-Chancellor of the Exchequer, whether he "knew of any process by which some of our ancient manuscripts in the Record Office could be copied", James emphasised the superiority of this process over other reproductions, such as lithography, which used heavy and brittle stone blocks and claimed that the process would be ideal for making cheap facsimile copies of Domesday Book.

In a letter to the assistant Secretary to the Treasury, George Hamilton in October 1860, James outlined the cost of a complete reproduction of Domesday Book as an estimated £1575 for 500 copies, or £3. 3s. per copy. James further outlined the cost of a single county to demonstrate the affordability of the process, using Cornwall as an example of one of the shorter entries in the volumes (eleven folio pages) and estimating the cost of 500 copies to be £11. 2s. 4d (i.e. 5⅓ d per copy). On 14 January 1861, James was granted permission to photo-zincograph the Cornwall fragment of Domesday Book as a Treasury-funded experiment to determine the success of the process and, consequently, by 1863 the Ordnance Survey had photozincographed Domesday Book in its entirety, publishing it in 32 county volumes. Two colours (red and black) were used, replicating those used in the original manuscript.

The general public were excited about the invention of photozincography. Newspapers such as the Photographic News reported on the events surrounding the invention and even supplied their readers with an example of a document which had undergone the process.

== English translations ==
=== Victoria County History (1900–1969) ===
The Victoria County History (VCH) was founded in 1899 as a project to publish an encyclopaedic history of each of the historic counties of England to a uniform plan. From the outset, it was intended that this plan should include English translations of the relevant county sections of the Domesday Book, with a scholarly introduction and a map.

J. H. Round was appointed editor for the Domesday sections. He translated the texts and wrote the introductions for Hampshire (published 1900), Worcestershire (1901), Northamptonshire (1902), and Essex (1903); wrote the introductions for Hertfordshire (1902), Surrey (1902), Bedfordshire (1904), Warwickshire (1904), Buckinghamshire (1905), Somerset (1906), Berkshire (1907), and Herefordshire (1908), though the translations were by others; and he oversaw work on Cumberland (by J. Wilson, published 1901), Derbyshire (by Frank Stenton, published 1905), Sussex (by L. F. Salzman, published 1905), Devon (by O. J. Reichel, published 1906), Lancashire (by William Farrer, published 1906), Norfolk (by Charles Johnson, published 1906), Nottinghamshire (by Frank Stenton, published 1906), Leicestershire (by Frank Stenton, published 1907), Rutland (by Frank Stenton, published 1908), and Shropshire (translation by C. H. Drinkwater, introduction by James Tait, published 1908). Round also began a translation of Domesday for Lincolnshire, but this remained unfinished.

Round retired from the project in 1908, but the VCH subsequently published translations of Domesday for Suffolk (translation anonymous, introduction by B. A. Lees, published 1911); Yorkshire (by William Farrer, published 1912); Cornwall (translation by T. Taylor, introduction by L. F. Salzman, published 1924); Huntingdonshire (by Frank Stenton, published 1926); Kent (translation by F. W. Ragg, introduction by N. Neilson, published 1932); Cambridgeshire (translation by J. Otway-Ruthven, introduction by L. F. Salzman, published 1938); Oxfordshire (by Frank Stenton, published 1939); Wiltshire (by R. R. Darlington, published 1955); Staffordshire (by C. F. Slade, published 1958); Dorset (translation by A. Williams, introduction by Ralph Pugh, published 1968); and Middlesex (by T. G. Pinder, published 1969).

Independently of the VCH, translations were published for Cheshire by James Tait for the Chetham Society in 1916; for Lincolnshire by C. W. Foster and T. Longley for the Lincoln Record Society in 1924 (reprinted 1976); for the East Riding of Yorkshire by A. B. Wilson-Barkworth in 1925; and for Staffordshire by H. M. Fraser in 1936. This left only Gloucestershire without a published 20th-century translation.

=== The Phillimore Edition (1975–1992) ===
The Phillimore Edition is a parallel-text Latin and English edition of Great Domesday Book, published by the local-history specialist publishers Phillimore & Co under the general editorship of John Morris. Each county occupies a separate volume. The first volumes to appear were those for Middlesex, Surrey and Huntingdonshire, all in 1975; and the last those for Lincolnshire, Yorkshire (both counties occupying 2 volumes each), Shropshire, and Suffolk, all of which were published in 1986.

The Latin text, printed on the left-hand pages, is a facsimile of Farley's edition; the translation, on the right-hand pages, was prepared by a team of volunteers, who (to ensure uniformity) worked within standardised guidelines for syntax, punctuation and the rendering of proper names and technical terms. Each volume includes notes, tables of tenants' names and place-names, and a map.

Uniform with the edition, a one-volume Guide to Domesday Book by Rex Welldon Finn was published in 1973. A 3-volume set of indexes was published in 1992.

Although the Phillimore edition rapidly became the most readily accessible and widely used version of Domesday Book, scholars criticised the translation for oversimplifying complex historical concepts: David Bates, for example, described it as "unconvincingly and unhelpfully 'modern'".

== The Alecto Editions (1985–1992) ==
Alecto Millennium Edition binding

Published between 1985 and 1992, the Alecto Edition is the most complete facsimile of Domesday Book to date. There are three types of Alecto edition, the "Penny Edition", the Millennium Edition and the Domesday Book Studies edition. It has been called an "indecently exact facsimile" by Professor Geoffrey Martin, then Keeper of Public Records and custodian of the original Domesday.

This edition was accompanied by a volume of indices, a two-volume English translation and a box set of Ordnance Survey Maps with the Domesday sites overlaid on the modern maps.

=== Facsimile ===
In order to produce this extremely high quality reproduction, the original Domesday Book was unbound to allow each page to be photographed. The camera used for this process was the same size as a Ford Fiesta, and for security reasons was only operated in a sealed cage.

The Penny Edition was printed on a specialist paper made from cotton from the American Deep South to give something of the same weight and feel as the parchment of the original. These pages were then bound between sheets of 15th-century oak set with a silver penny of William I and another 1986 Elizabeth II penny minted specially for the occasion. Because of the vast expense involved each copy of the Penny Edition cost £5750 and only 250 were produced. The later Millennium Edition used the same high quality images and paper was bound into two volumes of calfskin in the style of the 12th-century binding. This edition was limited to 450 copies at a cost of £6750 for Greater Domesday and £5750 for Little Domesday.

The Library Version of Domesday used the same paper as the Penny and Millennium versions but was bound in a linen cover and boxed to provide durability. This edition came with indices, translations and maps.

=== Translation ===
Cover of Penguin Edition (UK)

The Alecto Historical Editions translation, published in two companion volumes to the facsimile, was intended to supersede the VCH translation, which, although of high quality, suffers from inconsistencies due to its publication history being spread out over more than 80 years. The editorial board, consisting of Ann Williams (editor-in-chief), G. H. Martin (general editor), J. C. Holt, Henry R. Loyn, Elizabeth Hallam-Smith (Assistant Keeper of Public Records), and Sarah Tyacke (Keeper of Public Records, the National Archives) produced a rigorously standardized and corrected translation based on the VCH text.

Penguin Books reproduced the Alecto translation in a single volume, published in 2002 in hardback and in 2003 in paperback, with an introduction by G. H. Martin. It is the first edition to omit the Latin text entirely, and the first single-volume edition of the translated text. The paperback was originally priced at £25.

== Digital editions ==
The Domesday Explorer

Screen shot of the Domesday Explorer

The Domesday Explorer was developed by John Palmer of University of Hull and his son Matthew Palmer as a private project beginning 1986 and using Microsoft Access, later turned into a publicly funded project, receiving a grant of £250,000 from the British Arts and Humanities Research Council. It was published on CD-ROM in 2000, and eventually made publicly accessible online by the University of Essex in 2008. The database includes high-resolution manuscript images, the text of the Phillimore translation (ed. John Morris), geographic information for interactive mapping of searches, stock charts of all reported livestock and statistics reports on each county of the survey. These were produced by Palmer using the work of previous Domesday experts such as Ellis, Maitland and Finn.

Commercial copies

There are two main suppliers of commercial copies of Domesday,

- The National Archives in London (nationalarchives.gov.uk), providing a PDF file of any page of Domesday Book for a fee.
- Domesdayextracts.co.uk, offering six-page extracts of the book for any town or village named.]
- The Prosopography of Anglo-Saxon England (PASE) contains all entries within the Domesday Book, including 1066 holders and tenants and post 1086 holders and tenants.
- Open Domesday by Anna Powell-Smith

== See also ==
- Photozincography of Domesday Book
