= Charles Morton (librarian) =

English medical doctor and librarian

- Born: 10 September 1716
- Died: 10 February 1799 (aged 82)
- Education: Leiden University
- Occupation: Librarian

Charles Morton MD (1716–1799) was an English medical doctor and librarian who became the principal librarian of the British Museum.

== Early life ==
Morton first attended Leiden University from 18 September 1736. Some time before 1745, he moved to Kendal, Westmoreland, where he practiced as a physician. He then practiced in London for several years, and on 19 April 1750 he was elected physician to the Middlesex Hospital. He was admitted licentiate of the College of Physicians on 1 April 1751.

== Career ==
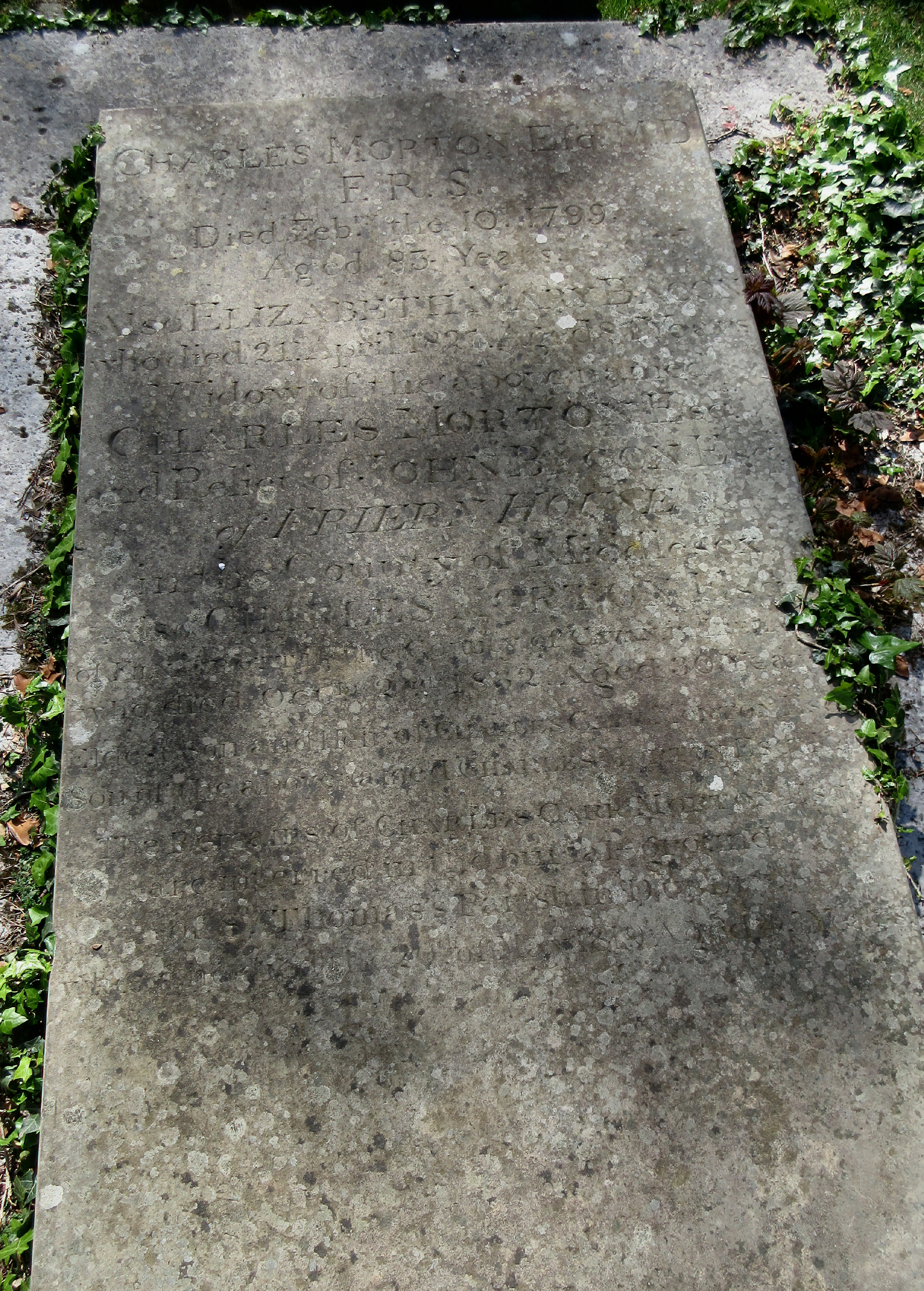
Tomb in Holly Road Garden of Rest

He was elected a Fellow of the Royal Society on 16 January 1752 and was secretary of the Royal Society from 1760 to 1774. He was also a member of the Academy of St Petersburg.

In 1754 also became physician to the Foundling Hospital. In June 1754, Lady Vere, wife of Vere Beauclerk, wrote a letter of recommendation for Morton to temporarily replace Dr. Conyers, who had recently resigned. The recommendation was followed through in July 1754 when he was appointed to attend for the time being.

By 1756, he was appointed under librarian of the British Museum. At the British Museum, Morton was initially a medical under-librarian in charge of manuscripts in the Cotton, Harley, Sloane, and Royal collections. On the death of Matthew Maty in 1776, Morton was appointed principal librarian and held the office till his death. Morton was a member of the American Philosophical Society, elected in 1771.

Morton died on 10 February 1799 and was buried in Holly Road Garden of Rest, Twickenham.

== Marriages ==
Charles Morton was married three, or possibly four times; he married into the minor aristocracy. The identity of his son Charles Carr Morton's mother is not clear. Although Charles Carr Morton's mother is listed as Elizabeth Pratt in Burke's Landed Gentry 1852 (Morton of Kilnacrott), this is a conventional impossibility, as shown by the sequence of known events.

Marriage to Mary Berkeley

Morton first married Miss Mary Berkeley, niece of Lady Betty Germaine and granddaughter of Charles Berkeley, 2nd Earl of Berkeley, on 13 September 1744. at Kendal. They had one known child, Elizabeth Morton, born on 26 May 1745 also at Kendal. Her descendants, through James Dansie, have been tracked as descendants of the blood royal, on account of Mary Berkeley's ancestry.

Elizabeth Morton married James Dansie, and they were the parents of Mary Dansie, who married John Freeman in 1798 and Elizabeth Dansie who married Richard Barneby.

According to the 1812 edition of Collins' Peerage, page 622, Mary Berkeley died on 10 March 1755. (Note: A different Mary Berkeley died in 1768 and subsequently was buried at Twickenham on 6 October 1768.)

Marriage to Mary Pratt

Charles Morton's second known marriage, to Lady Savile (born Mary Pratt), took place on 25 August 1767 at St George Bloomsbury in London across the street from the British Museum where he was employed. Morton's marriage date is often misidentified as 1772 but the Records of the Lumleys of Lumley Castle indicates Lady Savile was married to Captain Wallace in May 1744 and the marriage record at St George Bloomsbury identifies Mary Wallace as the Charles Morton's bride on 25 August 1767. Her mother, Honoretta Brooks Pratt, was the first cremated individual in England when she died on 26 September 1769, and Lady Savile's father, John Pratt, was the Vice Treasurer of Ireland.

Lady Savile was 61 years old in 1767, and this was her third marriage. Her first marriage was to Sir George Savile, 7th Baronet on 19 December 1722 By this union she was mother to two daughters and one son: Arabella Savile, who married John Thornhay Hewet on 23 July 1744; and Barbara Savile, who married Richard Lumley, 1st Earl of Scarbrough on 26 December 1752; and Sir George Savile, 8th Baronet. Lady Savile's second marriage to Captain Wallace took place 8 months after George Savile died on 17 September 1743. Lady Savile died on 14 February 1791.

Morton lived at Twickenham in the former home of Elizabeth Montagu, called Montagu House prior to his acquiring it and being termed Savile House thereafter. Lady Savile, at the age of 61, was too old to be the mother of Charles Carr Morton after she married Morton.

Marriage to Elizabeth Pratt

Charles Morton's third known marriage was to Elizabeth Pratt, who is said to have been age 35 at the time, also took place at St George Bloomsbury, on 25 April 1791, one month and two weeks after Lady Savile died. Elizabeth Pratt was the daughter of Reverend Joseph Pratt and a near relation to Lady Savile. As such, she lived in the same household as Morton and his wife Mary Pratt from as early as 6 January 1778. This is evidenced both her wedding announcement in the Gentleman's Magazine, and also by the summary of a letter now in the Nottinghamshire Archives, which states: "Note from Eliza Pratt sending Lady Savile's compliments to Mr. Hewett and that she will be much obliged to him if he invites Dr. Morton to dine at Grosvenor St. next Saturday."

== Family ==
Charles Morton had 14 grandchildren by his son Charles Carr Morton. In a document at the Nottinghamshire Archives, Eliza Pratt writes: "...Dr. Morton intends putting him to Mr. Angelo's to ride and fence but he is not to go into the guards" which seems to indicate that Charles Carr Morton was anywhere from 16 to 18 years old in 1779, having been born around 1761–1763, six years after Mary Berkeley died, but four years prior to his marriage to Lady Savile.

Burke's Landed Gentry identifies Elizabeth Pratt as Charles Carr Morton's mother. It is said that Elizabeth Pratt was 35 years old when she married Charles Morton in 1791, and therefore old enough to have been Charles Carr Morton's mother. However, Charles Carr Morton was married only 8 years after Elizabeth Pratt's marriage to Morton.

On 1 May 1799 Charles Carr Morton married Charlotte Tatlow at Drumora Lodge in County Cavan, Ireland. By 5 January 1800, Charles Carr Morton was father to his first child Anna.

== Publications ==
On 30 August 1748, Morton presented his doctoral dissertation about the whooping cough entitled De Tussi Convulsiva written entirely in Latin. In March 1767, Morton was put in charge of the publishing the Domesday Book of 1086; a fact which caused resentment towards him from Abraham Farley, a deputy chamberlain of the Exchequer who for many years had controlled access to the Domesday Book in its then repository at the Chapter House, Westminster, and furthermore had been involved in the recent Parliament Rolls printing operation. In 1768 Farley complained to the Treasury that he, not Morton, should be in charge of the project, while Morton, for his part, complained that he was being obstructed in his work by the staff at the Chapter House. Abraham Farley took over the project and published a new edition in 1783.

Morton produced two large publications during his tenure at the Museum, both related to the activities of Sir Bulstrode Whitelocke including his Journal of the Swedish Embassy and Notes Upon the King's Writt.

In 1759, Morton wrote a series of articles in the London Magazine about how annuities should properly be calculated, first appearing on page 251, debated further on page 286 and answered by Morton on page 425.
