= Joseph Burtt =

Joseph Burtt (17 November 1818 – 17 December 1876) was an archivist and an Assistant Keeper of the Public Records.

== Biography ==
Burtt began working in the public service in 1832 at the Chapter House in Westminster Abbey under Sir Francis Palgrave, and in 1840 became a member of staff at the Public Record Office. Having been appointed an Assistant Keeper of the Records of the Second Class in 1851, Burtt was appointed to first-class status in 1859, and held this position until his death. Burtt oversaw the moving of the Public Records from the Chapter House to a newly designated repository in Fetter Lane, and organised their cataloguing.

He was appointed to oversee the transport and safety of the Domesday Book on its journeys to Southampton between 1861 and 1864 to be photozincographed by Colonel Sir Henry James at the offices of the Ordnance Survey, and assisted James in some aspects of the task.

Later in life Burtt became a notable figure in British archaeology, becoming secretary of the Royal Archaeological Institute in 1862, also contributing to the Gentleman's Magazine and The Athenaeum, amongst others. Burtt died as a result of illness at his home in Tulse Hill, London, on 17 December 1876.
