= Tom Burtt =

New Zealand cricketer (1915–1988)

- The New Zealand Test team, Christchurch, March 1947. Tom Burtt is on the right at the top.

Personal information
- Born: 22 January 1915; Christchurch, Canterbury, New Zealand
- Died: 28 May 1988 (aged 73); Christchurch, New Zealand
- Batting: Right-handed
- Bowling: Slow left-arm orthodox

International information
- National side: New Zealand (1947–1953)
- Test debut (cap 40): 21 March 1947 v England
- Last Test: 6 March 1953 v South Africa

Career statistics
Competition	Test	First-class
Matches	10	84
Runs scored	252	1,644
Batting average	21.00	17.30
100s/50s	0/0	0/4
Top score	42	68*
Balls bowled	2,593	23,423
Wickets	33	408
Bowling average	35.45	22.19
5 wickets in innings	3	29
10 wickets in match	0	5
Best bowling	6/162	8/35
Catches/stumpings	2/–	53/–
- Source: Cricinfo, 1 April 2017

Thomas Browning Burtt (22 January 1915 – 24 May 1988) was a New Zealand cricketer who played in ten Tests from 1947 to 1953.

== Domestic career ==
In his last first-class match, for Canterbury against the MCC in 1954–55, he hit 24 off one over from Johnny Wardle.

In first-class cricket, he played 84 games, mostly for Canterbury, between 1943 and 1955, taking 408 wickets at 22.19. His brother Noel also played for Canterbury, as did his nephew Wayne Burtt and great-nephew Leighton Burtt.

In 1937 and 1938 he also represented New Zealand at hockey.

== Later life and death ==
He played ten consecutive Tests over six years, bowling long spells, taking wickets, and scoring useful runs in the tail, until he was dropped after the First Test against South Africa in 1952–53. According to Richard Boock in his biography of Bert Sutcliffe, Burtt was one of several players at the time who "paid the ultimate price for being overweight". He was overlooked for the next season's tour of South Africa, the inexperienced spinners Eric Dempster, Matt Poore and Bill Bell going instead, and did not play another Test.

His 128 first-class wickets taken on the 1949 tour of England is a record for New Zealand. In Wisden, Charles Bray said of him, "The bulk of the bowling fell on the tubby, cheerful T.B. Burtt, slow left-arm, immaculate length, good flight, who attacked the off-stump so accurately that he constantly tied down the opposing batsmen."

== Outside cricket ==
Burtt worked as a company manager for Lace Webb Textiles.

At the 1956 local elections he was elected a member of the Christchurch City Council on the Citizens' Association ticket. He served for one term, not standing for re-election.

He died in 1988.
