= Abraham Farley =

English government official

Abraham Farley (c.1712–1791) was an English government official who was the custodian of Domesday Book.

Farley was appointed Deputy Chamberlain of the Exchequer in 1736 and became responsible for the public records held in the Chapter House of Westminster Abbey. First among these was Domesday Book, of which Farley became custodian, granting visiting antiquaries access to make transcripts for a fee. In 1753, he was approached by Philip Carteret Webb to make a transcript from Domesday Book; this he did, and, perhaps in return for Webb's help in raising awareness of Domesday's importance, waived the usual fee. Two years later, Webb's paper on Domesday Book was read to the Society of Antiquaries of London.

In later life, Farley was to produce the first printed edition of Domesday Book, for which there was then a considerable demand. Following a Parliamentary order in 1767, Farley was appointed co-editor of the Domesday printing project in 1770, alongside Charles Morton of the British Museum. In his Literary Anecdotes of the Eighteenth Century, the printer John Nichols remarked that Morton and Farley's relationship was characterised by rivalry and mistrust. Farley, whom Nichols called "of all men the properest person for so important a trust", due to his "long and intimate acquaintance with the original record", evidently considered himself best fitted to produce the landmark work. Farley eventually cut Morton out altogether, pressing ahead with the work with Nichols' co-operation. Farley received payment to the tune of £2,500 for his services.

Farley died in early in 1791: he made his will on 21 January, and probate was granted on 22 March.

== See also ==
- Publication of Domesday Book
