= Leighton Burtt =

New Zealand cricketer (born 1984)

Leighton McGregor Burtt (born 17 April 1984) is a New Zealand cricketer, who played for the New Zealand Under 19 team and Canterbury Wizards. He was born in Christchurch. He is the great-nephew of Tom Burtt, grandson of Noel Burtt, nephew of Wayne Burtt and is the son of Mark Burtt who played hockey for New Zealand. Mark and Wayne's cousin John Ward was a Canterbury and New Zealand wicketkeeper. His mother Vicki Burtt played cricket for Canterbury and New Zealand also. He was also contracted to the Wellington Firebirds.
