= Photozincography =

Method for accurately reproducing images and texts

Photozincography, sometimes referred to as heliozincography but essentially the same process, known commercially as zinco, is the photographic process developed by Sir Henry James (1803–1877) in the mid-nineteenth century.

This method enabled the accurate reproduction of images, manuscript text and outline engravings, which proved invaluable when originally used to create maps during the Ordnance Survey of Great Britain during the 1850s, carried out by the government's Topographical Department, headed by Colonel Sir Henry James.

== Basis ==
The foundation of this method is the insolubility of potassium dichromate upon exposure to light, allowing the printing of images onto zinc from photographic negatives.

== Method ==
First a high-contrast negative was made using the wet plate collodion method (a solution of nitrocellulose in ether or acetone on glass). The next step required coating a sheet of thin tracing paper with a mixture of saturated potassium bichromate solution and gum water. Once dried it was placed under the photographic negative and exposed to light for 2–3 minutes. The bichromate/gum mixture remained soluble on the parts of the tracing paper that were shielded from light by the opaque areas of the negative, allowing it to be removed, leaving an insoluble ‘positive’ image. This bichromate positive was then placed on a sheet of zinc covered in lithographic ink, and put through a printing press three or four times. After removal of the paper, the zinc plate was washed in a tray of hot water (containing a small amount of gum), using a camel-hair brush to remove all the soluble bichromate combined with ink. What remained on the zinc plate was a perfect representation in ink of the original composition, by virtue of the ink binding to the insoluble potassium bichromate.

The main advantage and innovation of this process over lithography was the use of zinc plates rather than stone ones. Zinc plates were lighter and easier to transport, could produce more prints, and were far less brittle than the stone plates originally used. The use of zinc plates was also the origin of the name photozincography, which Sir Henry James claims to have invented.

== History ==
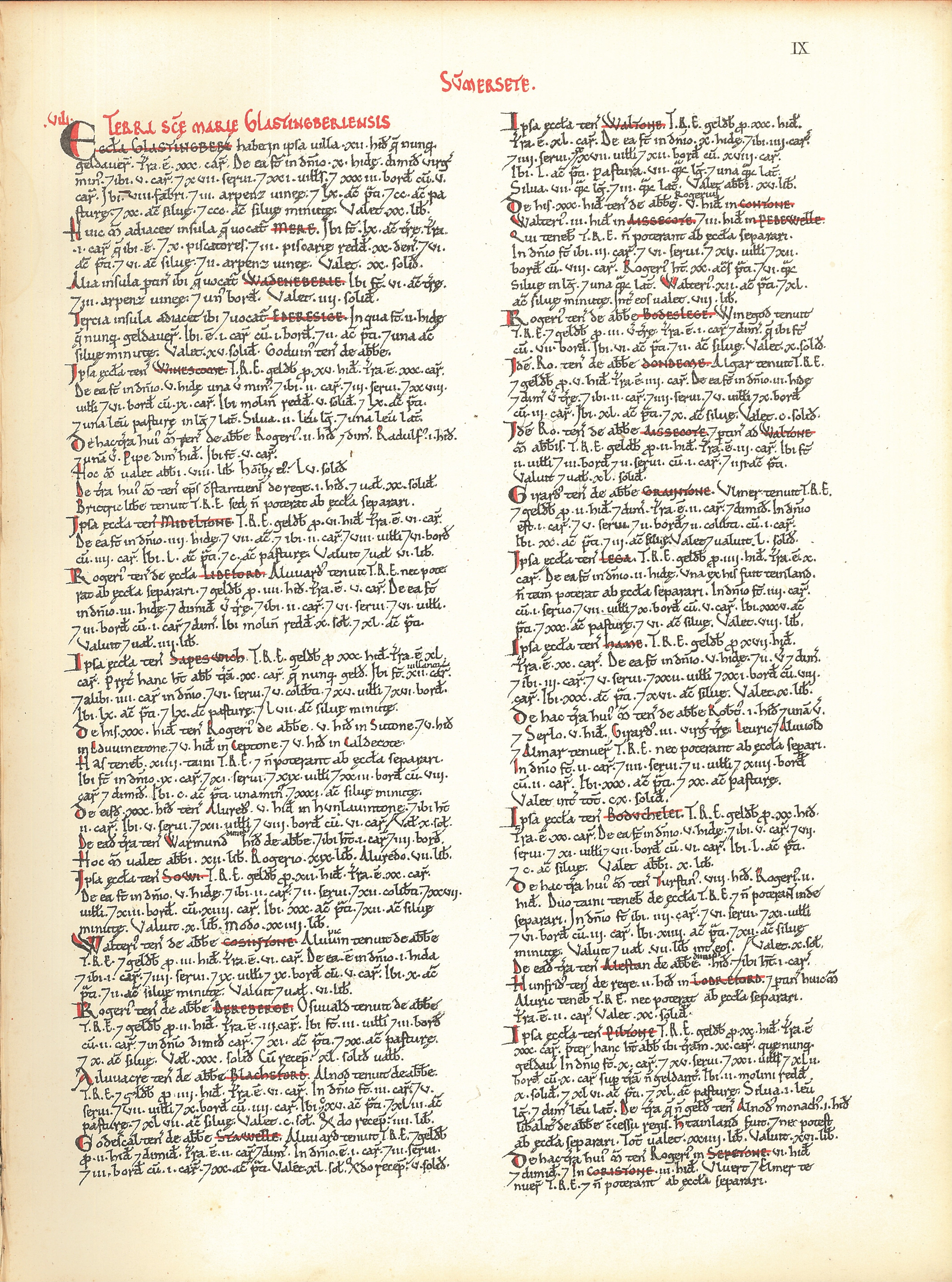
A page from the photozincographic edition of Domesday Book for Somersetshire (published by the Ordnance Survey in 1862), showing entries for some of the landholdings of Glastonbury Abbey

Zinco or photozincography developed at the Ordnance Survey out of a need to reduce large-scale maps more effectively. The original method using a pantograph, was overcomplicated, time-consuming and, due to the number of moving parts, inaccurate. While there was some concern that photography would distort the image, Sir Henry set out to explore the possibility of using photography, setting up a photography department at the Ordnance Survey in 1855 and also securing funds to build the "glasshouse", a photography building with an all glass roof to allow as much natural light in as possible for photography. The development and discovery of photozincography or zinco came about four years later, being first mentioned in Sir Henry's report to Parliament in 1859.

While Sir Henry James claimed to have invented the process, a similar system of document copying had been developed in Australia. John Walter Osborne (1828–1902) developed a similar process and for the same reasons as Sir Henry, to avoid using the tracing system of the pantograph. While developed at the same time Sir Henry's process, however as Sir Henry explained to a representative of Mr. Osborne in the quote below, he publicized it first.

I therefore handed this gentleman a copy of my Report, and desired him to read the account given of our process at page 6 of that Report, and to examine the copy of the Deed bound up with it, and not to show me the description of Mr. Osborne's process if it was differed from ours. After reading it, he said at once it was the same process, and I then told him it was useless for him to attempt to take out a patent as my printed Report had everywhere been circulated

Sir Henry, despite being the person who oversaw and set up the photography department, was not the actual inventor. The head of the photography department at Southampton, Captain A. de C. Scott, did much of the ground work and basic development on photozincography. Sir Henry did acknowledge the work of Scott in the development and use of the system in the introduction to the photozincographied Domesday Book. Despite this it was Sir Henry who gained most of the public attention through his pamphlet on photozincography. He was knighted in 1861 for services to science.

The use of photozincography at the Ordnance Survey was a great success, with Sir Henry claiming it saved over £2000 a year, from the invention of photo-zincography; the cost of producing a map of a rural district was reduced from 4 to 1 and maps of towns were reduced from 9 to 1. It was also claimed that up to 2000 or 3000 impressions could be taken from a single plate. Despite this, the process was not perfect: it did not reproduce a full colour picture, and until 1875 boys were employed to colour in the maps produced by this method. The process, while better than the pantograph, still required a large amount of labour to prepare the zinc plates for pressing. However, photozincography began to be used fairly rapidly in Europe. Sir Henry was even honoured by the Queen of Spain. Though originally developed to reproduce maps, the process was eventually to be used on a whole series of manuscripts, to preserve them and make them more available to the public. This included a reproduction of Domesday Book in 1861–64 and several volumes of historical manuscripts. Whilst the process of photo-zincography was invented mostly for use the Ordnance Survey, The Photographic News suggested that the process could also be used in the Patent Office and would save vast amounts of time and money. The use of photozincography began to decline in the 1880s as better methods of reproductions were made available and in the 1900s the glasshouse was pulled down to make way for new printing presses.

== Gallery ==
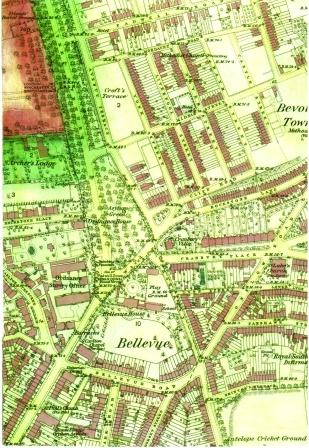
An 1865 map showing the photography building and the Ordnance Survey offices

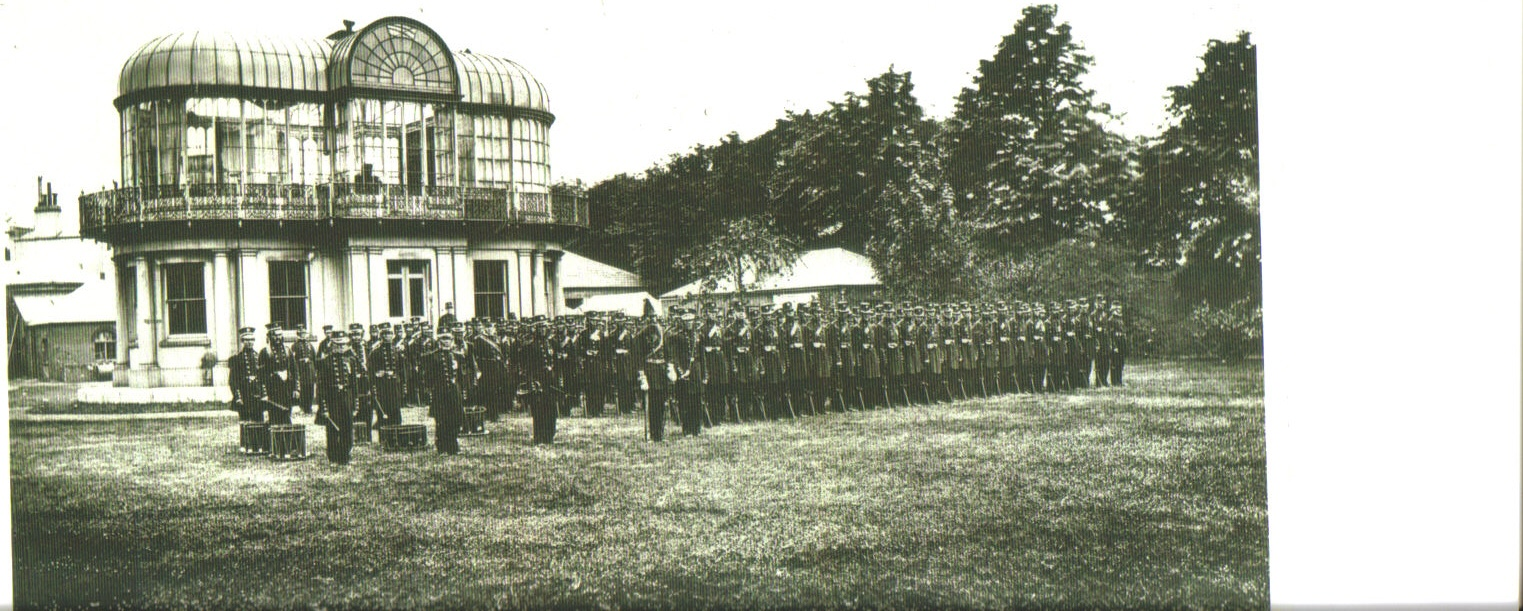
The photography building and Henry James

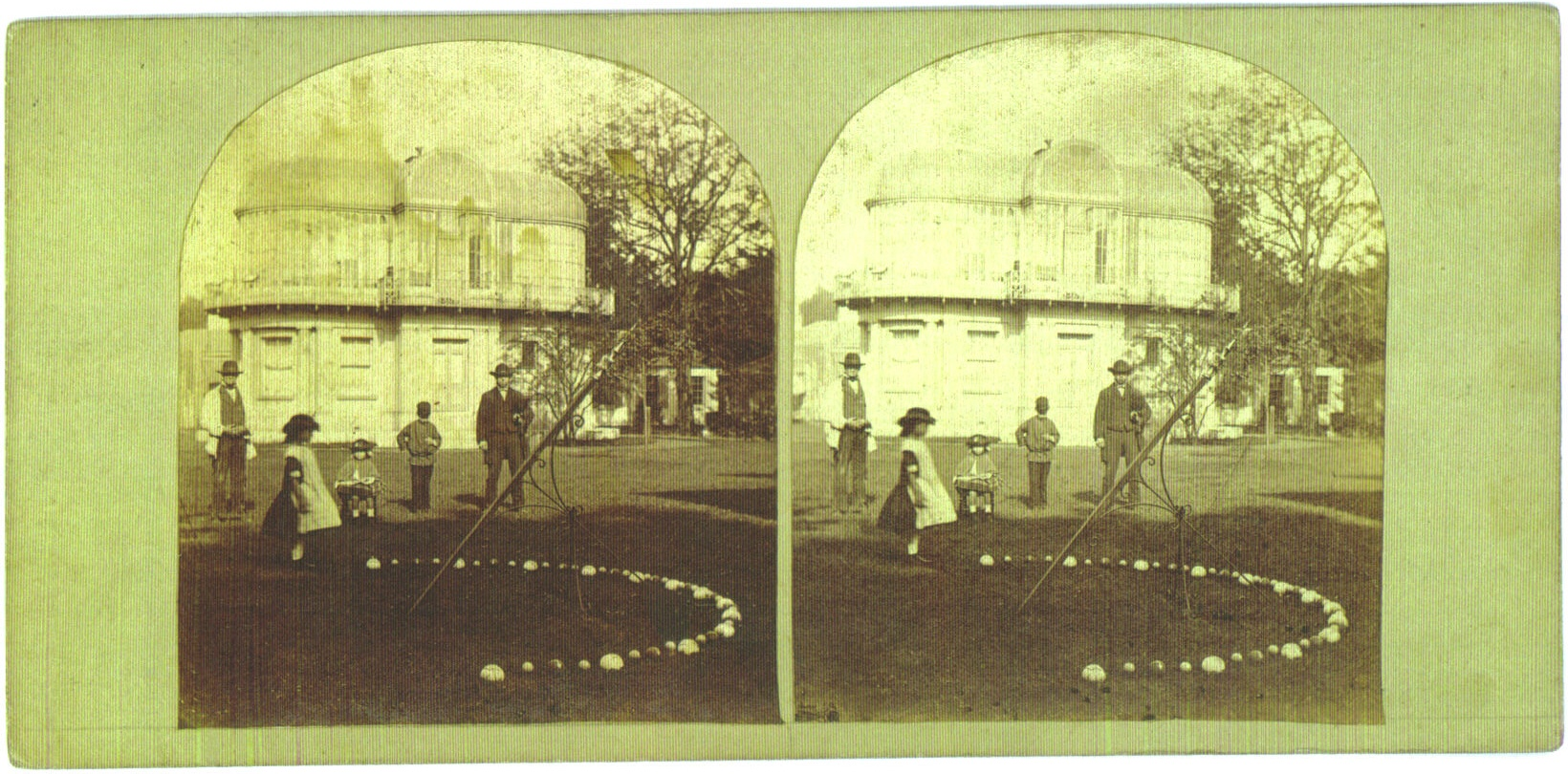
A picture showing the photozincography building

== See also ==
- Anastatic lithography
- Photography
- Gum bichromate
