= Sarah Tyacke =

English cartographer and librarian, born 1945

Sarah Tyacke CB FSA FRHistS FRGS
- Born: Sarah Jacqueline Jeacock; 29 September 1945 (age 80); Chelmsford, Essex, England
- Occupations: Historian, archivist
- Known for: Historian, Keeper of Public Records
- Title: Keeper of Public Records
- Term: 1991–2005
- Spouse: Nicholas Tyacke

Sarah Jacqueline Tyacke, CB, FSA, FRHistS, FRGS (née Jeacock; born 29 September 1945) is an English historian of cartography and travel and a former librarian and archivist. From 1991 to 2005 she served as Keeper of Public Records and chief executive of the UK Public Record Office, overseeing its transition to be the new National Archives in 2003.

== Early life and education ==
Tyacke was born Sarah Jeacock in Chelmsford, Essex, on 29 September 1945: her father, grandfather and great-grandfather had all been school headmasters. She was educated at Chelmsford County High School for Girls, before studying history at Bedford College, University of London, and graduating in 1968. During vacations from 1962 to 1968, she worked as a volunteer at Essex Record Office.

== Career ==
In 1968, Tyacke became an assistant keeper in the Map Room of the British Museum. From 1973 to 1985 she was Deputy Map Librarian in what had now become the British Library; and from 1986 to 1991 she was its director of special collections.

At the end of 1991 she was appointed Keeper of Public Records, the first woman to hold the post. Her tenure at the Public Record Office included the building of a much expanded repository on the office's site at Kew in 1995, and subsequent removal of services from the old Public Record Office building in Chancery Lane; the opening of a Family Records Centre for family historians in 1997; and merger of the office with the Royal Commission on Historical Manuscripts in 2003 to form the National Archives. At the merger, Tyacke was appointed its chief executive and sole historical manuscripts commissioner. She also oversaw numerous technical initiatives, including the launch of the 1901 census website as a pay-per-view service in 2002 and development of strategies for preserving born-digital records. She retired in 2005.

== Scholarship ==
Tyacke's personal scholarly interests cover the history of cartography and travel. She has written or edited several books and articles on these, and others on broader archival matters and archive management.

== Activities and honours ==
Tyacke was elected a Fellow of the Royal Geographical Society in 1968; of the Society of Antiquaries of London in 1984; of the Royal Historical Society in 1992; and of the British Cartographic Society in 1994. She served as president of the Hakluyt Society from 1997 to 2002, and as a vice-president from 2002 to 2006. She was a vice-president of the Royal Historical Society from 2000 to 2003, and has been an honorary vice-president since 2004. She has also sat on the council of the Society for Nautical Research.

She was vice-president of the International Council on Archives from 1996 to 2000. She was a trustee of the International Records Management Trust from 1995 to 2004, and has been its chair since 2004.

In 1999, she became an honorary fellow and visiting professor of Royal Holloway, University of London. She received honorary doctorates from London Guildhall and Essex Universities.

Tyacke was appointed a Companion of the Order of the Bath (CB) in 1998. On 25 November 2010, she was awarded the President's Medal by the British Academy "for her service to historical records, in particular through her work as head of the National Archives".

In 2006–2007, she held the Sandars Readership in Bibliography at Cambridge University.

== Other activities ==
From 2009 to 2011, Tyacke chaired the Mount Everest Foundation, a non-profit-making humanitarian and development body active in Nepal.

From 2009 to 2012, she sat on the Hillsborough Independent Panel investigating the Hillsborough disaster of 1989.

== Personal life ==
Tyacke is married to the early modern historian Nicholas Tyacke. She has one daughter.
