= Chris Kitching =

British archivist (born 1945)

Christopher John Kitching CBE (born 5 August 1945) is a British archivist who served as Secretary of the Royal Commission on Historical Manuscripts (now part of The National Archives) from 1992 to 2004.

== Career ==
Kitching completed a BA in Modern History at Durham University in 1967, followed by a PhD from the same institution in 1970. He was awarded the Alexander Prize from the Royal Historical Society in 1973. He began his career as an Assistant Keeper at the Public Record Office (PRO), where he worked until 1982, before joining the Royal Commission on Historical Manuscripts (HMC) as Assistant Secretary. He served in this role until 1992, when he became Secretary in succession to Brian Smith.

In April 2003, the HMC merged with the PRO to form The National Archives: Kitching moved to the new institution before retiring a year later.

== Publications ==
- (ed.) The Royal Visitation of 1559: act book for the northern province. Publications of the Surtees Society. Vol. 187. Durham: Surtees Society. 1975. ISBN 0854440062.
- The Central Records of the Church of England: a report and survey presented to the Pilgrim and Radcliffe Trustees. London: CIO Publishing. 1976. ISBN 071513678X.
- (ed.) London and Middlesex Chantry Certificate 1548. London Record Society. Vol. 16. London: London Record Society. 1980. ISBN 9780900952166.
- Archive Buildings in the United Kingdom 1977–1992. London: HMSO. 1993. ISBN 0-11-440244-2.
- Archives: the very essence of our heritage. Chichester: Phillimore. 1996. ISBN 1-86077-018-5.
- (ed.; with Michael Roper) Feet of Fines for the County of York: from 1314 to 1326. Yorkshire Archaeological Society Record Series. Vol. 158. Woodbridge: Yorkshire Archaeological Society. 2006. ISBN 1903564506.
- Archive Buildings in the United Kingdom 1993–2005. Chichester: Phillimore. 2007. ISBN 9781860774430.
- A Passion for Records: Walter Rye (1843–1929), topographer, sportsman and Norfolk's champion. Kibworth Beauchamp: Matador. 2017. ISBN 9781788039215.
