= Thirty-year rule =

British legal term

The thirty-year rule (an informal term) is a rule in the laws of the United Kingdom, Ireland, and the Commonwealth of Australia that provide that certain government documents will be considered for public release thirty years after they were created.

Some other countries' national archives also adhere to a thirty-year rule for the release of government documents.

== United Kingdom ==
In the United Kingdom, the Public Records Act 1958 stated that:

Public records [...] other than those to which members of the public have had access before their transfer [...] shall not be available for public inspection until they have been in existence for fifty years or such other period [...] as the Lord Chancellor may [...] for the time being prescribe as respects any particular class of public records.

The closure period was reduced from fifty to thirty years by an amending act of 1967, passed during Harold Wilson's government. Among those who had repeatedly urged the scrapping of the fifty-year rule was the historian A. J. P. Taylor.

There were two elements to the rule: the first required that records be transferred from government departments to the Public Record Office (now The National Archives) after thirty years unless specific exemptions were given (by the Lord Chancellor's Advisory Council on Public Records); the second that they would be opened to public access at the same time unless their release was deemed likely to cause "damage to the country's image, national security or foreign relations".

Significant changes were made to the rules as a consequence of the Freedom of Information Act 2000 (FOIA) (which came into full effect on 1 January 2005). FOIA essentially removed the second of the thirty-year rules (the access one), and replaced it with provisions allowing citizens to request a wide range of information before any time limit has expired; and also removed some of the exemptions which had previously applied at the thirty-year point. After thirty years, records are transferred to The National Archives, and are reviewed under FOIA to see if they should be opened. The only rationale for keeping them closed within The National Archives is if a FOIA exemption applies.

As a result of that change, releases now occur monthly, rather than annually, and include more recent events, rather than only those over thirty years old.

An independent inquiry chaired by Paul Dacre, editor of the Daily Mail, recommended in January 2009 that the last restrictions on the release of information, such as Cabinet minutes, should be reduced to a fifteen-year embargo and phased in over a fifteen-year period.

=== Change to a twenty-year rule ===
Under the Constitutional Reform and Governance Act 2010, the UK government started moving towards a twenty-year rule.

Files from 1983 were released in August 2013 rather than January 2014, as would previously have been the case, and files from 1984 were released in January 2014.

There were two releases per year until 2022, when the National Archives received the files from 2001 and 2002, having caught up with the transition.

== Australia ==
In Australia, the thirty-year rule applied to Commonwealth (federal) government records, except for Cabinet handbooks (closed for fifty years) and raw census records (closed for 99 years). Those periods were laid down in the Archives Act 1983.

In 2009, the Archives Act was amended to reduce the closed period from thirty to twenty years, with Cabinet notebooks reduced from fifty to thirty years. Census records remain closed for 99 years to protect the privacy of individuals.

Cabinet papers for a full year are released on 1 January each year. To reduce the withholding period from 30 to 20 years, two years of cabinet papers, and three years of cabinet notebooks, have been released simultaneously from 2011 until 2020, when the new 20-year period will be reached.

== Ireland ==
The Government of Ireland declassifies files in a similar fashion according to the thirty-year rule. In recent years, files relating to the state’s role in the conflict in Northern Ireland known as The Troubles are declassified in late December of each year.

== Canada ==
The Supreme Court of Canada has previously argued in favour of Cabinet confidentiality. In the decision Babcock v AG Canada the court explained the reason as:

The process of democratic governance works best when Cabinet members charged with government policy and decision-making are free to express themselves around the Cabinet table unreservedly.

To preserve this rule of confidentiality, subsection 70(1) of the Privacy Act provides that the Act does not apply to confidences of the Queen's Privy Council for Canada. Other notable cases that expand upon the doctrine of cabinet confidentiality include Canada (Minister of Environment) v. Canada (Information Commissioner), 2003 FCA 68 and Quinn v. Canada (Prime Minister), 2011 FC 379. As of 2013, after a time lag of 20 years Canadians can submit access-to-information requests for cabinet records through the Privy Council Office, but this comes at a cost of $5 per request and can take months to process. In May 2018, it was disclosed that the Supreme Court of Canada under Chief Justice Beverley McLachlin had placed a "50-year from the time they rule on a case" embargo on public access to files related to the deliberations of the judges.

According to Archivist Michael Dufresne, it was not until 1940 and the advent of the Second World War that Cabinet kept an agenda and minutes of its deliberations. From 1867 to 1940, a succession of six men served as Clerk of the Privy Council, and their duties included serving as the only institutional memory bank of the Government of Canada. The appointment in 1940 of Arnold Danforth Patrick Heeney as Clerk and as first Secretary to the Cabinet changed the format of memory bank from biological to scriptural. Heeney was surprised upon arrival by the informal ways in which important business was conducted:

I found it shattering to discover that the highest committee in the land conducted its business in such a disorderly fashion that it employed no agenda and no minutes were taken. The more I learned about Cabinet practices, the more difficult it was for me to understand how such a regime could function at all.

Order-in-Council PC 1940-1121 of March 25, 1940 ushered in a significant change in the documentation of government. The Order-in-Council read, in part:

The great increase in the work of the Cabinet... has rendered it necessary to make provision for the performance of additional duties of a secretarial nature relating principally to the collecting and putting into shape of agenda of Cabinet meetings, providing of information and material necessary for the deliberations of the Cabinet and the drawing up of records of the results, for communication to the departments concerned...

Heeney established procedures and for the first time recorded the minutes and conclusions of a cabinet body – the Cabinet War Committee. In 1942, the Statutory Orders and Regulations Division was set up under PC 7992, 4 September 1942. Also under PC 7992, a registry for maintaining orders and minutes of council, Treasury Board Minutes and other government orders was established. It was not until 1944 that the formal collection of "Cabinet Conclusions" was created.

In the early 1980s, the PCO began a voluntary transfer of cabinet records, which had been declassified after a 30-year holding period, to the National Archives (which became Library and Archives Canada in 2004) where they became publicly available, under the label "Cabinet Conclusions". After an initial document dump that included records dated from 1937 to 1952, the PCO released the records on an annual basis.

In 2008, two years after Prime Minister Stephen Harper was elected, the tradition of annual voluntary releases of Cabinet Conclusions stopped.

In September 2013 while the Harper government was in power, PCO spokesman Raymond Rivet told a news organisation that the office was "committed" to making government documents and information accessible but that "Processing these records requires a significant investment of resources. We will continue to process and release records as resources permit."

In May 2017, it came to light that the Government of Canada was under no obligation to release documentary records after a number of years. NDP Member of Parliament (MP) Murray Rankin, a legal scholar, said at the time:

It's a question of political will. Some countries do this a lot better than Canada. The Americans do. The Swedes do. The British do. We have to catch up.

In June 2017, an agreement between the Supreme Court of Canada and Library and Archives Canada arranged for the transfer of case-files under a 50-year rule.

== Israel ==
Israel adopted the British model of a thirty-year rule as the basis for reviewing and declassifying its foreign policy documents. Israeli declassification policy is based on the Archives law of 1955. The principle of the law is that all material is to be released after thirty years, subject to limitations based on damage to state security, foreign policy or personal privacy. In practice this means that declassification of documents are fixed at different periods based on type of material and date of production.

The original law has been modified and updated a number of times. Following a 2010 update of the legislation, the office of the Prime Minister released as statement explaining that "the new regulations shorten the period after which non-security-related material may be viewed, from 30 to 15 years, while lengthening the confidentiality period of certain defense-related documents to 70 years in cases in which Israel's security conditions require it".

== Germany ==
The German Federal Archives generally makes its holdings available after 30 years. Exceptions are for personnel files, which are opened only 10 years after the death of the individual or 100 years after the person's birth if the date of death is unknown, and records dealing with taxation, credit, and banking, which are sealed for 60 years.

Additionally, Federal Archives holdings originating with the Communist Party and communist organizations of the former German Democratic Republic (East Germany) have been available for decades with almost no limitations. The Federal Archives has also worked to make East German government records available with a minimum of time limitation. In any event, since October 2020, 30 years have passed from the dissolution of the GDR.

== See also ==
- Classified information in the United Kingdom
- Freedom of Information Act 2000
- Freedom of information in the United Kingdom
- Freedom of information legislation
- Sanitization (classified information)
- The National Archives
