= Maughan Library =

Main academic and research library of King's College London

Maughan Library, King's College London

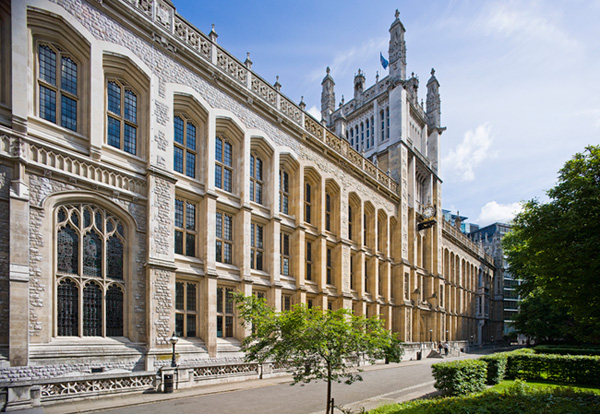
- The Maughan Library with the Clock Tower
- 51.5153°N 0.1106°W
- Location: Chancery Lane; London, WC2, United Kingdom
- Type: Academic library
- Established: 1232 Domus Conversorum; 1377 Chapel/House of Master of the Rolls; 1851 Public Record Office; 2001 Maughan Library
- Branch of: King's College London Library Services
- Branches: 8

Collection
- Items collected: Books, journals, newspapers, magazines, sound and music recordings, maps, prints, drawings and manuscripts
- Size: 750k items (approx.)

Access and use
- Access requirements: Students and staff of King's College London and other University of London colleges, some SCONUL Access Card holders and members of the public with legitimate research needs

Other information
- Budget: £5,087,981 (Expenditure on print and electronic resources across all branches 2011–12)
- Director: Lis Hannon
- Website: kcl.ac.uk/library

The Maughan Library (/mɔːn/) is the main university research library of King's College London, forming part of the Strand Campus. A 19th-century neo-Gothic building located on Chancery Lane in the City of London, it was formerly the home to the headquarters of the Public Record Office, known as the "strong-box of the Empire", and was acquired by the university in 2001. Following a £35M renovation designed by Gaunt Francis Architects, the Maughan is the largest new university library in the United Kingdom since World War II.

== History ==
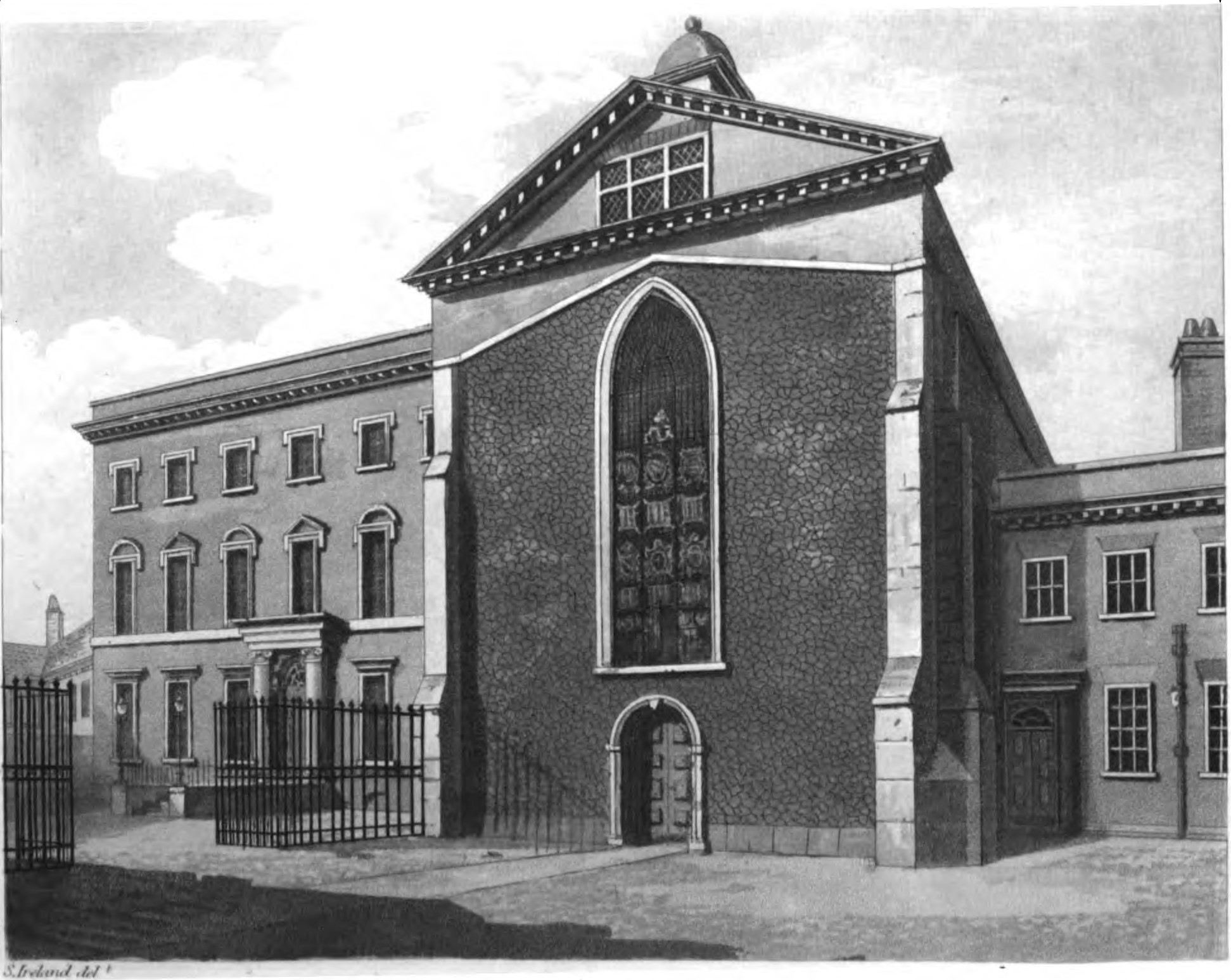
Rolls Chapel and Rolls House in 1800. The chapel was rebuilt in 1617 by Inigo Jones, the remains of which form part of the now Weston Room, the oldest section of the Maughan Library

=== Early history ===
The library building seen today was built in 1851, however, its roots date back to the 13th century.

==== Rolls Chapel ====
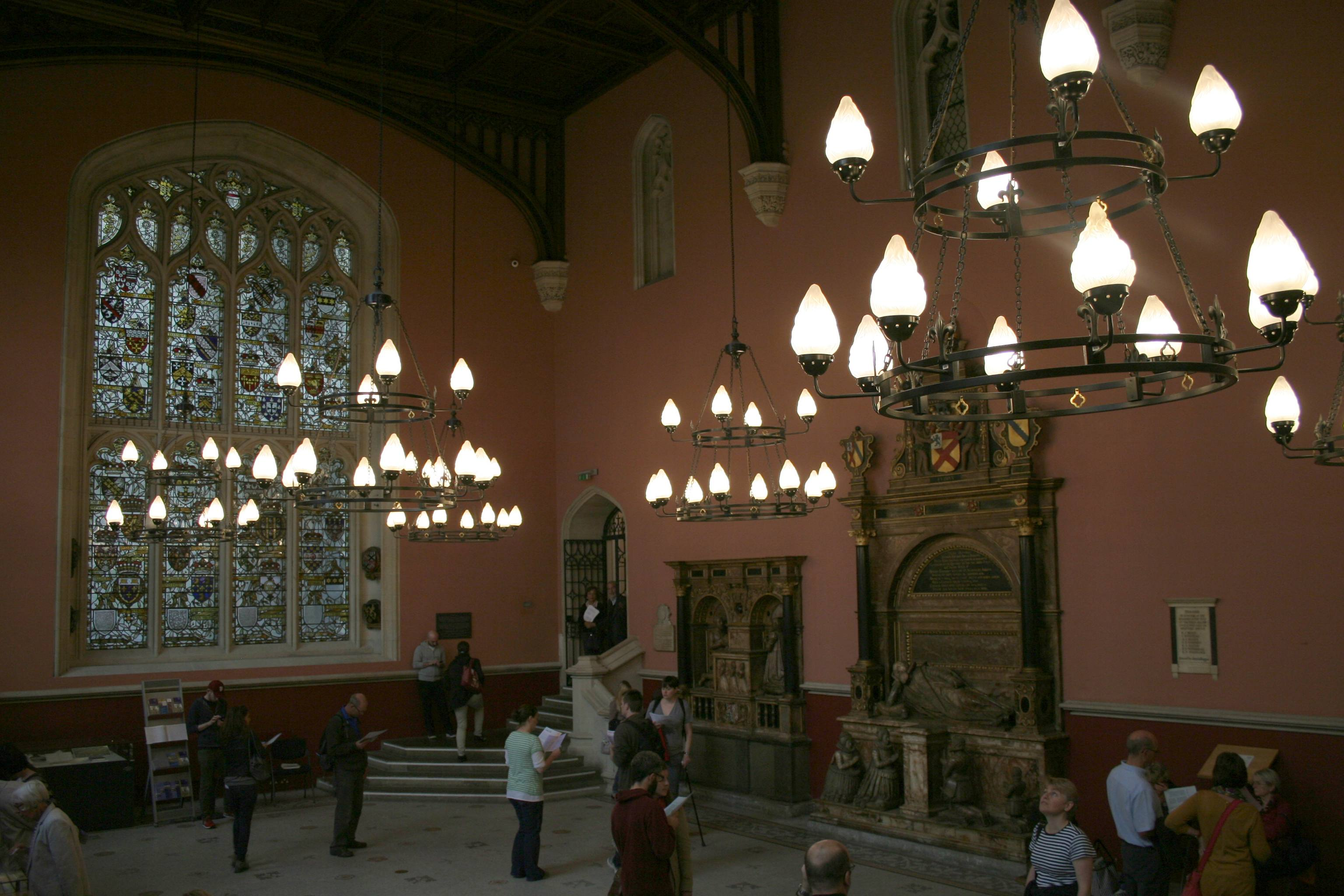
The Weston Room in 2013, which forms part of the Rolls Chapel (roots dating back c1232)

The Maughan occupies the site of the Domus Conversorum (House of the Converts or Le Converse Inn in Norman French), later known as the Chapel of the Master of the Rolls because the Master of the Rolls was warden of the Domus Conversorum. The House of the Converts was established by Henry III in 1232 to provide a residence and chapel for Jews who had converted to Christianity, and the chapel attached to it began the following year.

In 1278, in a letter given to the king by John the Convert, the Converts referred to themselves as Pauperes Cœlicolæ Christi. During the reign of Richard II, certain Converts received, for life, a two-pence wage; and in the reign of Henry IV, by special patent, a rabbi's daughter was given a penny for life by the keepers of the House.

Following the expulsion of Jews from England by Edward I through the Edict of Expulsion in 1290, the Master of the Rolls became warden and the chapel became known as the Chapel of the Master of the Rolls, or Rolls Chapel. In 1377, Edward III broke up the Jewish almshouse, consequently annexing the House as well as the chapel to the newly instituted office of Custos Rotulorum, or Keeper of the Rolls. The office is used to store the rolls and records of the Court of Chancery.

The chapel was rebuilt in 1617 by Inigo Jones at a cost of £2,000, and the poet and priest John Donne preached during the consecration. It was rebuilt again in 1734, and altered in 1784. The records were moved in 1856 and the chapel was demolished in 1895. The only remains are an arch mounted on the garden elevation of the Chancery lane wing, some tomb monuments, stained glass panels and a mosaic floor.

There are three principal tomb monuments. The first commemorates John Yonge (d.1516), Master of the Rolls in the early part of the reign of Henry VIII. The work of Pietro Torrigiano (who also made the tomb of Henry VII in Westminster Abbey), it features a recumbent effigy with hands crossed, wearing a red gown and square cap. The second, attributed to the Cure workshop, commemorates Richard Allington (d.1561) and his wife: it includes kneeling figures of the couple facing one another across a prayer-desk, on the front of which are depicted in relief their three daughters, also kneeling. The third monument, attributed to Maximilian Colt, is that of Edward Bruce, 1st Lord Kinloss (d.1611), whose semi-recumbent effigy wears a long-furred robe: below him are four kneeling figures, including a man in armour, perhaps his son, Edward.

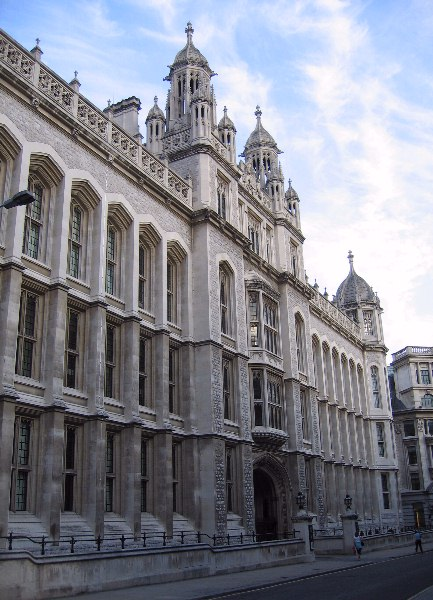
The current Maughan Library building, designed by Sir James Pennethorne, was rebuilt from 1851 to 1890s

==== Rolls House ====
Rolls House was the official residence of the Master of the Rolls and remained in the possession of the office until 1837, when it was surrendered to the Crown.

=== Public Record Office ===
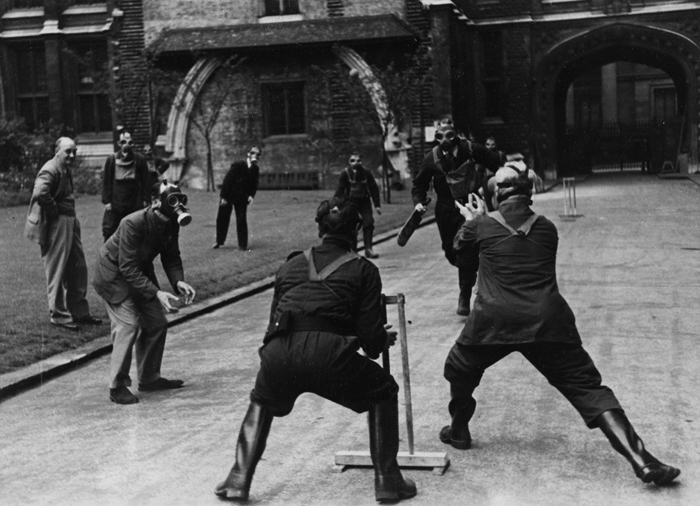
Public Record Office staff play cricket outside Chancery Lane offices during The Blitz

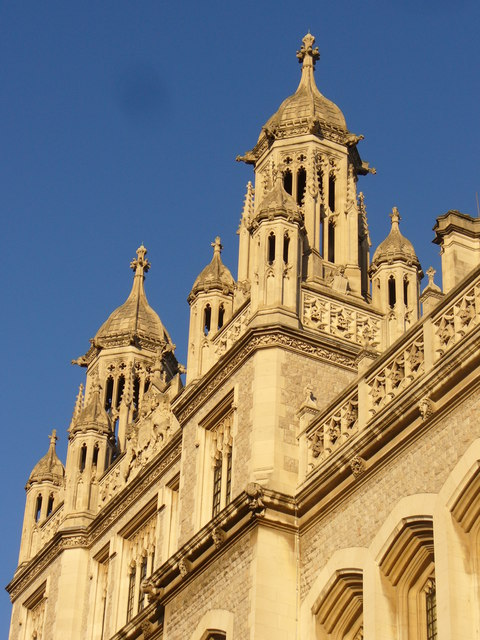
Ivory-looking towers surrounding the library building, here viewed from Chancery Lane, radiant during summer sunset

In 1838 the Public Record Office Act was passed to "keep safely the public records". Construction of the earliest part of the building seen today, the central wing, began in 1851. As a repository, it is claimed to be the first purpose-built fireproof building in England. To minimise the risk of fire the storerooms were designed as compartmentalised closed cells and the building had no heating. One of the cells which stored documents remains in its original condition, including its bookcases and fire proof slate shelves. Two search rooms were added in 1863 and a clock tower was built in 1865. In 1869–71 the building was extended along Fetter Lane, and in the 1890s two more wings designed by Sir John Taylor were added. At this time the medieval walls of the chapel were found to be unsound and had to be rebuilt. In 1902 the chapel became a museum of the Public Record Office. By 1997 all records were transferred to a new site in Kew or the Family Records Centre in Islington.

=== University library ===
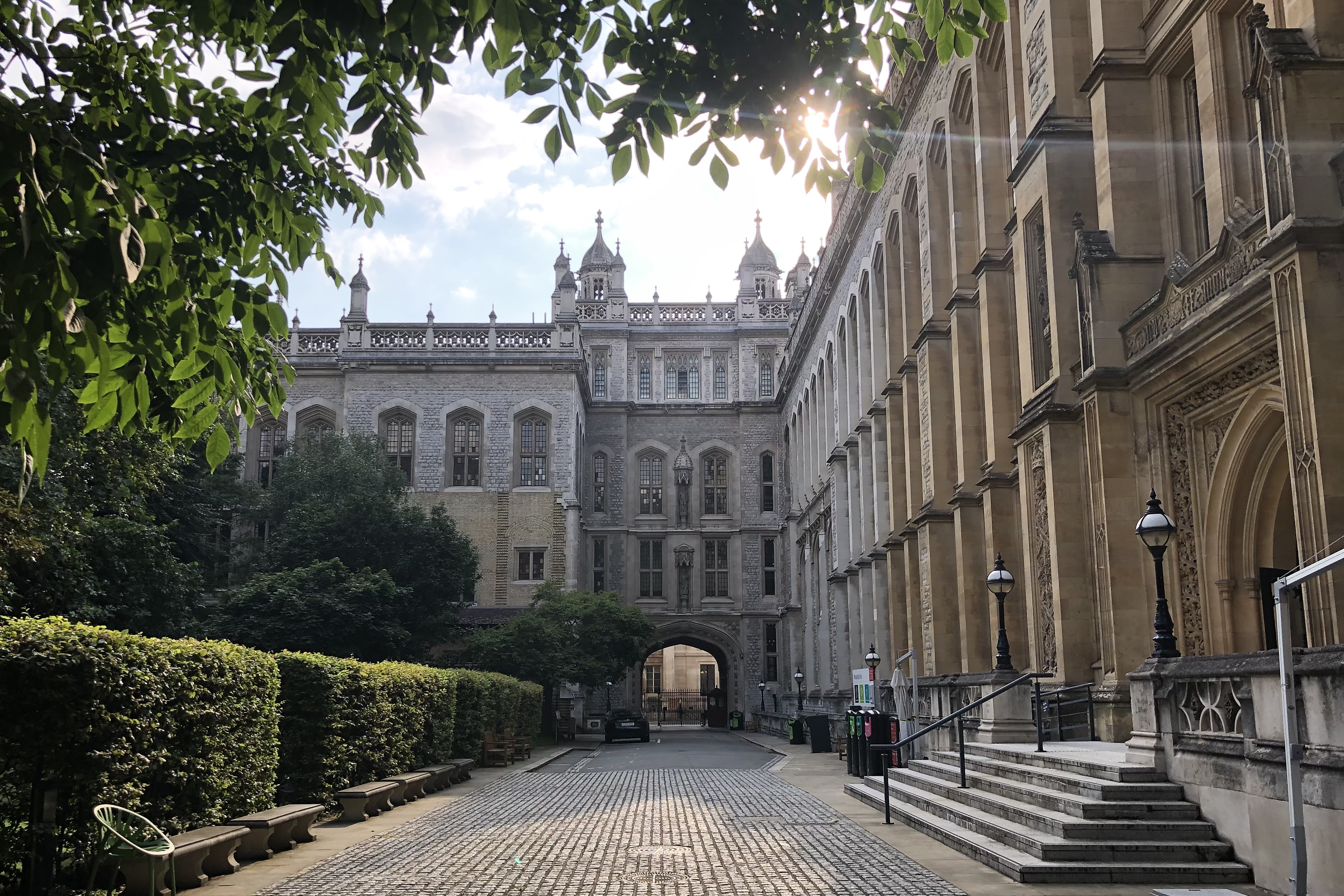
The courtyard of the Maughan Library facing west

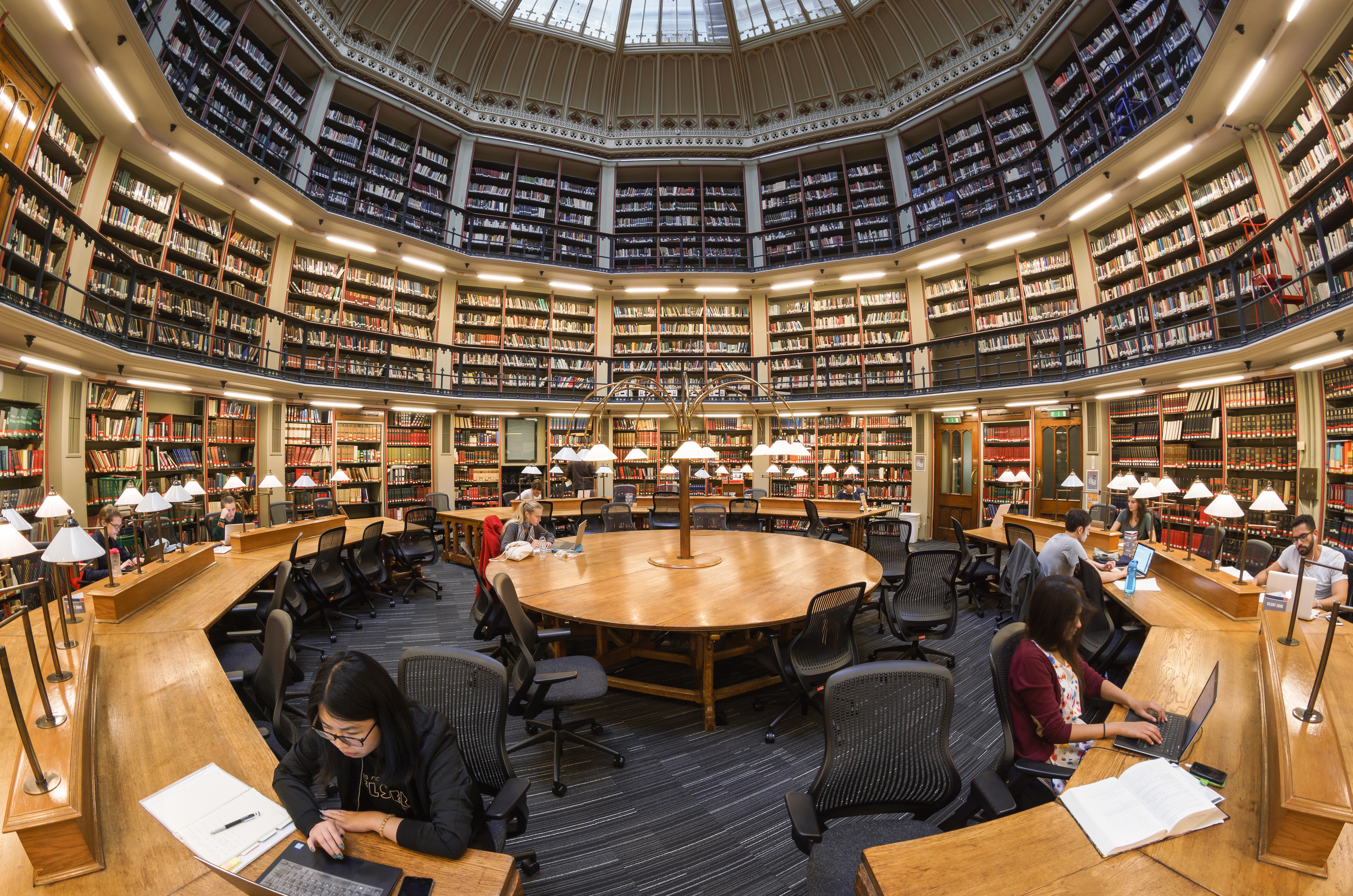
The domed Round Reading Room

In 2001 King's College London acquired the building from the Crown Estate and appointed a design team led by Gaunt Francis Architects to oversee the renovation. The renovation took two-years, at a cost of £35m. During the works, two rare painted zinc ceilings from the 1860s (one forms part of the ceiling of the round reading room and another is located above the lobby entrance) and a fine 1901 tessellated floor were discovered. Former president of RIBA, Maxwell Hutchinson commented on the project, "I have to say that this is one of the best marriages between an important redundant building and a new use I've come across in a very long time." The library was opened by Queen Elizabeth II in November 2002, and the project received the 2003 City Heritage Award. The library was named after Sir Deryck Maughan, an alumnus of King's, who together with Lady Maughan made a £4m donation towards the new university library. It is the largest new university library in Britain since World War II.

The surviving part of the chapel is called the Weston Room, following a donation from the Garfield Weston Foundation, and is used to as an exhibition space for the Foyle Special Collections Library. The Weston Room incorporates many features from the former Rolls Chapel, including stained glass windows, a mosaic floor, and three 16th and 17th century funerary monuments. One is a Renaissance terracotta figure by Pietro Torrigiano of John Yonge (d. 1516), Master of the Rolls and Dean of York, described as the "earliest Renaissance monument in England". The Tudor roses and a lunette of angels found on the back of the sarcophagus resemble those on Henry VII's monument, also by Torrigiano, located in Westminster Abbey. Another is of Richard Allington (d. 1561), and is probably the work of one of the Curl family, Flemish master masons to the Crown. A third is of Lord Bruce of Kinloss (d. 1616), Master of the Rolls. It depicts him with his daughter, who was married in the Rolls Chapel to the future Earl of Devonshire and his son, who would be created Earl of Elgin. The stained glass windows display the arms of former Master of the Rolls, including those of Henry Prince of Wales, Sir Thomas Egerton, Sir Robert Cecil and Sir Edward Phelips, and date from 1611. Stained glass panels of the coat of arms of George IV dated 1823 were originally placed in the east window of the chapel and were rediscovered during the restoration works in 2002. Their restoration was funded by The Crown Estate to mark the opening of the library.

The building has 1,250 networked reader places in a variety of environments including individual study carrels and group study rooms.

== Holdings ==
The Maughan holds more than 750,000 items including books, journals, CDs, records, DVDs, theses and exam papers. These items cover four of the college's academic schools of study: Arts and Humanities, Law, Natural & Mathematical Sciences and Social Science & Public Policy. This includes the pre-2020 Chartered Institute of Taxation's Tony Arnold Library and the post-1850 collection of Sion College. The library also holds more than 150,000 78rpm records donated by the BBC in 2001 which span a wide range of genres. In addition to the main catalogue the library holds special collections, and archives which contain around 5 million documents in total.

=== Foyle Special Collections Library ===
The library is also home to the Foyle Special Collections Library, named in recognition of a grant from the Foyle Foundation, which houses approximately 170,000 printed works, as well as maps, slides, sound recordings and manuscript material. Included among the manuscript material is the Carnegie Collection of British Music, a collection of original signed manuscripts, many of them by notable composers, whose publication was funded by the philanthropist Andrew Carnegie via the Carnegie UK Trust. The collection also contains several volumes of incunabula (works printed before 1501). The collections range in date from the fifteenth century to the present day. In 2007 the library acquired the historical collections of the British Foreign and Commonwealth Office, which includes Britain's 1812 declaration of war on the US, and contains over 60,000 items. The collections include:

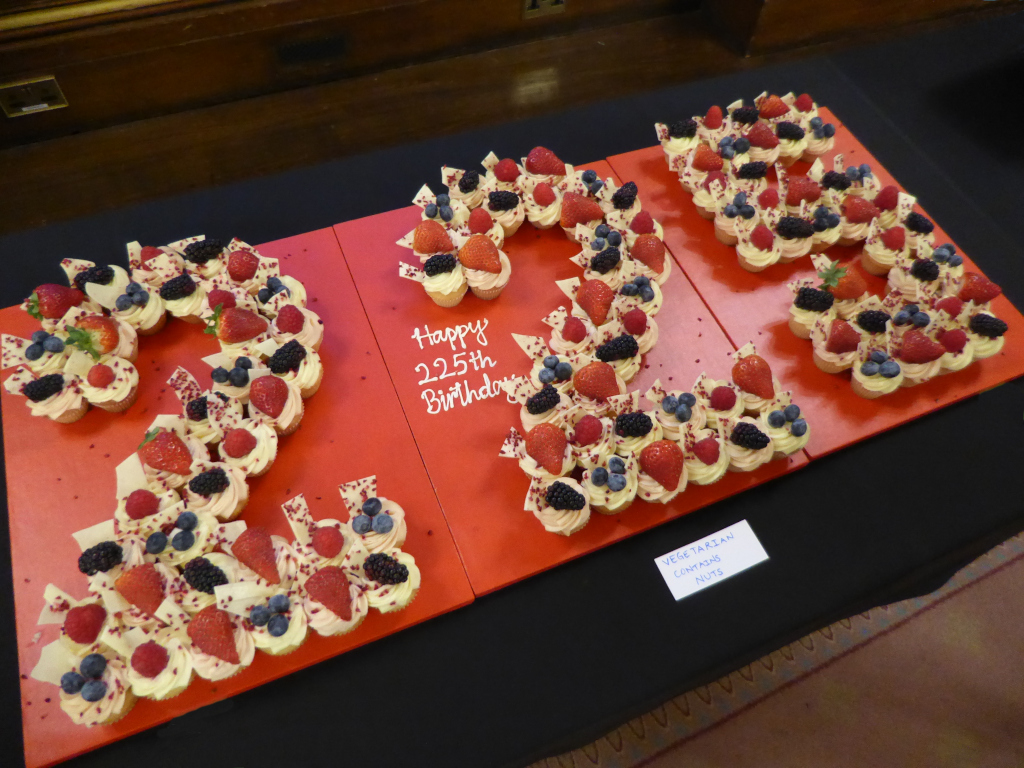
In 2026 The Foreign and Commonwealth Office library celebrated its 225th birthday

- HG Adler Collection
- Jeremy Adler Collection
- Box Collection
- The Carnegie Collection of British Music
- Cohn Collection
- College Collection
- De Beer Collection
- Early Science Collection
- The Foreign and Commonwealth Office Historical Collection
- Guy's Hospital Physical Society Collection
- Institute for the Study and Treatment of Delinquency Collection
- King's College School of Medicine and Dentistry Historical Collection
- Miscellaneous Collection
- Rainbow Collection
- Reginald Ruggles Gates Collection
- The Stebbing Collection
- St Thomas' Hospital Historical Collection
- Wheatstone Collection

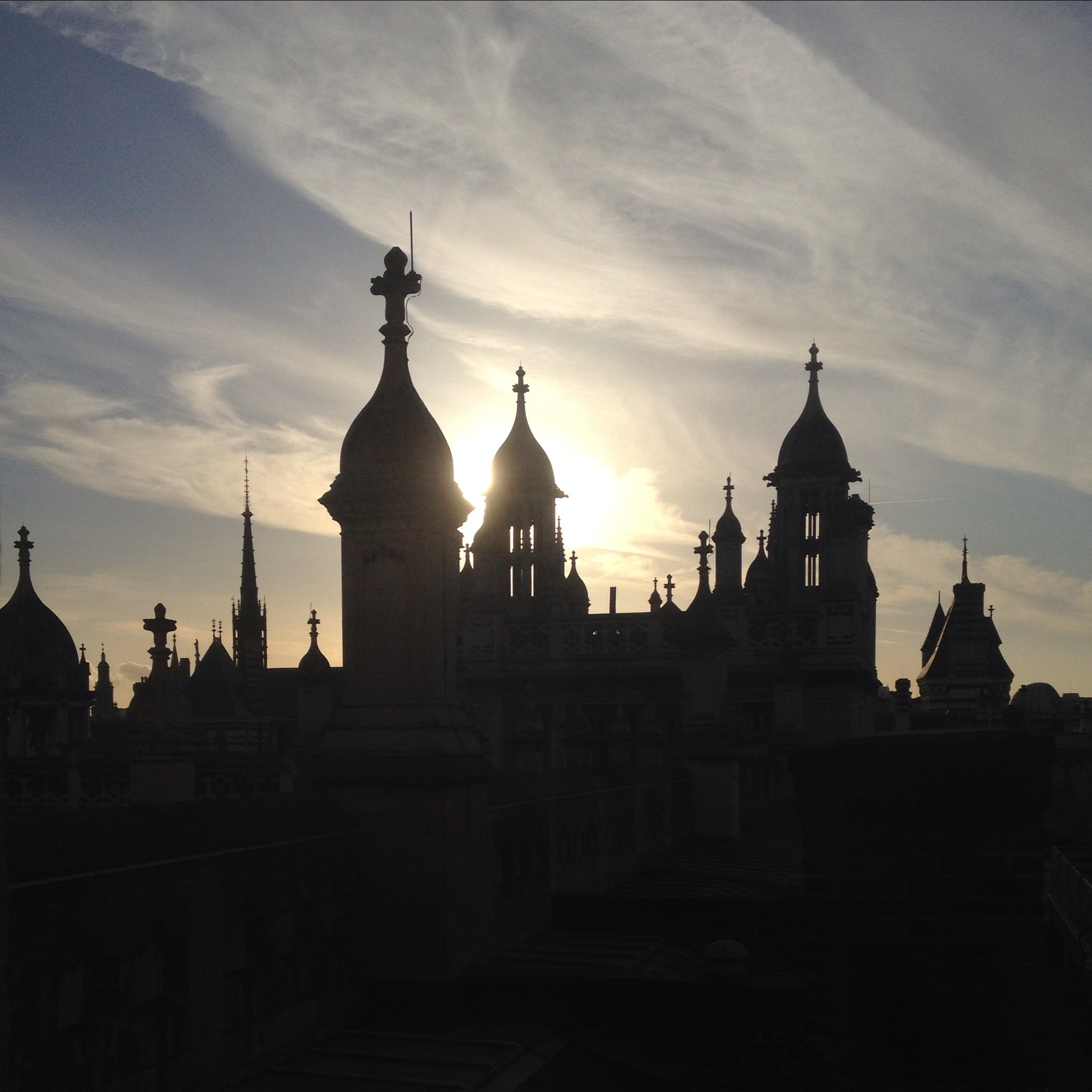
A view from one of the postgraduate study carrels at the Clock Tower at dusk

=== Liddell Hart Centre for Military Archives ===
Established in 1964, the Liddell Hart Centre for Military Archives (LHCMA) is a leading repository for research into modern defence policy in the United Kingdom. The collections are of national and international importance and were awarded Designated Status by the Museums, Libraries and Archives Council in 2005. The core of the collection comprises the private papers of over 700 senior British military personnel who held office since 1900. Other highlights include the former private library of Captain Sir Basil Liddell Hart, after whom the centre is named.

== Garden ==
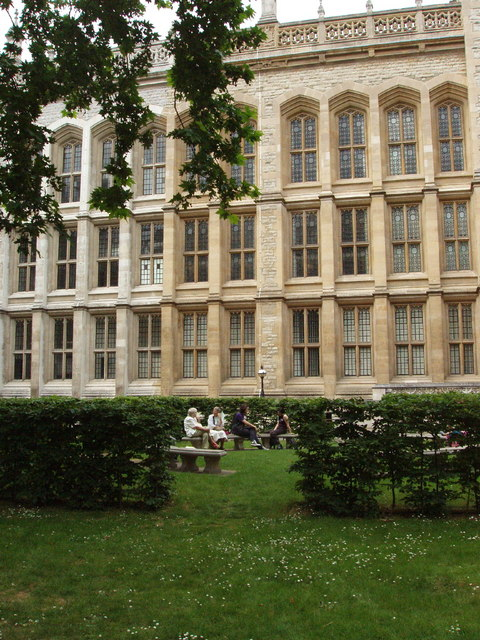
One of the 'green rooms' of the library garden

The garden opposite the library was originally owned by Clifford's Inn, and part of the garden was acquired by the Public Record Office in 1912. Following the acquisition of the site by King's a new garden was commissioned. The garden was designed by George Carter and won the Metropolitan Public Gardens Association's London Spade Award in 2003. The design is based on three 'green rooms' designed to complement the original storeroom cells of the building. There is an emphasis on shades of green rather than colour planting, with the use of hornbeam, lime and yew. The garden has two sculptures and a small water feature. One of the sculptures is by Dorothy Brook, and a bronze statue of Confucius, located in the centre 'room', was donated by The Confucian Academy in 2010 to mark the official launch of the Lau China Institute. A series of relief plaques of the continents by Walter Crane are installed on a small brick building now used for storing bicycles. These were formerly on St Dunstan's House situated on Fetter Lane, which was demolished in 1976, and the grounds where the house was situated paved the way for new luxury residential apartments to be built.

== In fiction ==
The dodecagonal reading room is one of the locations consulted by Robert Langdon and Sophie Neveu in chapters 92 and 95 of the Dan Brown novel, The Da Vinci Code. The library was also used as a filming location for exterior shots of the Tower of London in the 2003 film, Johnny English. Part of the music video of the song Twilight's Chapter Seven from the album Still Fantasy by Taiwanese musician Jay Chou was filmed at the Maughan. The use of the round reading room as a filming location for Dumbledore's Office in the Harry Potter films has been the source of considerable talk and rumour, however, a feature in an edition of the King's Library Newsletter confirms that this is in fact a myth, though the library receives several requests to film each month. The exterior of the building appears in the 2020 film Enola Holmes.

== Vice-chancellor's residence ==
The top floor of the Chancery Lane wing of the library building contains a 170-square-metre (1,800 sq ft) flat used as the residence of the vice-chancellor of King's College London during their term of office.

== Bibliography ==
- Adler, Michael. History of the "Domus Conversorum" from 1290 to 1891. London: Ballantyne, Hanson & Co.
- Bradley, Simon; Pevsner, Nikolaus (1997). London 1: The City of London. The Buildings of England (4th ed.). London: Penguin Books. pp. 326–28. ISBN 0-14-071092-2.
- Darby, Trudi & Bell, Anne (2002). "Ancient and modern: the Maughan Library", Report (Issue No. 10). London: King's College London. pp. 56–63.
- Dewe, Michael (2009). Renewing Our Libraries: Case Studies in Re-Planning and Refurbishment. Ashgate Publishing Limited. ISBN 978-0-7546-7339-2.
- C. Hibbert; B. Weinreb; J. Keay; J. Keay (2008). The London Encyclopedia (3rd ed.). Pan Macmillan. p. 958. ISBN 9780230738782.
- Maxwell Lyte, H. C. (1907). Catalogue of Manuscripts and Other Objects in the Museum of the Public Record Office, with brief descriptive and historical notes (4th ed.). London: HMSO.
- O'Leary, John (2010). The Times Good University Guide 2011. London. ISBN 9780007356140.
- Sibbald, J. (1800). Edinburgh Magazine: Or Literary Miscellany. Vol. 15. Murray and Highley, Fleet Street. p. 356.
- Stow, William (1722). Remarks on London: being an exact survey of the cities of London and Westminster, Borough of Southwark. London: Printed for T. Norris and H. Tracy. p. 121.
- "£4m Gift for King's", Comment (Issue No. 140) (PDF). London: King's College London. March 2002. pp. 1–2.
- Strand Campus Tour (PDF), London: King's College London
- King's College London Library Services (2011), Library Services Annual Report 2011-12 (PDF), King's College London, archived from the original (PDF) on 19 June 2013
