= Jeremy Langford (sculptor) =

British Israeli glass sculptor

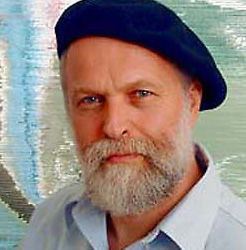

Jeremy Langford (born London, England, 1956) is a British/Israeli glass sculptor and designer. His artistic specialties are monumental stacked glass sculpture, architectural glass, and stained glass. He has been commissioned worldwide to create glass art for governments, private houses, corporations, hotels, and religious organisations. Major works include monumental glass installations at the Western Wall in Jerusalem, the ancient tomb of the Matriarch Rachel in Bethlehem, three massive sculptures for the Trump Towers at Sunny Isles Beach, Florida, and the new Waldorf Astoria hotel in Jerusalem. His studio is in Israel.

== Biography ==
Jeremy Langford was born in London, England in 1956, moving later to Melbourne, Australia at the age of 13. His first experiences in experimenting with glasswork followed two years later, melting bottles in an old ceramic kiln, using the raw material to make his first stained glass works. He moved back to the U.K. at 18. He became a glass artist apprentice acquiring the glassmaking techniques and skill sets he would use as a foundation in his later artistic works.

Langford's original surname was Lelyveld, his family being natives of the Netherlands. Langford's father, Barry Langford (b. London, England, 1926) was the BBC producer and director who created the first pop-music shows for the BBC network and directed many, including the Tom Jones Show.

Jeremy married Yael Langford (née Itach), an Israeli scientist who specialized in quantum chemistry and the relationship between brainwaves and consciousness. They had five children together. The couple was involved together in a beta project involving the connection between art, brainwaves, and consciousness. Yael Langford died on 15 September 2009.

Langford has studied Ashlagian Kabbalah and Jewish spiritual teachings since 1977. He became a full-time student of Rabbi Baruch Ashlag in 1984 until his teacher's death on 13 September 1991. He founded and heads the Ashlag Heritage Foundation in Israel and is working on a website of Rabbi Yehuda Ashlag's teachings that features a full search engine of Ashlagian Kabbalisitc teachings. In 1995 he founded Galim: The Human Potential Institute with his wife.

== Art career ==
Establishing himself with a studio in London in the mid-1970s, his time was divided between the U.K. and Israel while he further developed his glass art skills. During this time he began experimenting with stacked sculptural glass.

Langford's projects include three monumental sculptures in the Trump International Towers at Sunny Isles Beach, Florida and a sculpture in the Miami Four Seasons Hotel. His glasswork can also be seen at a number of public buildings in New York, California.. Other artistic works have been installed in several important synagogues.

Holocaust Memorial Glass Sculpture At The Western Wall in Jerusalem

Among the best-known of Jeremy Langford's projects is the Chain of Generations Center, a heritage center at Jerusalem's Western Wall created in 2006. Extending down into the catacombs at the edge of the Western Wall, the site has a large collection of glass sculptures that document the history of the Jewish people from biblical times to the present day. The project was partly funded by Mortimer Zuckerman, US media magnate. The sculptural glass artwork has carved and etched layers of plate glass, which required nearly 150 tons of glass to create. The project received the Thea Award from the Themed Entertainment Association (The Disney Corporation) as the “Outstanding Heritage Center worldwide 2008”.

Recently, Langford has focused on making studio glass, creating sculptures for private collectors and art museums. He also creates glass art and stained glass for synagogues and private homes.

== Selected works ==
• The Supreme Court Building, Jerusalem

• The City of David, Jerusalem

• Residence of the President of Israel, Jerusalem

• The Western Wall Tunnels, Old City, Jerusalem

• The Waldorf Astoria Hotel, Jerusalem

• The Tomb of the biblical Matriarch Rachel, Bethlehem

• The Tomb of King David, Jerusalem

• The Tomb of the prophet Samuel, Jerusalem

• Bar Ilan University, Ramat Gan, Israel

• Ben Gurion Airport, Tel Aviv

• British Museum, London

• Hilton Hotel, Mayfair, London

• Trump International Towers, Sunny Isles Beach, Florida

• Four Seasons Hotel, Miami

== Publications ==
- Jeremy Langford, “Chambers of History,” Faith & Form, the Interfaith Journal on Religion, Art and Architecture, vol. 39, no., 2006. | ISSN 0014-7001
