= RCHM =

RCHM may refer to

- Royal Commission on the Historical Monuments of England
- Royal Commission on Historical Manuscripts (though this is more usually abbreviated as HMC)
