= David Evans (archivist) =

Welsh archivist (1893–1987)

Sir David Evans OBE, FRHistS
- Born: David Lewis Evans; 14 August 1893
- Died: 23 April 1987 (aged 93)
- Education: Bachelor of Arts (BA); Bachelor of Letters (BLitt)
- Military career
- Allegiance: United Kingdom
- Branch: British Army
- Unit: Duke of Wellington's Regiment
- Conflicts: First World War

Sir David Lewis Evans, OBE, FRHistS (14 August 1893 – 23 April 1987) was a Welsh archivist who served as executive head of the Public Record Office from 1954 to 1960 (under the successive titles of Deputy Keeper of Public Records, 1954–58; and Keeper of Public Records, 1958–60).

== Early life ==
Born on 14 August 1893, Evans was the son of the Rev. David Evans and his wife Margaret, née Lewis. He attended Bridgend County School, the University College of Wales and then Jesus College, Oxford, earning Bachelor of Arts (BA) and Bachelor of Letters (BLitt) degrees. In 1915, he was commissioned into the Duke of Wellington's Regiment and served out the First World War in France and Belgium.

== Career ==
In 1921, Evans joined the Public Record Office. In the lead-up to the Second World War, he travelled across London to find suitable locations to which the Office's documents could be evacuated. Some were placed in hospital wards, but many, including Domesday Book, were held in Shepton Mallet prison. He was then responsible for arranging their return after the war, and collected Domesday Book himself in an unmarked van. With that done, he could focus on reorganising the Public Record Office Museum. In 1947, he became Principal Assistant Keeper and simultaneously took up a lectureship at the School of Librarianship and Archives, University College London, where he taught administrative history and archive studies. He served in both posts until 1954, when he was appointed Deputy Keeper – the professional head of the Public Record Office. Until 1959, the Master of the Rolls was nominal Keeper, but at the start of that year, the position was transferred to Evans who became the first civil servant to be Keeper of Public Records.

He retired the following year, but continued to serve as a member of the Advisory Council on Public Records until 1965 and as a Commissioner of the Royal Commission on Historical Manuscripts until 1980. He was a Governor of the British Film Institute, the National Library of Wales and the National Museum of Wales. In the words of The Times, "he was a records man of the old school who saw it as his job to make documents readily available to scholars, at whose disposal he also placed his own expertise". He was interested in mediaeval Welsh history and published Flintshire Ministers' Accounts, 1328–1352 in 1929. Evans was a Fellow and Vice-President (1956–60) of the Royal Historical Society, an Officer of the Order of the British Empire (1947) and a Knight Bachelor (1958). He was President of the Aberystwyth Old Students' Association in 1962–63.

== Personal life ==
Evans was married to Marie Christine Austin, daughter of Edwin Austin, a magistrate. The couple had two daughters. Marie died in 1966 and Evans died on 23 April 1987.

Other offices
Preceded by Sir Hilary Jenkinson	(Deputy) Keeper of the Public Records; 1954–1960	Succeeded by Stephen Wilson
Professional and academic associations
Preceded by Prof. T. Campbell James	President of the Aberystwyth Old Students' Association; 1962–63	Succeeded by Prof. David James Llewelfryn Davies
