= Australian Constitution (Public Record Copy) Act 1990 =

Act of the Parliament of the United Kingdom

Australian Constitution (Public Record Copy) Act 1990 (Note: Section 2.)
- Act of Parliament
- Parliament of the United Kingdom
- Long title: An Act to exclude one of the record copies of the Commonwealth of Australia Constitution Act 1900 from the public records to which the Public Records Act 1958 applies.
- Citation: 1990 c. 17
- Territorial extent: United Kingdom

Dates
- Royal assent: 29 June 1990
- Commencement: 29 June 1990 (Note: Section 4(b) of the Interpretation Act 1978.)
Other legislation
Relates to	Public Records Act 1958

Status: Current legislation

Text of statute as originally enacted

Revised text of statute as amended

Text of the Australian Constitution (Public Record Copy) Act 1990 as in force today (including any amendments) within the United Kingdom, from legislation.gov.uk.

The Australian Constitution (Public Record Copy) Act 1990 (c. 17) is an act of the Parliament of the United Kingdom, passed in 1990.

== Background ==
The public record copy of the Commonwealth of Australia Constitution Act 1900 (63 & 64 Vict. c. 12) was loaned to Australia in 1988 for the bicentenary of British settlement in Australia. The Australian government made a formal request to Queen Elizabeth II for the act to remain in Australia, as part of the nation's history after the original loan was over. However, under the UK's Public Records Act 1958 (6 & 7 Eliz. 2. c. 51), the original copy of every act of Parliament had to remain in the Public Record Office in London.

== Provisions ==
Section 1 of the act provides that the copy of the Commonwealth of Australia Constitution Act 1900 (63 & 64 Vict. c. 12) which, at the passing of the act, was on loan to the Commonwealth of Australia ceases to be included in the public records to which the Public Records Act 1958 (6 & 7 Eliz. 2. c. 51) applies. Section 2 of the act provides the short title. The preamble recites the request of the government of the Commonwealth of Australia that the copy should remain permanently in the keeping of the Commonwealth, and the willingness of the government of the United Kingdom to advise the Queen to accede to that request subject to the approval of Parliament.

The purpose of the act was to allow the Commonwealth of Australia to retain the original copy of the Commonwealth of Australia Constitution Act 1900 (63 & 64 Vict. c. 12). Thus the British Parliament passed a new act to exempt this copy from the requirements of the Public Records Act 1958 (6 & 7 Eliz. 2. c. 51), so as to allow the copy to remain with Australia as a gift.

The copy is now displayed in the Federation Gallery at the National Archives of Australia, in Canberra.

The 1990 legislation was opposed by the Keeper of Public Records, Michael Roper, who was in charge of the Public Record Office.
