= Barry Langford =

British television and music director (1926–2012)

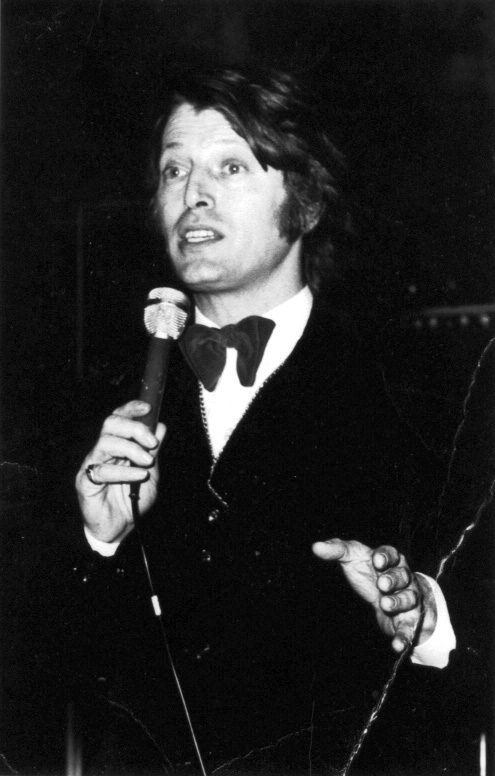
Barry Langford in 1964

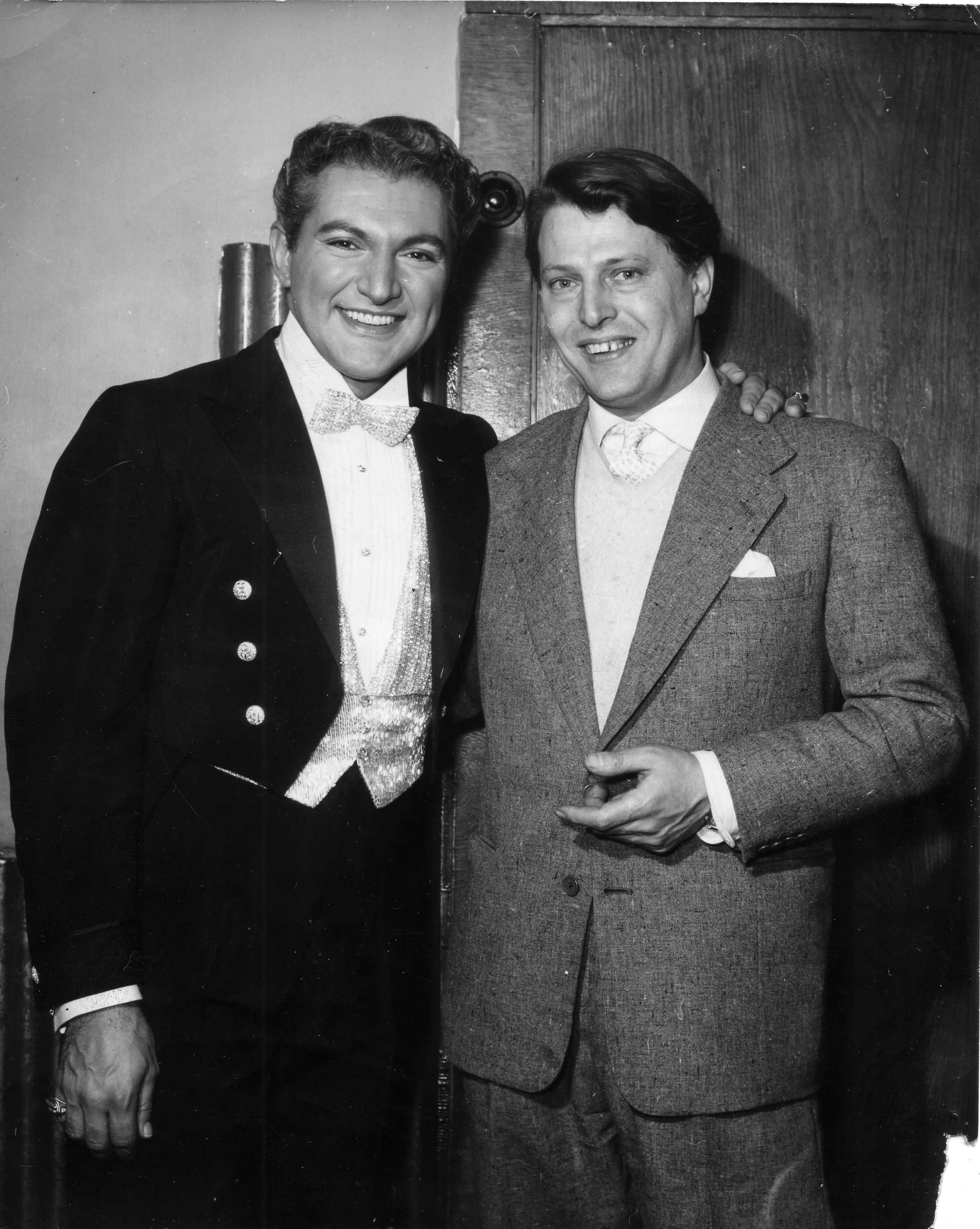
Barry Langford with Liberace in the Langford Silver Shop in London

Barry Langford (7 February 1926 – 25 July 2012) was a British television and music director, producer, and businessman. He directed many television programmes for the BBC in the 1960s and 1970s, and also worked as manager for musical artists including David Bowie and Tom Jones. He helped improve BBC television programming and also helped the development of Israeli television in the 1970s.

== Early life ==
Langford was born on 7 February 1926 in London, England. He was the older brother of Lawrence Langford (1927–2020), who created one of the world's largest collections of marine antiques and model ships.

Growing up in the UK, Langford lived a reportedly happy childhood with his younger brother Lawrence. Barry had shown an interest in music at an early age.

The Langford family moved repeatedly during Barry's childhood, his father Louis moving the family as he travelled from business to business. Barry's grades suffered as a result of switching several schools.

== Professional career ==
=== Early career ===
Prior to his career in television, Langford served in the British army in World War II when he became 18 years old. His family had a long history of professional entertainers—including musicians, whistlers, and stuntmen—and Langford worked at the Entertainments National Service Association, providing entertainment to the British Army during his period of service.

Barry's father, Louis Langford (whose surname was originally Lelyveld, being a native of the Netherlands), had run the family silver business during the war years. After the war, Louis retired, depositing his silver into the London Silver Vaults. Barry took over the family silver business after his father's retirement. Barry attempted in advertising the Chancellery Lane silver vaults to Americans, and his business grew as it became more retail-oriented. Success saw the business moving to Charles Street, with the new shop proving a good business headquarters for the Langford silver business. Celebrities such as Elizabeth Taylor, Liberace, and Ava Gardner were drawn to and became customers of his business.

Over time, Barry's began producing shows at Brighton Theatre. He was also featured as one of five citizens of London in the documentary Citizen 63 directed by John Boorman. His activities eventually caught the attention of entertainment mogul Lew Grade. The two eventually met, with Barry and Lew sharing similar tastes in entertainment style and direction. Lew guided Barry and set him on his course as a TV director.

=== British television and music industry ===
With the guidance of Lew Grade, Barry became a successful television programme director, despite having no previous professional experience. He directed "The Beat Room", a popular British pop programme, and other British pop shows, including the Juke Box Jury, "Dad, you're a square", "Exit, It's The Way Out", "Gadzooks, It's All Happening", and the Tom Jones BBC TV series. While producing in the music industry, he discovered David Bowie and helped launch Tom Jones' career, managing them both for a time. He also managed American singer P.J. Proby. Barry Langford was involved in the discovery of the Who, featuring them on the Beat Room and other programmes he produced and directed. Later in his career, he acted in or did screenwriting for various Israeli-made films.

== Personal life ==
Before his directing and producing career began, while still working in the Langford family silver business, Langford met Shirley Irene Hale (born Hersheson), the daughter of another silver dealer. The two married some time after and had two children, Jeremy and Caroline Langford. After leaving the silver business, the family travelled together, moving back and forth twice between Australia and the United Kingdom in 1965, 1967, and 1969, before finally settling in Israel in 1972. Langford became involved in the Israeli television and music industry, and he worked their until his retirement. Later in life, he and Shirley Hale divorced.

Langford was a first-class bridge player, having played professionally for Australian teams. He also became one of Israel's top players.

Langford died on 25 July 2012 in Israel.

=== Political activism ===
After being released from military service after World War II, Barry Langford became one of the early members of the 43 Group, along with Vidal Sassoon. The 43 Group was originally composed of 43 young British Jewish ex-servicemen who opposed the political organization and activities of Oswald Mosley and the Union Movement, Jeffrey Hamm's British League of Ex-Servicemen, and other British fascist organizations. Activities ranged from protests, breaking up far-right meetings, infiltrating different fascist parties and groups, to street fighting.

== See also ==
- Entertainments National Service Association
