= Cyril Flower =

Cyril Flower may refer to:

- Cyril Flower, 1st Baron Battersea (1843–1907), British politician and patron of art
- Cyril Flower (historian) (1879–1961), British historian and civil servant
