= Domus Conversorum =

Chapel in London, England

Coordinates: 51.5149°N 0.1111°W

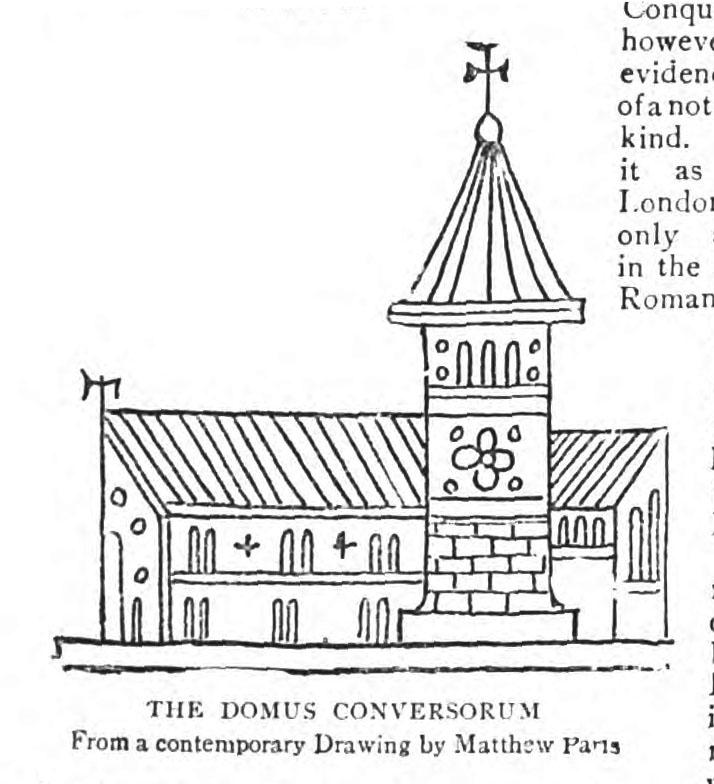
- The Domus Conversorum, from a 13th-century sketch by Matthew Paris

The Domus Conversorum ("House of the Converts"), later Chapel of the Master of the Rolls, was a building and institution in London for Jews who had converted to Christianity. It provided a communal home and low wages. It was needed because, until 1280, all Jews who converted to Christianity forfeited their possessions to the Crown.

It was established in 1232 by Henry III. With the expulsion of the Jews by Edward I in 1290, it became the only official way for Jews to remain in the country. At that stage there were about eighty residents. By 1356, the last one of these died. Between 1331 and 1608, 48 converts were admitted. The warden was the Master of the Rolls.

The building was in Chancery Lane. No records exist after 1609, but, in 1891, the post of chaplain was abolished by Act of Parliament and the location, by then known as the Rolls Chapel which had been used to store legal archives, became the Public Record Office. The site is today home to the Maughan Library of King's College London.

"Domus Conversorum" was sometimes used also to describe the living quarters of lay brothers in monasteries.

== The Domus Conversorum in Oxford ==
A Domus Conversorum was built in Oxford in around 1235. The building was demolished in 1750.

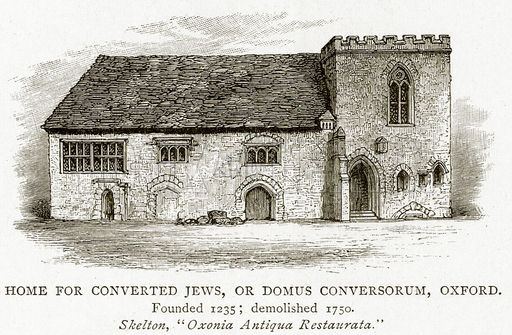
The Domus Conversorum in Oxford

== See also ==
- Crypto-Judaism
