= Public Records Act 1967 =

Act of the Parliament of the United Kingdom

Public Records Act 1967 (Note: Section 2(1).)
- Act of Parliament
- Parliament of the United Kingdom
- Long title: An Act to reduce the period of fifty years specified in section 5(1) of the Public Records Act 1958 as that for which certain public records must have been in existence for them to be available for public inspection.
- Citation: 1967 c. 44
- Territorial extent: United Kingdom

Dates
- Royal assent: 14 July 1967
- Commencement: 1 January 1968 (Note: Section 2(2).)
Other legislation
Amends	Public Records Act 1958

Status: Current legislation

Text of statute as originally enacted

Revised text of statute as amended

Text of the Public Records Act 1967 as in force today (including any amendments) within the United Kingdom, from legislation.gov.uk.

The Public Records Act 1967 (c. 44) is an act of the Parliament of the United Kingdom passed during Harold Wilson's Labour government.

The act amended the Public Records Act 1958 (6 & 7 Eliz. 2. c. 51) by reducing the period whereby public records (apart from those deemed "sensitive" by the Lord Chancellor) were closed to the public from fifty years to thirty years, the "thirty-year rule". It took effect on 1 January 1968.

The effect of the act was to make the public records of the First World War available, but the records from the Second World War did not become available until 1972.

== Subsequent developments ==
Section 5(1) of the Public Records Act 1958 (6 & 7 Eliz. 2. c. 51), as amended by section 1 of the act, was repealed by section 67 of, and paragraph 2(2) of schedule 5 to, the Freedom of Information Act 2000, which came into force on 1 January 2005.

== See also ==
- Public Record Office
