= Cyril Flower (historian) =

British historian and civil servant

Sir Cyril Thomas Flower, CB, FBA, FSA, FRHistS (31 March 1879 – 10 August 1961) was a British historian and civil servant. He was the Deputy Keeper of the Public Records, the de facto head of the Public Record Office, between 1938 and 1947.

== Early life and education ==
Flower was born in Warminster, Wiltshire, the only son of Thomas Flower, a doctor. He was the nephew of the academic and politician Henry Fawcett. Flower was educated at Lord Weymouth's Grammar School, St Edward's School, Oxford, and Worcester College, Oxford, where he took a first in Classical Moderations (1899) and a second in Literae humaniores in 1901.

== Career ==
Flower started working for the Public Record Office in 1903 and was called to the bar by the Inner Temple in 1906. In 1910, he began to work on the curia regis rolls, which he continued for the next fifty years, eventually publishing fourteen volumes of transcriptions of the rolls.

In 1914, Flower became private secretary to the director of contracts at the War Office. In 1915 he was commissioned into the Royal Garrison Artillery. In 1916 he and his battery went to France, where he was severely wounded in October. He returned to the War Office from 1917 to 1919.

Between 1926 and 1938 he was Secretary of the Public Record Office. In 1938 he was appointed deputy keeper of the Public Records by the Master of the Rolls. During World War II, he oversaw the evacuation, and the eventual reassembly, of the PRO's holdings. He retired in 1947. He was also a member of the Historical Manuscripts Commission between 1938 and 1960 and the acting director of Institute of Historical Research between 1939 and 1944.

== Honours ==
In 1919 Flower was awarded the Croix de guerre with palm. He was appointed CB in 1939 and knighted in 1946. He was elected to the British Academy in 1947.

== Family ==
In 1910 Flower married Helen Mary Harding, daughter of David Thompson, a retired inspector of schools in the Punjab. They had one daughter.
