= Family Records Centre =

English genealogical research center

Coordinates: 51°31′37″N 0°6′27″W

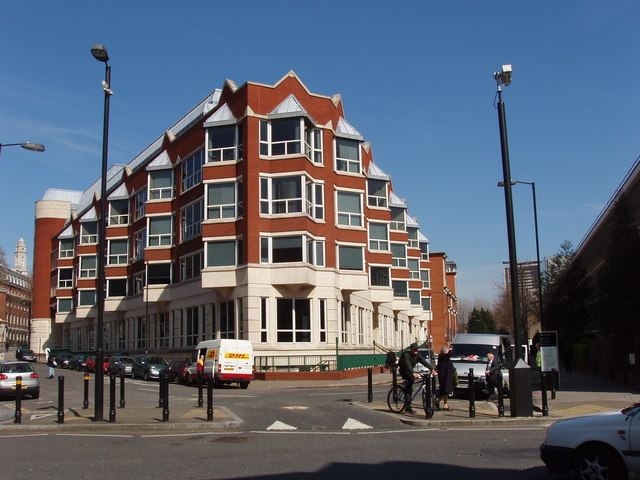
Taylor House, showing the FRC's main entrance on Myddleton Street (right) and a magistrates' court in the same building but accessed from Rosebery Avenue (left).

The Family Records Centre (FRC) provided access to family history research sources mainly for England and Wales. It was administered jointly by the General Register Office (GRO) and The National Archives. It opened in March 1997 and was fully operational by the following month. It was situated in Taylor House at 1 Myddelton Street, Clerkenwell, London, at that street's junction with Garnault Place and close to the London Metropolitan Archives. It closed in 2008.

Throughout the FRC, there was free access to a wide range of family history material, databases and internet websites. Staff were always available to provide help and advice on family history research and there were regular one-to-one family history surgeries and computer skills tutorials. Talks on family history topics took place every week and other events, including exhibitions and conferences, were organised. There were good facilities for customers with special needs, and there was a small bookshop next to the entrance on the ground floor and a refreshment area with vending machines and lockers for personal belongings in the basement.

Its main resources were indexes to civil registration of births, marriages and deaths on the ground floor (provided by the GRO), and the Victorian census returns on the first floor (provided by The National Archives).

== Births, Marriages & Deaths Indexes ==
The births, marriages and deaths indexes were in large, heavy, hardcover books (red covers for births, green for marriages and black for deaths) in three sections respectively, with each section arranged in date order. Using the details from an index, a copy (certificate) of the corresponding birth, marriage or death entry could be applied for at the cashiers' section on the same floor. Other indexes at the FRC included some births, marriages and deaths of British nationals which took place abroad from 1761, indexes of legal adoptions in England & Wales from 1927 onwards, and various indexes of war deaths in the armed forces in South Africa, both World Wars and elsewhere.

The births, marriages and deaths indexes were originally at Somerset House until the 1970s. In the early 1980s, the births and marriages indexes were at St Catherine's House, at the northeast corner of the intersection of Kingsway and Aldwych, and the deaths indexes were at Alexandra House, farther up Kingsway. After more space was made available at St Catherine's House, the deaths indexes were moved from Alexandra House. Finally, they were all moved to the FRC in 1997.

== Census returns for England and Wales ==
The 1841 to 1901 census returns for England and Wales could be consulted at the FRC and were accessed mainly online by searching for individuals by name. The 1841 to 1891 census returns were also available on microfilm, while the 1901 census was also available on microfiche. A selection of street indexes and other search aids were also available.

Before the FRC opened, the census microfilms were at the Public Record Office (now part of the National Archives) in Chancery Lane for some years, after having been moved from the Land Registry building, Portugal Street, London, where they had been since the mid-1970s.

== Other microfilm resources ==
Other microfilm resources available included wills and administrations from the Prerogative Court of Canterbury up to 1858, which could also be searched online, death duty registers, from 1796 to 1858, and many nonconformist registers (mainly pre-1837).

== Demise ==
On 21 June 2006, it was announced that the National Archives' staff and residual services at the FRC would be relocating to the National Archives at Kew by the end of 2008. Official press releases were vague about plans for the births, marriages and deaths indexes housed on the ground floor. During October 2007 the index volumes in question were progressively removed from public access to a closed archive in Christchurch, Dorset.

The closure date was later brought forward to early 2008. The ground floor (GRO section) of the FRC closed on 27 October 2007 and the rest of the FRC closed on 15 March 2008. As of 2010 Taylor House was being refurbished by property developers Derwent London; the lower ground floor had been pre-let to nearby City University for twenty years at £1.2m per year. The second floor now has twenty courtrooms where Immigration and Asylum Tribunal cases are heard.
