= London Silver Vaults =

Silver vaults and marketplace in London

Coordinates: 51.5175°N 0.1129°W

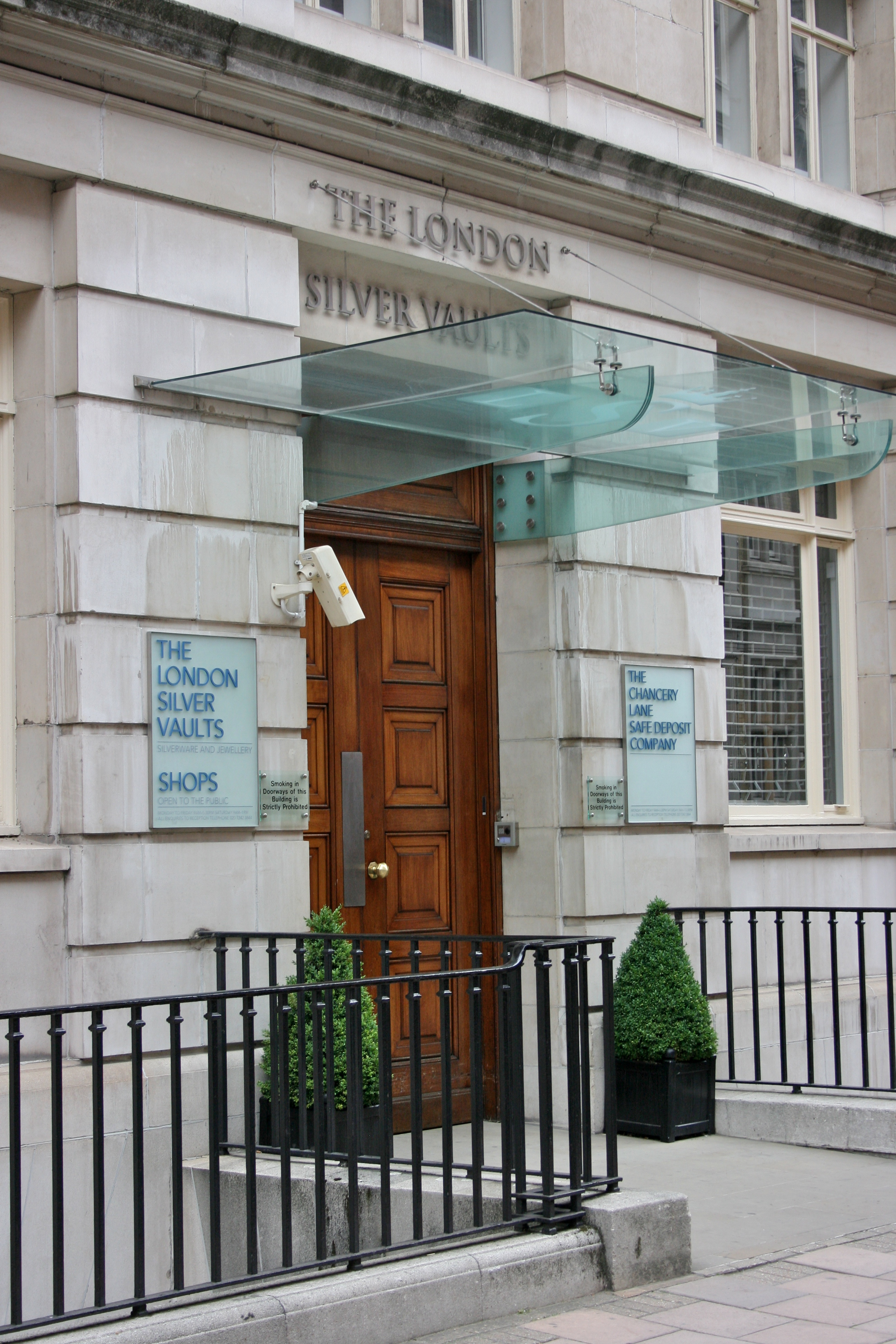
The entrance to the present day London Silver Vaults

The London Silver Vaults, open to the public, is a subterranean marketplace that is home to the largest collection of silver for sale to the public in the world. The 'vaults' are in fact shops, many of which have been owned by the same families for generations. The dealers are all specialists in their field and can offer a wealth of information on a wide range of silverware for sale, from antiques dating from the 1600s to contemporary silver designers. The vaults are also home to a luxury watch dealer, a stamp dealer and a vintage designer handbag shop.

The address of the vaults is Chancery Lane, London, WC2A 1QS but the entrance, a rather non-descript door, is actually on a small side road called Southampton Buildings. The vaults have been visited by celebrities since flamboyant pianist, Liberace, shopped for candelabra in the 1950s. More recently JK Rowling (under her nom-de-plume Robert Galbraith) used the London Silver Vaults as inspiration for her Cormoran Strike novel 'The Hallmarked Man' and the vaults play a role in the story.

The London Silver Vaults originally started life in the 19th century as a secure storage company, renting strong rooms to hold household silver, jewellery and documents. It transitioned to housing silver dealers in secure premises a few years later. One vault was used to store a farthing, with the owner paying over £100 over the years for the vault.

With 1.2-metre (3.9 ft) thick walls lined with steel, the vaults were never broken into. The building above the vaults was struck directly with a bomb during World War II – however, this did not damage the vaults at all, despite the building being destroyed.

A new building, Chancery House, was constructed ten years later, and since 1953 it has been in its present format, with shops based underground. All of the shops have been owned for at least 50 years by the same families. It is said that it has "the largest single collection of silver for sale in the world", contained within more than forty shops.
