= Lelyveld =

Lelyveld is a surname. Notable people with this surname include:

- Arthur Lelyveld (1913–1996), American rabbi and activist
- Dave Lelyveld (fl. 1997–present), more commonly known as "Dave Wittenberg", South African-American voice actor
- Joseph Lelyveld (1937–2024), American journalist
