= Public Record Office =

UK national archive service, 1838 to 2003

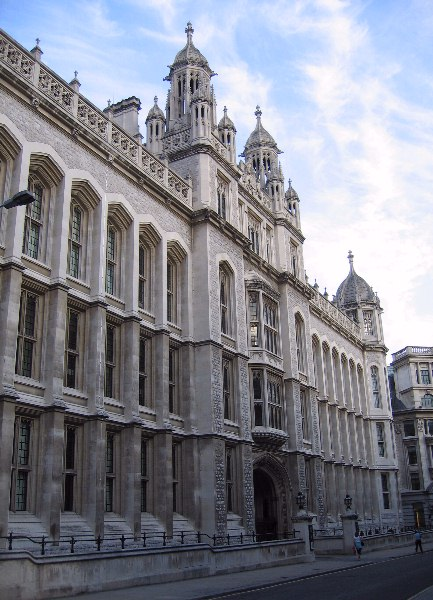
- Entrance of the Public Record Office on Chancery Lane, now the Maughan Library, King's College London

General information
- Type: National archive
- Architectural style: Neo-Gothic
- Location: City of London, London, United Kingdom
- Coordinates: 51.5153°N 0.1106°W
- Construction started: 1851

Design and construction
- Architect: Sir James Pennethorne

The Public Record Office (Note: Not "Public Records Office") (abbreviated as PRO, pronounced as three letters and referred to as the PRO), Chancery Lane in the City of London, was the guardian of the national archives of the United Kingdom from 1838 until 2003, when it was merged with the Historical Manuscripts Commission to form The National Archives, based in Kew. It was under the control of the Master of the Rolls, a senior judge. The Public Record Office still exists as a legal entity, as the enabling legislation has not been modified.

== History ==
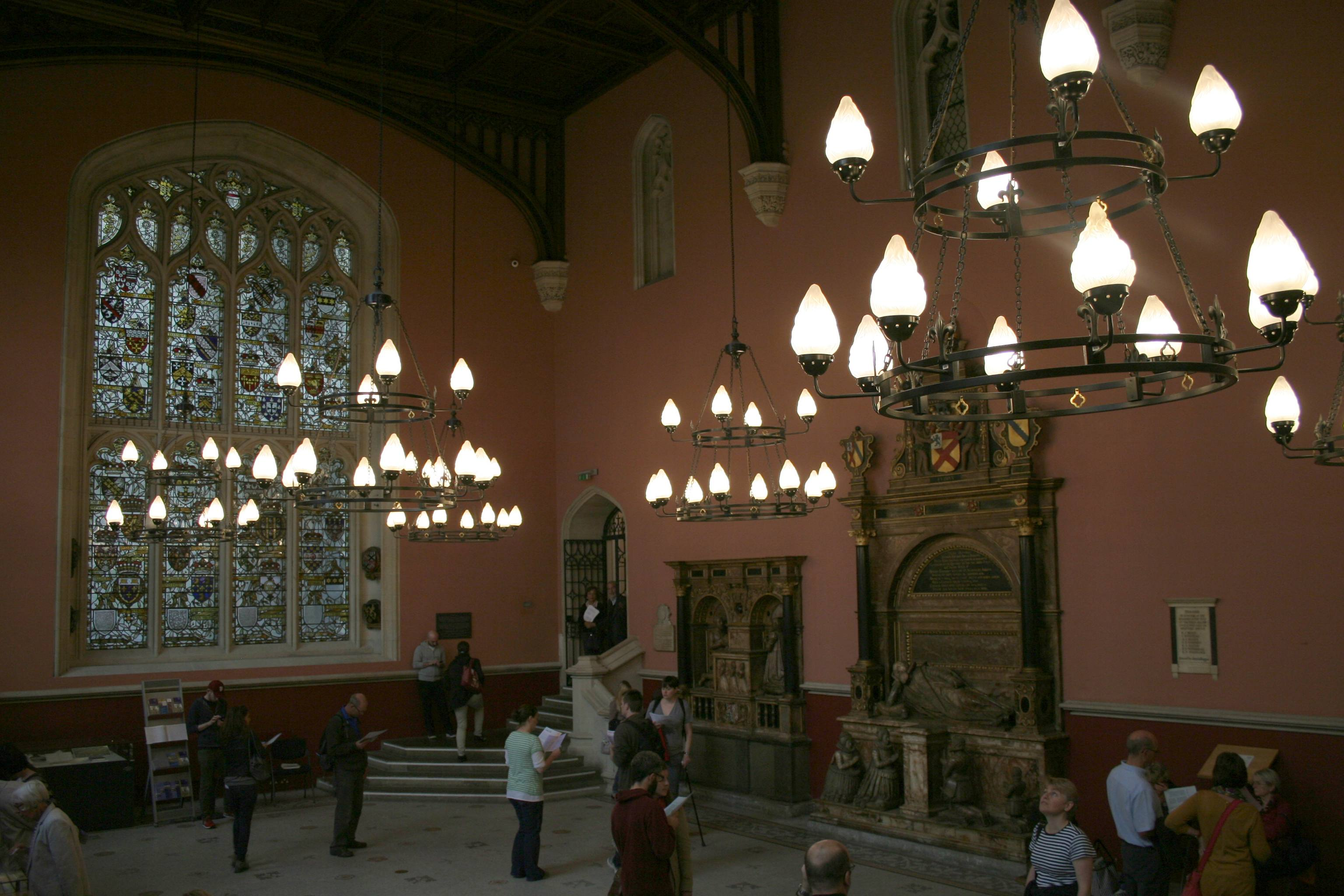
Surviving part of the Rolls Chapel, now the "Weston Room" of the Maughan Library, King's College London, viewed in 2013

=== 19th century ===
Public Record Office Act 1838 (Note: The citation of this act by this short title was authorised by section 1 of, and the first schedule to, the Short Titles Act 1896. Due to the repeal of those provisions it is now authorised by section 19(2) of the Interpretation Act 1978.)
- Act of Parliament
- Parliament of the United Kingdom
- Long title: An Act for keeping safely the Public Records.
- Citation: 1 & 2 Vict. c. 94
- Territorial extent: United Kingdom

Dates
- Royal assent: 14 August 1838
- Commencement: 14 August 1838 (Note: The Acts of Parliament (Commencement) Act 1793.)
- Repealed: 1 January 1959
Other legislation
Amended by	Forgery Act 1913; Statute Law Revision Act 1950
Repealed by	Public Records Act 1958
Relates to	Chancery Regulation Act 1833; Court of Chancery Act 1841

Status: Repealed

Text of statute as originally enacted

The Record Commissions were a series of six royal commissions of Great Britain and (from 1801) the United Kingdom which sat between 1800 and 1837 to inquire into the custody and public accessibility of the state archives. The commissions emphasised the poor conditions and variety of places in which records were held. As a result, the Public Record Office Act 1838 (1 & 2 Vict. c. 94) was passed to "keep safely the public records".

The act established the Public Record Office, a non-ministerial department under the keepership of the Master of the Rolls, a senior judge whose job originally had included responsibility for keeping the records of the Court of Chancery, who appointed a Deputy Keeper as Chief Record Keeper. The first Master of the Rolls to take on this responsibility was Lord Langdale (d.1851) although his Deputy Keeper, the historian Sir Francis Palgrave (who wrote a voluminous work on ancient writs, many of which were housed in the PRO), had full-time responsibility for running the Office.

The Office's original premises were the mediaeval Rolls Chapel (the former Domus Conversorum, a chapel for Jews who had converted to Christianity), on Chancery Lane at the western extremity of the City of London, near the border with the City of Westminster.

Some of the records were court or departmental archives (established for several centuries) which were well-run and had good or adequate catalogues; others were little more than store-rooms. Many of the professional staff of these individual archives simply continued their existing work in the new institution. Many documents were transferred from the Tower of London and the Chapter House of Westminster Abbey, though Domesday Book was not moved from Westminster Abbey until 1859, when proper storage had been prepared.

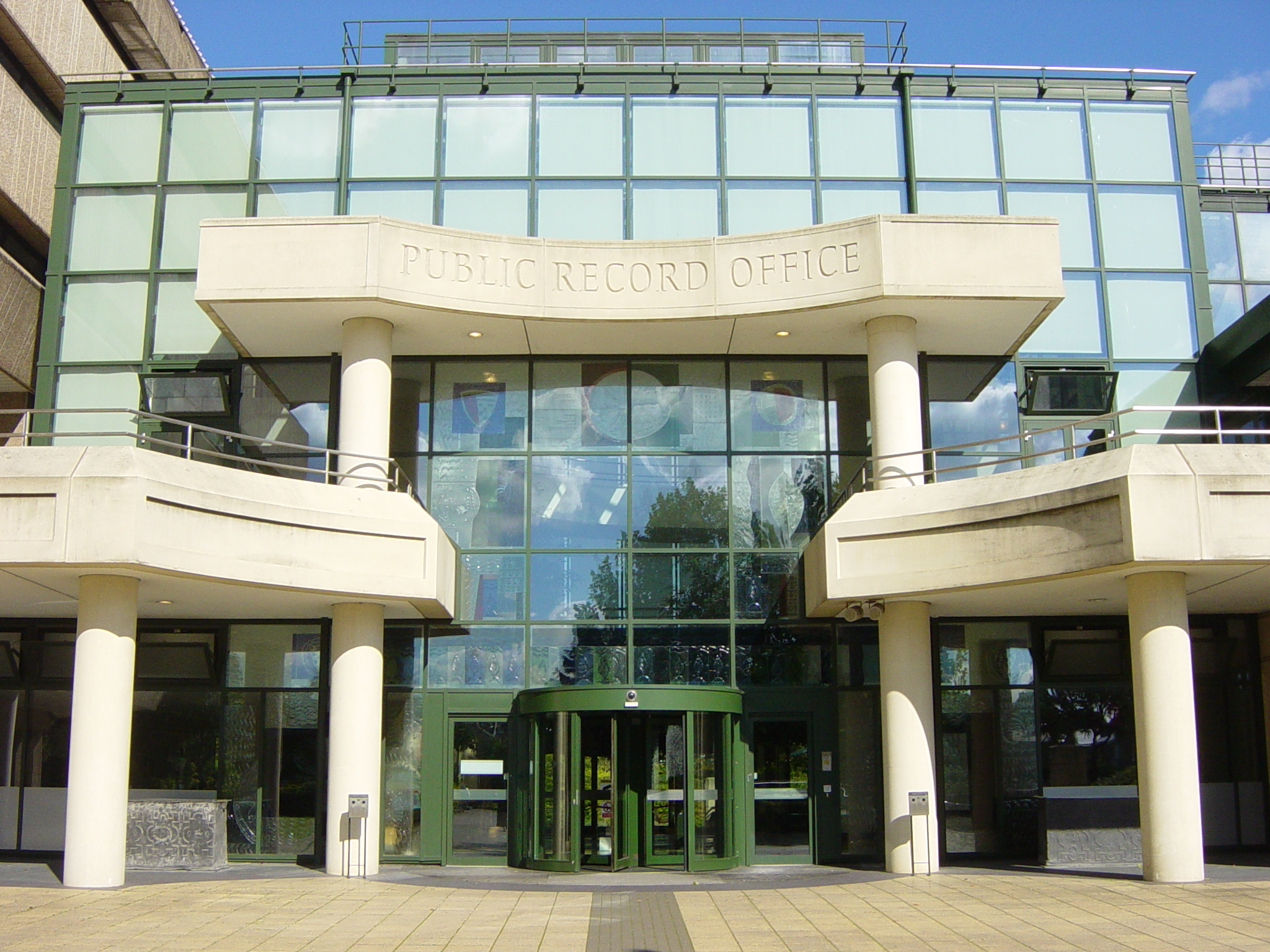
The Kew building photographed in 2002, shortly before the name change to The National Archives

Until 1852 no right existed for the general public to consult the records freely, even for scholarly purposes, despite the intention of the Public Record Office Act 1838 to enable public access. Fees were payable by lawyers who in return were permitted to consult a limited number of documents. These charges were abolished for serious historical and literary researchers after a petition was signed in 1851 by 83 people including Charles Dickens and the historians Lord Macaulay and Thomas Carlyle.

Between 1851 and 1858 a purpose-built archive repository was built next to the Rolls Chapel, to the design of the architect Sir James Pennethorne, and following the chapel's demolition due to structural unsoundness, was extended onto that original site between 1895 and 1900.

=== 20th century ===
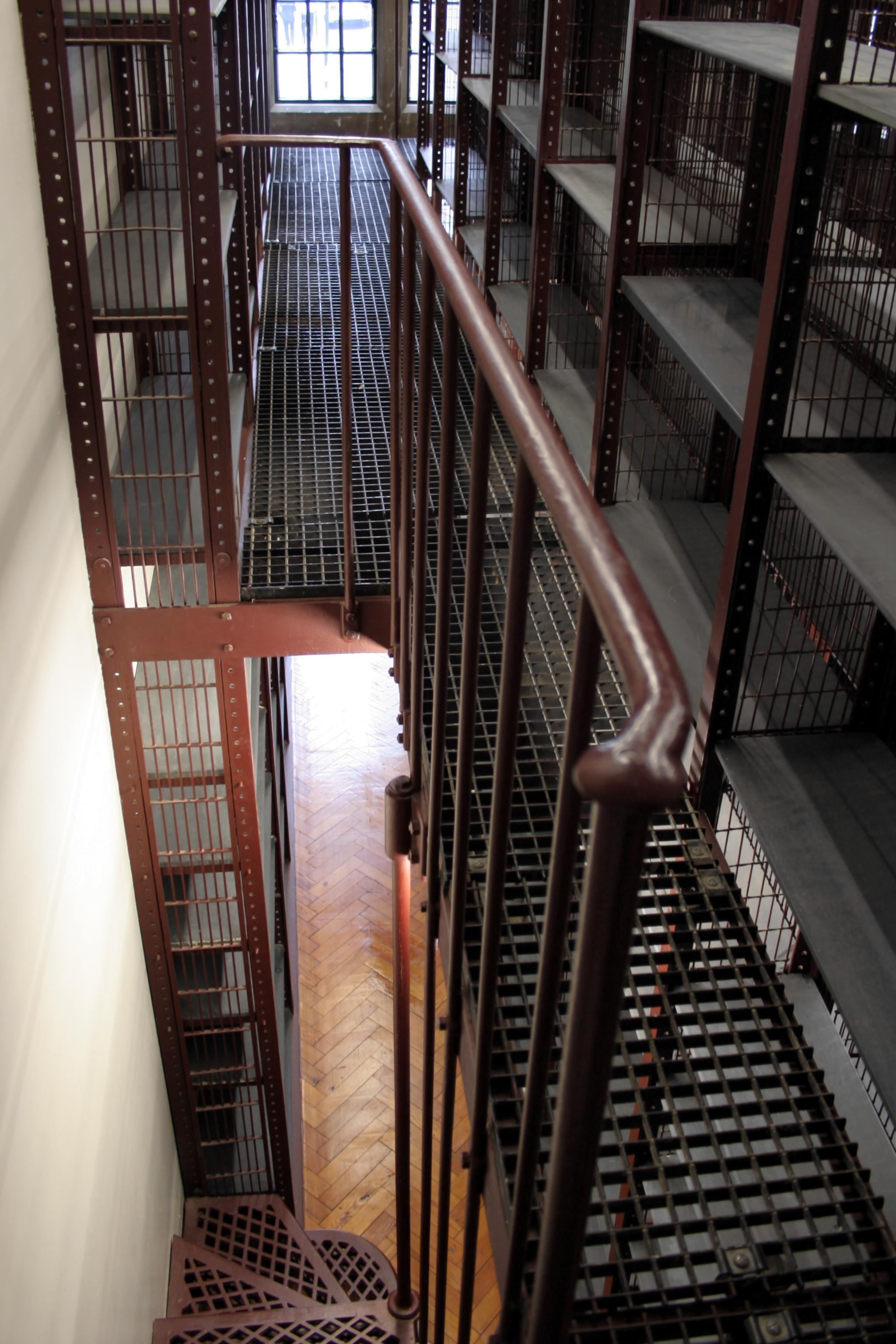
An original cell of the Public Record Office at the Maughan Library

The growing size of the archives held by the PRO and by government departments led to the Public Records Act 1958, which sought to avoid the indiscriminate retention of huge numbers of documents by establishing standard selection procedures for the identification of those documents of sufficient historical importance to be kept by the PRO. Even so, growing interest in the records produced a need for the Office to expand, and in 1977 a second building was opened at Kew in south-west London. The Kew building was expanded in the 1990s and by 1997 all records had been transferred from Chancery Lane either to Kew or to the Family Records Centre in Islington, North London. The Chancery Lane building was acquired by King's College London in 2001, and is now the Maughan Library, the university's largest library.

=== Merger with the Historical Manuscripts Commission ===
In April 2003 the PRO merged with the Historical Manuscripts Commission (HMC) to form The National Archives. The HMC moved from its previous office, also located off Chancery Lane, to Kew in 2004. The National Archives of Scotland and the Public Record Office of Northern Ireland were and remain separate institutions.

== Functions ==
The archive held the official collection of records of public business for England, Wales and the central UK government, including the records of court proceedings going back to the Middle Ages, and the original manuscript of Domesday Book.

== Public access ==
Under the 1958 act, most documents held by the PRO were kept "closed" (or secret) for 50 years: under an amending act of 1967 this period was reduced to 30 years (the so-called "thirty year rule"). These provisions changed significantly when the UK's Freedom of Information Act 2000 came into full effect in 2005: the 30 year rule was abolished and closed records in The National Archives became subject to the same access controls as other records of public authorities. Some records do remain closed for longer periods, however: individual census returns, for example, are kept closed for 100 years.

== Deputy Keepers and Keepers ==
From 1838 to 1958 the nominal head of the office, known as the Keeper of the Records, was the Master of the Rolls of the day. The chief executive officer who oversaw the office's day-to-day operations was known as the Deputy Keeper of the Records. Deputy Keepers from 1838 to 1958 were:

- 1838–1861: Sir Francis Palgrave
- 1861–1878: (Sir) Thomas Duffus Hardy
- 1878–1886: (Sir) William Hardy
- 1886–1926: (Sir) Henry Maxwell Lyte
- 1926–1938: Alfred Edward Stamp
- 1938–1947: (Sir) Cyril Thomas Flower
- 1947–1954: (Sir) Hilary Jenkinson
- 1954–1958: (Sir) David Lewis Evans

The 1958 act transferred responsibility for the PRO from the Master of the Rolls to the Lord Chancellor; and the title of the chief executive was changed to Keeper of Public Records. The Keepers from 1958 to 2003 were:

- 1958–1960: Sir David Lewis Evans
- 1960–1966: Stephen Wilson
- 1966–1970: Harold Cottam Johnson
- 1970–1978: Jeffery Raymond Ede
- 1978–1982: Alfred Mabbs
- 1982–1988: Geoffrey Martin
- 1988–1991: Michael Roper
- 1991–2003: Sarah Tyacke (became Chief Executive of The National Archives, and retired 2005)
