= Royal Commission on Historical Manuscripts =

Former UK commission subsumed by the National Archives (1869–2003)

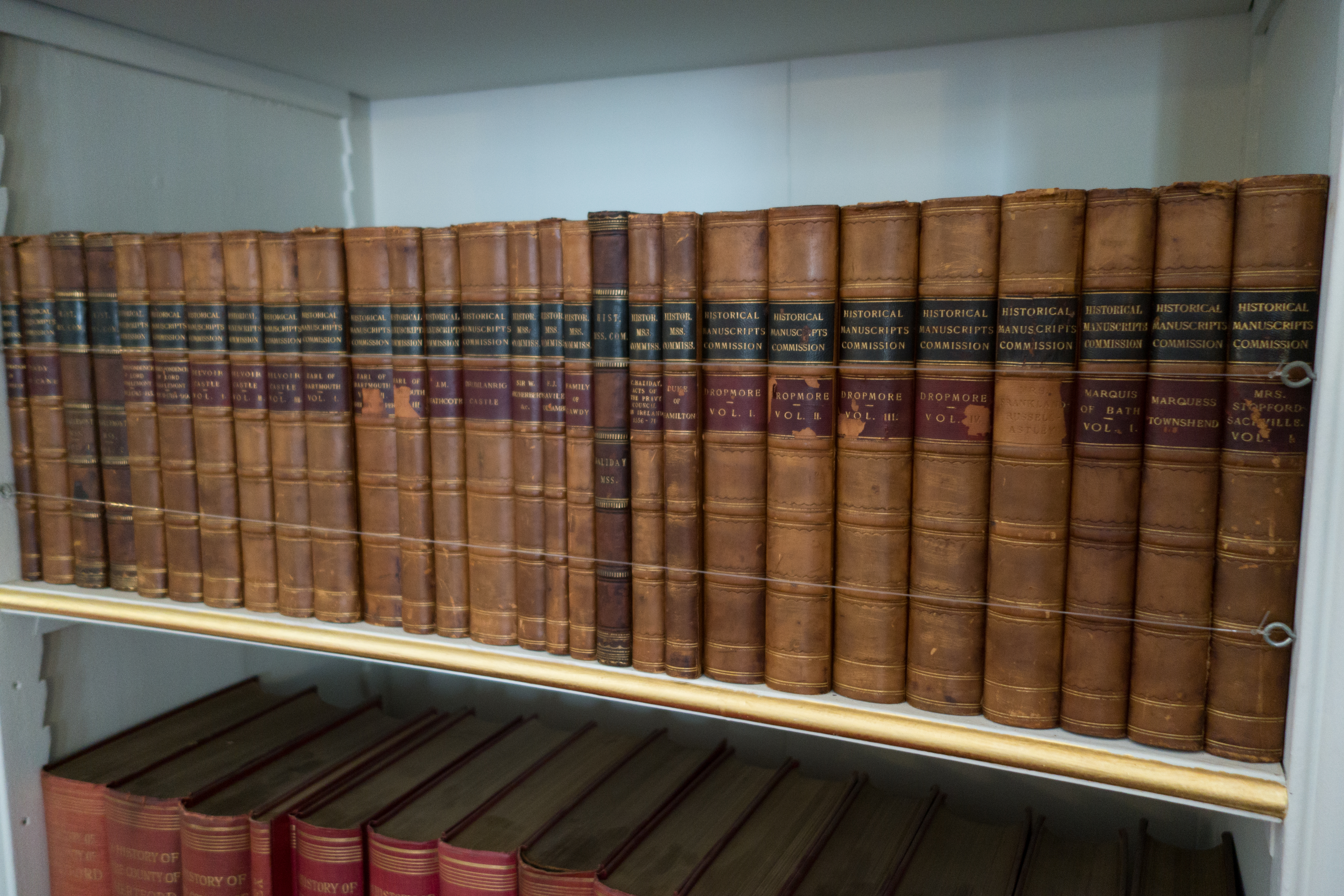
A set of bound HMC reports at Kenwood House, London

The Royal Commission on Historical Manuscripts (widely known as the Historical Manuscripts Commission, and abbreviated as the HMC to distinguish it from the Royal Commission on the Historical Monuments of England), was a United Kingdom Royal Commission established in 1869 to survey and report on privately owned and privately held archival records of general historical interest. Its brief was "to make inquiry as to the places in which such Manuscripts and Papers were deposited", and to report on their contents. It remained in existence until 2003, when it merged with the Public Record Office to form The National Archives. Although it technically survives as a legal entity, its work is now entirely subsumed into that of The National Archives.

== History ==
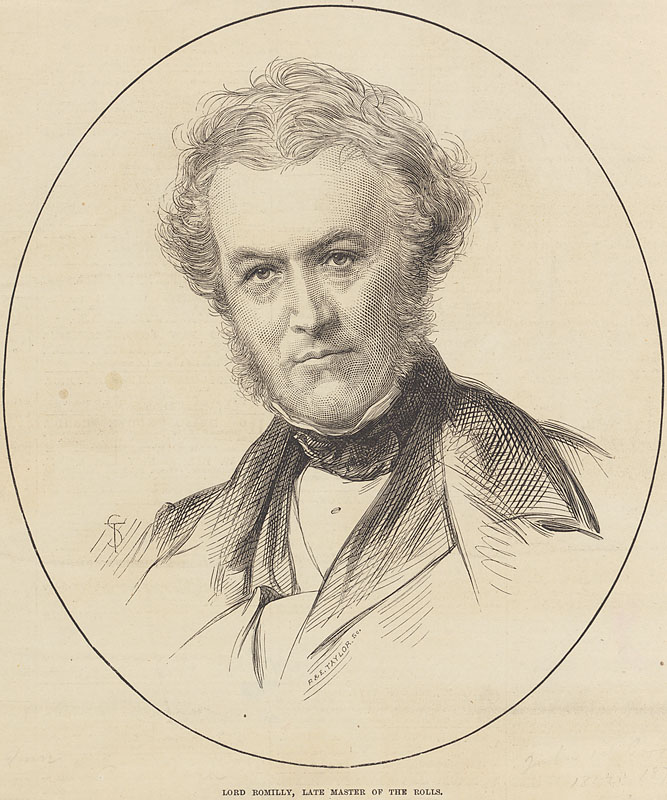
John, 1st Baron Romilly, Master of the Rolls 1851–1873

Following the passing of the Public Record Office Act 1838, which made statutory provision for the care of government archives, pressure began to grow for the state to pay attention to privately owned records. Largely on the initiative of Lord Romilly, the Master of the Rolls, the first Royal Commission on Historical Manuscripts was appointed by Royal Warrant dated 2 April 1869. The first Commissioners were Romilly himself (as chairman); the Marquess of Salisbury; the Earl of Airlie; Earl Stanhope; Lord Edmοnd Petty-Fitzmaurice; Sir William Stirling-Maxwell; Charles Russell, President of Maynooth College; George Webbe Dasent; and T. D. Hardy, Deputy Keeper of the Records. They were shortly afterwards joined by George Butler, Bishop of Limerick; and Lord Talbot de Malahide. A new Royal Warrant of 1876 confirmed the appointment of what had effectively become a standing commission; and the Commission's work was extended by further warrants dated 18 December 1897 and 27 March 1919.

Four inspectors (including H. T. Riley) were appointed in 1869 to survey records under the Commissioners' direction. Later inspectors included Henry Maxwell Lyte, John Knox Laughton, Joseph Stevenson, Reginald Lane Poole, W. D. Macray, J. K. Laughton, Horatio Brown, W. J. Hardy and John Gwenogvryn Evans.

Throughout the 19th and early 20th century the Commission remained closely associated with the Public Record Office: indeed, in 1912 it was stated that "for all practical purposes the Commission itself may be regarded as a branch of the Record Office". However, in the wake of the Public Records Act 1958 (which transferred responsibility for public records to the Lord Chancellor, while the Commission remained under the authority of the Master of the Rolls) the two bodies diverged to achieve a greater degree of independence from one another. A new Royal Warrant, dated 5 December 1959, gave the Commission revised and greatly extended terms of reference. Over the next few decades the Secretaries to the Commission included Roger Ellis, 1957–72, Godfrey Davis, 1972–82, Brian Smith, 1982–92 and Christopher Kitching, 1992–2004.

This period of independence ended in April 2003, when another Royal Warrant effectively merged the Commission with the PRO to form the new National Archives. The Chief Executive and Keeper of Public Records is now the sole Historical Manuscripts Commissioner, while the role of Secretary of the Commission is combined with that of Head of Archives Sector Development. Since the creation of The National Archives the role of Secretary of the Commission has been filled by Nicholas Kingsley, 2005–15 and Isobel Hunter, 2015–date.

== Publications ==
Until 1945, the principal medium through which the Commission disseminated its findings was publication: thereafter, it developed other channels of communication (notably the National Register of Archives: see below), but publication always remained important.

Throughout its existence, the Commission published periodical reports to the Crown in the form of command papers. The reports themselves were relatively brief and conventional, but in the early years they were accompanied by lengthy appendixes comprising detailed descriptions of the archival collections that had been inspected, in a combination of lists, calendars and transcripts of selected documents. The first such report was published, as a folio volume, in 1870: the appendix included reports on the manuscript collections of 44 corporate bodies and 36 private owners in England, Wales, Scotland and Ireland, and one located overseas (English manuscripts at Heidelberg University). Eight further reports, with increasingly detailed appendixes, were issued over the following years, the ninth and last in folio format appearing in 1883–4. Although the contents of many of the appendixes have been superseded by more comprehensive publications and finding aids, this is not invariably the case, and a number of the early reports continue to be used by researchers.

From its 10th report (1885) onwards the Commission switched to an octavo format, although it continued to include significant material in appendixes down to the 15th report (1899). In the same period, however, it began to publish its more detailed reports on collections as separate octavo volumes (or, in many cases, multi-volume series), with the material predominantly presented in calendar form. Over the next century it published some 200 such volumes before the series was discontinued: the final volume (the fifth in a series on the papers of the Finch family) appeared in 2004.

In 1968 the Commission published a general survey of the papers of 19th-century United Kingdom Prime Ministers; and this was followed (between 1971 and 1985) by six volumes of editions of selected papers of Gladstone, Wellington and Palmerston.

Between 1982 and 2003, the Commission published twelve thematic volumes in its series Guides to Sources for British History, based in part on the contents of the National Register of Archives (see below). Topics covered included the papers of British cabinet ministers; of British colonial governors; of the British textile, leather and metal-processing industries; and of British antiquaries and historians.

Between 1962 and 1980, the Commission entered into partnerships with local record societies to publish 27 volumes of editions and calendars of significant manuscripts, in what was called its Joint Publications series.

In 1964, the Commission first published its Record Repositories in Great Britain, a geographical directory to publicly accessible national, local and specialist archive repositories. This was regularly updated and reissued in revised editions, and became a standard resource for researchers. The last edition was the 11th, published in 1999: it has now been superseded by the online ARCHON directory maintained by The National Archives.

== National Register of Archives ==
The National Register of Archives (NRA) was established by the Commission in 1945, following the recommendations of the report on British Records after the War published by the British Records Association in 1943. It was designed as a central register, accessible to researchers, of the nature and location of local and private archives and manuscripts relating to British history; and it rapidly grew in the post-War years to become the principal medium through which the Commission accumulated and disseminated information about archives.

The NRA consists of a collection of published and unpublished lists and catalogues of archival collections. Some have been compiled by the Commission's own staff, but the majority are copies of lists compiled by the local and other repositories in which the records are held. The Register also includes placename and personal name indexes to these lists, as well as some basic subject indexes. The hard-copy Register is now located at The National Archives; while the indexes, originally compiled in manual form, but which began to be entered onto a database from about 1980, are now incorporated into The National Archives' "Discovery" catalogue.

== Manorial Documents Register ==
The Manorial Documents Register (MDR) is a central register recording the nature and location of English and Welsh manorial archives. It was originally set up by the Master of the Rolls in 1926 (in the aftermath of the Law of Property Act 1922 and Law of Property Amendment Act 1924), and was initially maintained by the Public Record Office. Under the terms of the 1959 Royal Warrant responsibility for it was transferred to the HMC; and since 2003 it has been maintained by The National Archives. The hard-copy Register is in the process of being computerised: those parts which have been completed are available online.

== Location ==
Until 1959 the Commission was based in the Public Record Office building. In December of that year it moved into its own offices (albeit at no great distance away) at Quality House, Quality Court, Chancery Lane. The general public were able to visit Quality House during regular office hours to consult the NRA, MDR and other resources.

Quality House was vacated towards the end of 2003, when the Commission's staff and resources relocated to The National Archives building at Kew.

== See also ==
- Record Commission
- Historiography of the United Kingdom

== Bibliography ==
- Cantwell, John D. (1991). The Public Record Office, 1838–1958. London: HMSO. ISBN 0114402248.
- Ellis, Roger H. (1962). "The Historical Manuscripts Commission, 1869–1969". Journal of the Society of Archivists. 2 (6): 233–42. doi:10.1080/00379816009513740. S2CID 110091784.
- Ellis, Roger H. (1969). "The Historical Manuscripts Commission: a short history and explanation". Manuscripts and Men. London: Her Majesty's Stationery Office. pp. 1–39.
- Shepherd, Elizabeth (2009). Archives and Archivists in 20th Century England. Farnham: Ashgate. pp. 71–81. ISBN 9780754647850.
