= Public Records Act 1958 =

Act of the Parliament of the United Kingdom

Public Records Act 1958 (Note: Section 13(1).)
- Act of Parliament
- Parliament of the United Kingdom
- Long title: An Act to make new provision with respect to public records and the Public Record Office, and for connected purposes.
- Citation: 6 & 7 Eliz. 2. c. 51
- Territorial extent: United Kingdom

Dates
- Royal assent: 23 July 1958
- Commencement: 1 January 1959 (Note: Section 13(3).)

Other legislation
- Amends: Court of Chancery Act 1841; Merchant Shipping Act 1894; Forgery Act 1913; Supreme Court of Judicature (Consolidation) Act 1925; Public Records (Scotland) Act 1937; Coal Industry Nationalisation Act 1946; Emergency Laws (Miscellaneous Provisions) Act 1953
- Repeals/revokes: Court of Chancery Act 1841; Public Record Office Act 1877; Public Record Office Act 1898
- Amended by: Transport Act 1968; Administration of Justice Act 1970; Courts Act 1971; Civil Aviation Act 1971; Local Government Act 1972; Northern Ireland Constitution Act 1973; Statute Law (Repeals) Act 1973; Legal Aid Act 1974; Statute Law (Repeals) Act 1974; Supply Powers Act 1975; Statute Law (Repeals) Act 1977; Agricultural Statistics Act 1979; Film Levy Finance Act 1981; Statute Law (Repeals) Act 1981; Forgery and Counterfeiting Act 1981; Senior Courts Act 1981; National Heritage Act 1983; Coal Industry Act 1987; Copyright, Designs and Patents Act 1988; Statute Law (Repeals) Act 1989; Coal Industry Act 1994; Government of Wales Act 1998; Postal Services Act 2000; Freedom of Information Act 2000; Countryside and Rights of Way Act 2000; Horserace Betting and Olympic Lottery Act 2004; Human Tissue Act 2004; Statute Law (Repeals) Act 2004; Public Records Act 1958 (Admissibility of Electronic Copies of Public Records) Order 2001; Constitutional Reform Act 2005; Civil Partnership Act 2004 (Overseas Relationships and Consequential, etc. Amendments) Order 2005; National Lottery Act 2006; Government of Wales Act 2006; National Health Service (Consequential Provisions) Act 2006; Child Maintenance and Other Payments Act 2008; Constitutional Reform and Governance Act 2010; Postal Services Act 2011; Statute Law (Repeals) Act 2013; Transfer of Functions (Information and Public Records) Order 2015; Policing and Crime Act 2017; Trade Act 2021; Employment Rights Act 2025
- Relates to: Oxford University Act 1860

Status: Amended

Text of statute as originally enacted

Revised text of statute as amended

Text of the Public Records Act 1958 as in force today (including any amendments) within the United Kingdom, from legislation.gov.uk.

The Public Records Act 1958 (6 & 7 Eliz. 2. c. 51) is an act of the Parliament of the United Kingdom forming the main legislation governing public records in the United Kingdom.

It established a cohesive regulatory framework for public records at the Public Record Office and other places of deposit. It also transferred responsibility for public records from the Master of the Rolls to the Lord Chancellor. The act stipulated that records would be transferred to the Public Record Office 30 years after creation and that most would be opened 50 years after creation. Subsection 3(4) of the act allowed government departments to retain records that were either still in use 30 years after creation or were of special sensitivity, such as intelligence agency materials and weapons of mass destruction information. The time of opening was subsequently reduced to 30 years by the Public Records Act 1967 and then access was completely redefined as being on creation, unless subject to an exemption, by the Freedom of Information Act 2000.

== Background ==
The "Report of the Select Committee on Public Records" in 1838 was the first attempt to centralize public record keeping in the United Kingdom.

The Public Records Act 1967 amended the Public Records Act 1958 by reducing the period whereby public records (apart from those deemed "sensitive" by the Lord Chancellor) were closed to the public from fifty years to thirty years. It took effect on 1 January 1968. In 2013, it was further reduced from 30 years to 20 years.

== Australian Constitution (Public Record Copy) Act 1990 ==
The Australian Constitution (Public Record Copy) Act 1990 was passed on the request of Australia to allow the original copy of the Commonwealth of Australia Constitution Act 1900 to be permanently removed from the Public Records Office and given to Australia. The UK government agreed as a gift to celebrate the bicentenary of British settlement in Australia.

== Subsequent developments ==
Section 13(2) of, and schedule 4 to, the act, together with the entry in schedule 3 relating to the Public Records (Scotland) Act 1937, were repealed by section 1 of, and part XI of the schedule to, the Statute Law (Repeals) Act 1974, which came into force on 27 June 1974.

== See also ==
- Freedom of Information Act 2000
- Constitutional Reform and Governance Act 2010
