= Chancery Lane =

London street in the ward of Farringdon Without

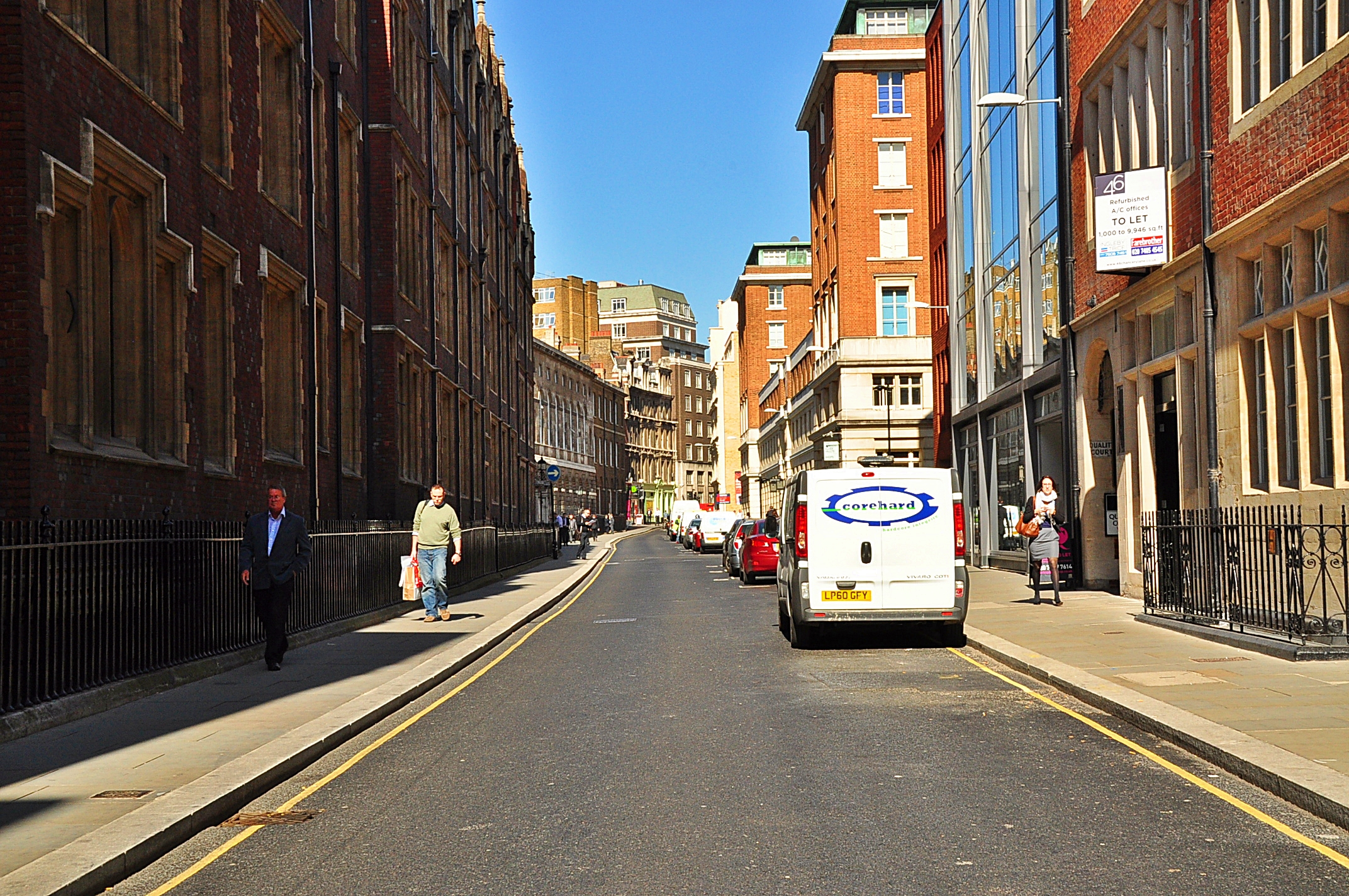
- Length: 0.3 mi (0.48 km)
- Location: London, United Kingdom
- Postal code: WC2, EC4
- Nearest Tube station: Chancery Lane
- Coordinates: 51.5162°N 0.1121°W (approximate midpoint)
- South end: Fleet Street
- To: High Holborn

Other
- Known for: Legal profession

Chancery Lane is a one-way street that forms part of the western boundary of the City of London. The east side of the street is entirely within the City, whilst the west side is in the City of Westminster south of Carey Street and the London Borough of Camden north of that street. The route originated as a 'new lane' created by the Knights Templar from their original 'old Temple' on the site of the present Southampton Buildings on Holborn, in order to access to their newly acquired property to the south of Fleet Street (the present Temple) sometime before 1161.

Chancery Lane, numbered the B400 in the British road numbering scheme, connects Fleet Street at its southern origin with High Holborn. It gives its name to Chancery Lane Underground station which lies at the junction of Holborn and Gray's Inn Road, a short distance from Chancery Lane's northern end.

Historically, the street was associated with the legal profession, an association which continues to the present day; however, consulting firms, ancillary businesses and the Maughan Library also occupy the street. Lincoln's Inn occupies most of the western side north of Carey Street. The side of the street that falls in the City of London is situated in the ward of Farringdon Without. Local government boundaries were changed considerably in this area in 1994 – previously only a small part of the street, on its southern end, was within the City.

== History ==
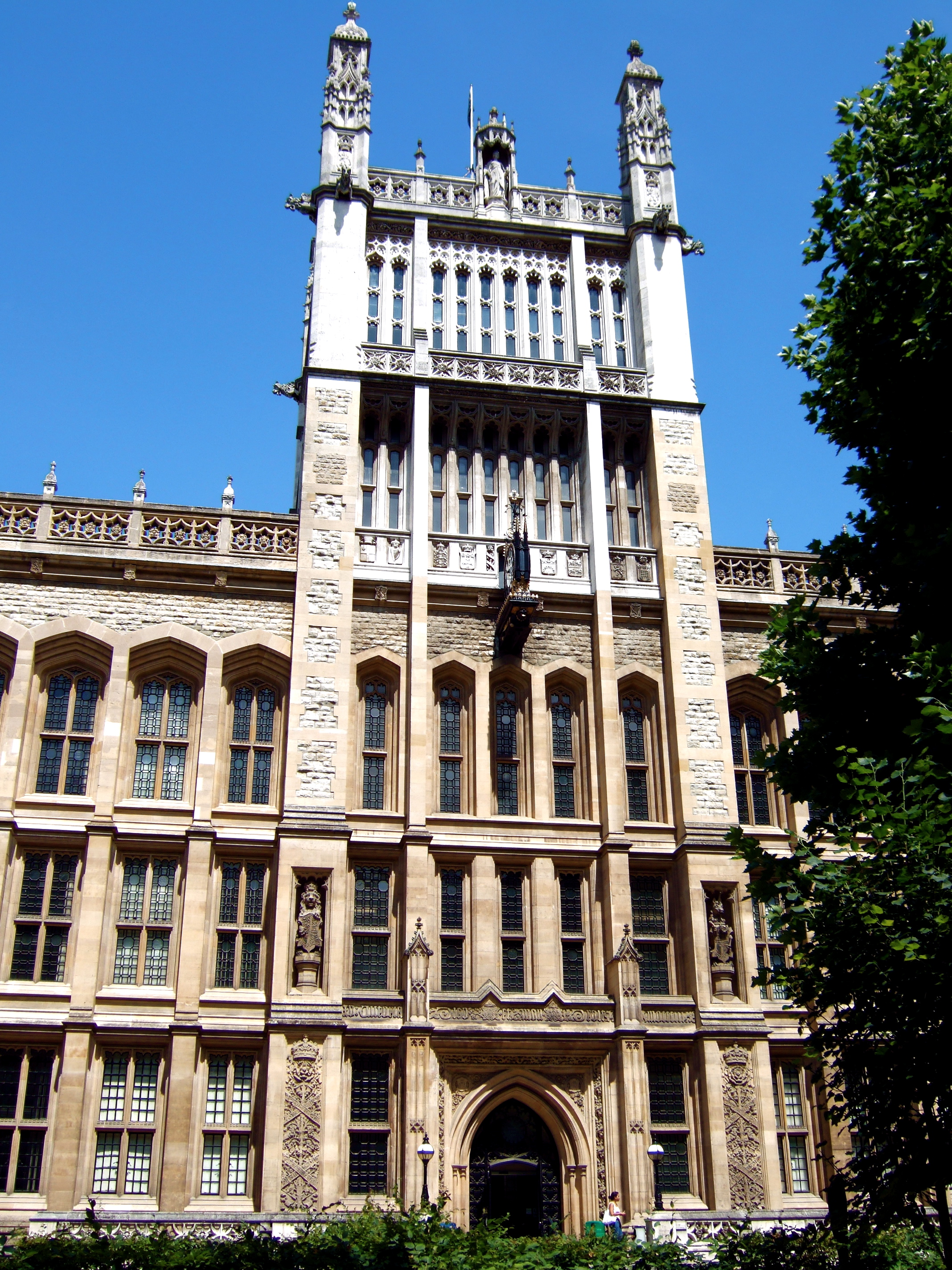
The Maughan Library and its clock tower is situated on the eastern side of Chancery Lane, opposite The Law Society.

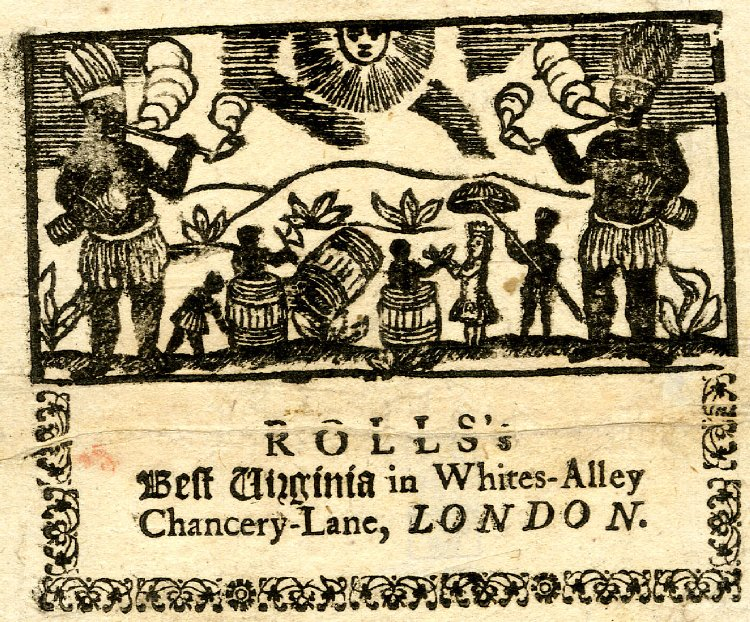
18th century advertisement for tobacco in Chancery Lane.

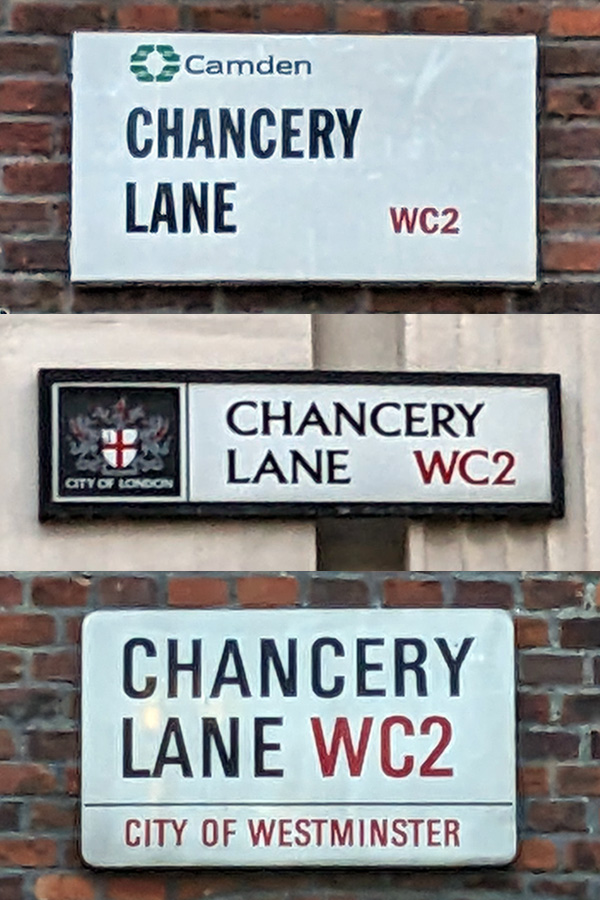
Chancery Lane is at the boundary of the City of London, the London Borough of Camden, and the City of Westminster, as visible in its different street signs

Chancery Lane takes its name from the historic High Court of Chancery, which started its association with the area when Robert de Chesney, the Bishop of Lincoln acquired the 'old Temple' in 1161. The road was originally known as New Street. It was renamed in 1377 to Chancellors Lane when King Edward II took over running of the Domus Conversorum (House of the Converts), a residence and chapel for Jews converted to Christianity, to use as the Keeper of the Rolls of Chancery.

In later centuries the Court convened in Lincoln's Inn Old Hall and other buildings there for the Court's purposes, such as the important Six Clerks office. On the eastern side of the street, below Bream's Buildings and opposite the Law Society, was the original site of the Domus Conversorum founded by King Henry III in the 13th century.

In the 14th century it became the estate of the Master of the Rolls, which included an official residence (Rolls House, based on the Domus Conversorum and storage for court records). The site later became the Public Record Office (which has since become the National Archives), the present Grade II* listed, Gothic Revival building designed by Sir James Pennethorne was built in 1851. In 1907 it became the museum of the Public Record Office and throughout the latter half of the 20th century records gradually moved to a new site located in Kew. In 2001 it underwent renovation and became the Maughan Library, the largest academic library of King's College London.

The Patent Office was originally situated off Southampton Buildings and some of the minor side streets also are named after their associations with now defunct legal practices, such as Rolls Buildings and Cursitor Alley. Just to the south of the Maughan Library is the site of the former Serjeant's Inn.

== Notable buildings ==
The principal building of The Law Society, the professional body for solicitors in England and Wales, is at No. 113. Ede and Ravenscroft, the oldest tailors in London, have their main (and historic) outlet and offices at No. 93, which is also their outlet for legal dress. The London Silver Vaults are located at the northern end of Chancery Lane.
