= Domesday (disambiguation) =

Domesday refers to the Domesday Book, a survey of the land conquered by the Normans in 1066.

Domesday may also refer to:

== Survey ==
- Exon Domesday, the Domesday of Exeter, England
- Winton Domesday, the Domesday of Winchester, England

== BBC works about the Domesday ==
- BBC Domesday Project, laserdisc publication
- BBC Domesday Reloaded, website

== See also ==
- Domesday Book (disambiguation)
- Doomsday (disambiguation)
- Doomsday Book (disambiguation)
