= Domesday Book (disambiguation) =

Domesday Book is a record of the great survey of England completed in 1086.

Domesday Book may also refer to:

- Domesday Book, the newsletter of the Castle & Crusade Society
- Exeter Domesday Book, land and tax register

== See also ==
- Doomsday (disambiguation)
- Doomsday Book (disambiguation)
- BBC Domesday Project
- Domesday (disambiguation)
