= Doomsday =

Doomsday may refer to:

- Eschatology, a time period described in the eschatological writings in Abrahamic religions and in doomsday scenarios of non-Abrahamic religions.
- Global catastrophic risk, a hypothetical event explored in science and fiction where human civilization or life is at risk of partial or complete destruction.

== Culture ==
=== Novels ===
- Doomsday (novel), a 1927 novel by Warwick Deeping
- Doomsday, a novel in the Endworld series by David L. Robbins

=== Film ===
- Doomsday (1928 film), a 1928 American romance drama silent film
- Doomsday (2008 film), a 2008 British film by Neil Marshall
- 2012: Doomsday, a 2008 American science fiction action film
- Avengers: Doomsday, a 2026 American superhero film

=== Television ===
- "Doomsday" (Beavis and Butt-Head), an episode of Beavis and Butt-Head
- "Doomsday" (Doctor Who), a 2006 episode of Doctor Who, or the title song
- "Doomsday" (FBI), a 2018 episode
- "Doomsday" (Hercules: The Legendary Journeys), an episode of Hercules: The Legendary Journeys
- "Doomsday" (The Office), a 2011 eighth-season episode of the American version of The Office
- "Doomsday" (Runaways), an episode of Runaways
- "Doomsday" (Smallville episode), an episode of Smallville
- "Doomsday", an episode of the Super Friends
- "Doomsday", a first-season 1964 episode of Voyage to the Bottom of the Sea

=== Music ===
- Doomsday (band), a heavy metal band from California

==== Albums ====
- Doomsday (Boo-Yaa T.R.I.B.E.album), 1994
- Doomsday (Skinny Puppy album), 2001
- Operation: Doomsday, 1999

==== Songs ====
- "Doomsday" (Architects song), 2017
- "Doomsday" (Atreyu song), 2007
- "Doomsday" (Lyrical Lemonade, Juice Wrld and Cordae song), 2023
- "Doomsday" (MF Doom song), 1999
- "Doomsday" (Nero song), 2011
- "Doomsday" (Vassy & Lodato song), 2018
- "Doomsday", a song by Impending Doom from Death Will Reign
- "Doomsday", a song by Kasabian from the album 48:13
- "Doomsday", a song by Lizzy McAlpine from the album Five Seconds Flat
- "Doomsday", a song by Mephiskapheles from God Bless Satan
- "Doomsday", a song by Overseer from the 2003 album Wreckage
- "Doomsday", a song by Six Feet Under from the album Commandment
- "Doomsday", a song by Stand Atlantic from the album F.E.A.R.
- "Doomsday", a song by War of Ages from the album Supreme Chaos
- "Doomsday Pt. 2" (Lyrical Lemonade and Eminem song), 2023

=== Other uses in culture ===
- Hearts of Iron II: Doomsday, a stand-alone expansion for Hearts of Iron II
- Doomsday Zone, a level from the game Sonic & Knuckles
- Doomsday (DC Comics), a fictional character in the DC Comics Universe
- Doomsday rule, a way of calculating the day of the week of a given date
- Doomsday cult, a cult that believes in apocalypticism and millenarianism

== Other uses ==
- Glenn Jacobs or Doomsday, Spanish-born professional wrestler
- Domesday Book (or the "Book of Winchester") is the "Great Survey" of England and Wales of 1086.
- BBC Domesday Project, a "survey" of children's daily life in the United Kingdom, made in 1986.
- BBC Domesday Reloaded, a web site for the digitised content of the BBC's 1986 Domesday Project.
- Doomsday Clock, a symbol that represents the likelihood of man-made global catastrophe.

== See also ==
- Apocalypse, another name for doomsday
- Domesday Book, the original 11th-century record of England
- Doomsday Book (disambiguation)
