= George Auckland =

British media executive

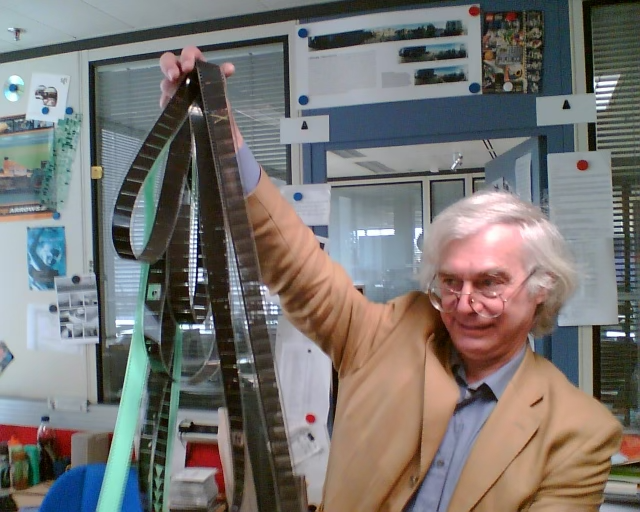
George Auckland looking through a reel of tape in the BBC Interactive Factual & Learning Innovations Hub, 22 May 2006.

George Auckland is a UK television and digital media executive known for his long and successful career at the BBC. During his time as a BBC executive he worked on key educational landmarks in British interactive media, including the BBC Micro computer and the BBC Networking Club. He also set up the BBC's first web production unit which was responsible for award-winning websites, such as Teletubbies and Bitesize, and produced many of the BBC's early TV programmes about home computing and the Internet.

Auckland graduated from Durham University (Hatfield College) with a degree in Applied Physics in 1969. Shortly after graduation he joined the BBC as a trainee in the Film Department. During the three-day week he had to get special permission to use electricity. He went on to develop a career as a TV producer, working on various programmes from Blue Peter to award-winning adult education shows including Johnny Ball's Think of a Number. In December 1989, he received a Royal Television Society award for Take Nobody's Word For It (Vermeer episode) with Hendrik Ball, the award being in the 'adult/continuing education general audience (1988)' category.

In spring 1996 Auckland helped create the BBC Education Website, and in 1999 he became head of a new department called Digital Media, which won the Royal Television Society, Educational Television, 1999 Judge's Award in (received in 2000) for BBC Education Online. Auckland was known at the BBC for his embrace of new technology; in 1996 he reportedly taught himself HTML in the span of 24 hours.

Auckland ran the Innovations Unit within BBC Learning (formerly BBC Interactive Factual and Learning) until 31 March 2011, when he retired from the BBC after 41 and a half years of service.

In 2007 he received the 2006 RTS Lifetime Achievement Award at the RTS Educational Awards.

In 2015 George was awarded the President of the NHK Prize for his "outstanding contributions to lifelong learning both through TV and Online".

== Domesday Reloaded ==
Auckland worked on Domesday Reloaded, which was focused on the preservation and conversion of the Domesday project, from 1 March 2011 to 31 March 2012. Auckland has previously given talks about this and the many copyright issues at the Computer Conservation Society.
