= Ely Inquiry =

The Ely Inquiry or Inquisitio Eliensis [IE] was a satellite of the 1086 Domesday survey. Its importance is that it gives a more detailed account of the local area than Domesday book itself, and its prologue offers an account of the terms of enquiry of the Domesday survey.

== Origins ==
According to David C. Douglas, the Ely Inquiry was the product of an ecclesiastical landlord using the Domesday survey to produce a record of his own estates – something supported by the way it records the lands of one tenant-in-chief across many different Domesday circuits.

== Prologue ==
The prologue to IE gives an account of the methods of the Domesday inquest, working by way of reports (under oath) of sheriffs, Barons "and of their Frenchmen and of the whole hundred, of the priest, the reeve, and six villeins of each vill". It records a series of questions to be asked with respect to each manor, adding that all the answers were to be given in triplicate – "hoc totum tripliciter" – so as to cover three distinct times: Edward the Confessor's day, the time of the Conquest (1066), and the present-day (1086).

While sometimes taken to fully reflect the actual Domesday process, the prologue is perhaps better seen as an abbreviated guide to the questions used, not as necessarily having a direct link to the official specifications.

== Survey ==
The survey provides more information than its main equivalent, Little Domesday. In particular it gives more details about the jurors behind it, as well as stressing the local roles of sokemen.

Its summaries emphasise taxable capacities; while its closing schedules have been interpreted as records of early stages of the inquest (which had been edited out in the main work).

== See also ==
- Cambridge Inquisition
- Liber Exoniensis
