= Adam of Damerham =

13th-century English Benedictine monk and historian

Adam of Damerham (sometimes Adam of Domerham; died after 1291), was a Benedictine monk of Glastonbury Abbey, who wrote a history of the abbey, and was active in the ecclesiastical politics of his time.

== Biography ==
Adam is thought to have been a native of Damerham, Hampshire, a village belonging to Glastonbury Abbey. He wrote a history of the abbey entitled Historia de Rebus gestis Glastoniensibus, which exists in a manuscript in the library of Trinity College, Cambridge, possibly the author's own copy. It has been published by Thomas Hearne in two volumes. The first volume, however, does not contain any part of the work of Adam. Adam's history forms a continuation of the treatise of William of Malmesbury, De Antiquitate Glastoniæ. It begins at 1126, when Henry of Blois, afterwards bishop of Winchester, became abbot, and ends with the death of Abbot John of Taunton in 1291.

A large part of the history is taken up with papal bulls, charters, and other documents. From some expressions used by Adam about the character of Abbot Michael (1235–1252) it may be supposed that he entered the convent in his time. He was, therefore, a member of the fraternity during part of that period of difficulty and discord which followed the annexation of the abbey to the see of Wells by Bishop Savaric, a proceeding which brought on Glastonbury heavy expense and loss of property, and which endangered its independence. He relates the history of these troubles at considerable length, and says in his preface that his object in writing his book was to incite his readers to protect or to increase the prosperity of his church, which once enjoyed privileges above all others, but was then bereft of her liberties and possessions.

On the deposition of Abbot Roger Forde by William Button, bishop of Bath, in 1255, Adam, with four other monks, was appointed by the convent to elect an abbot by ‘compromise,’ or on behalf of the whole fraternity. The choice of the electors fell on Robert of Petherton. Roger was, however, restored to his office by the pope. On his death Robert again became abbot.

Adam was cellarer to the monastery, and the entry with which he opens the list of good deeds done by Abbot William Vigor, stating that inprimis he added to the strength of the beer, possibly shows that the writer entered with some zest into the details of his office. He afterwards became sacristan. On one important occasion he seems to have shown considerable firmness of character. A sharp dispute had been carried on between the bishops of Bath and Abbot Robert about the lordship of the abbey. The bishops claimed to be the mesne lords, while the abbot declared that his house held immediately of the crown. When Robert died in 1274, the monks tried to keep his death secret, avowedly because it happened at Eastertide, but doubtless from the more cogent reason that they desired time to secure the recognition of their immediate dependence on the crown. The bishop's officers, however, found out how matters stood. They came to Glastonbury and caused all the servants of the abbey to swear fealty to their master, and put bailiffs in all the manors. The king's escheator appeared at the abbey gates and was refused admission by the bishop's men. Adam, however, was not daunted, and on behalf of the prior, who apparently was absent at the time, and of all the convent, appealed in set terms against this usurpation. The next day he had the satisfaction of seeing the constable of Bristol Castle arrive. The king's escheator was enabled to take seisin of the monastery, and the bishop's men were forced to retreat in haste.

Adam, who was an eyewitness of the proceedings, gives an interesting account of the visit of Edward I and his queen to Glastonbury in April 1278, when the tomb of King Arthur was opened, and his bones and the bones of Guinevere were borne by the English king and his queen to a new resting-place before the high altar. Adam appears to have followed the example of his abbot, John of Taunton, in doing his best to recover for the monastery some of the treasures which it had lost. His history is generally said to end at 1290, the date assigned by him to the death of John of Taunton, with which he concludes his work. This date seems, however, to be incorrect, for he records the burial of Eleanor, queen of Edward I, as taking place 27 December 1290. He says that after that event Abbot John was summoned by the king to the funeral of his mother, Eleanor of Provence, which was performed at Ambresbury on the festival of the Nativity of the B. V. Mary, 8 September 1291. Abbot John was sick at the time, but did not like to fail in obedience to the king's command. His death on the festival of St. Michael is the last event recorded by Adam of Damerham, who therefore brings down his story to 1291.
