= Doomsday Book (disambiguation) =

Doomsday Book may refer to:

- Domesday Book or Doomsday Book, an 11th-century survey of England
- Doomsday Book (novel), a 1992 novel by Connie Willis
- Doomsday Book (film), a 2012 science-fiction anthology film directed by Kim Jee-woon and Yim Pil-sung

== See also ==
- Domesday Book (disambiguation)
- Doomsday (disambiguation)
