= Cambridge Inquisition =

Satellite survey of the Domesday Book

The Cambridge Inquisition – Inquisitio Comitatus Cantabrigiensis or ICC – is one of the most important of the satellite surveys relating to the Domesday Book of 1086.

It not only offers fuller information than the latter, but has also played an important and ongoing role in the debates over the making of the Domesday Book/Survey.

== Layout ==
Though surviving only in a 12th-century copy, the ICC is accepted to represent evidence of an early stage in the inquest process underlying the Domesday Book. It reports the results presented by jurors from the hundreds and vills of the shire, geographically organised. The ICC contains details of more settlements than Domesday Book covers, gives ratings for both 1066 and 1086, and also provides jurors' names, English and French. It also records details of livestock - “shameful to record...not even one ox, nor one cow, nor one pig escaped notice in his survey”, complained the Anglo-Saxon Chronicle - omitted in the Book itself.

== Round/Galbraith/Roffe: the Domesday debate ==
J H Round at the close of the 19th century argued influentially that the geographical framework of the ICC was representative of the nationwide survey as a whole; and that it was only after all the returns were in, that they were arranged in feudal form to create Domesday Book itself. A half-century later, V. H. Galbraith used the Liber Exoniensis (the Exon Domesday) with its feudal returns as a central model of the survey, with the sworn evidence of the hundred jurors relegated to a subsidiary role.

The 21st century however has seen a renewed interest in the ICC, however, and a reappraisal of its perhaps normative role in the Domesday process.

== See also ==
- Ely Inquiry
