= Roger of Forde =

English translator

- Occupations: Cistercian monk and hagiographer

Roger of Forde (fl. 1170), also called Roger of Ford, Roger Gustun, Roger Gustum, and Roger of Cîteaux was a Cistercian monk and hagiographer.

== Biography ==
Forde was a Cistercian monk of Ford in Devonshire. He went to Schonau, and while there wrote, at the order of William, abbot of Savigny, ‘An Account of the Revelations of St. Elizabeth of Schonau,’ with a preface addressed to Baldwin, abbot of Ford, afterwards Archbishop of Canterbury. The preface begins ‘Qui vere diligit semper,’ and the text ‘Promptum in me est, frater.’ A manuscript of this work is in St. John's College, Oxford, cxlix, No. 8; another copy is in Bodleian MS. E. 2. Roger also wrote a sermon on the eleven thousand virgins of Cologne, beginning ‘Vobis qui pios affectus,’ and an encomium of the Virgin Mary in elegiacs, both of which are contained in the St. John's College MS. clxix. No. 8, and the latter in Bodleian MS. E. 2 as well.
