= Winton Domesday =

12th-century English administrative document

The Winton Domesday or Liber Winton is a 12th-century English administrative document recording the landholdings in the city of Winchester together with their tenants and the rents and services due from them. The city is not included in the surviving evidence of Domesday Book in 1086; whether the town was surveyed and the evidence no longer survives is unclear. The manuscript brings together the returns from two different "satellite" surveys. The first was carried out for King Henry I in c. 1110 (1103 x 1115) and covered the royal holdings in Winchester, describing conditions before and after the Conquest. This part draws on an earlier survey, now lost, made in c. 1057, during the reign of Edward the Confessor. The second survey, which covered the entire town, was conducted for Henry of Blois, bishop of Winchester, in 1148.

== Editions ==
- Barlow, F. (ed.), "The Winton Domesday" in Winchester in the Early Middle Ages: an Edition and Discussion of the Winton Domesday, ed. M. Biddle (Winchester Studies no. 1. Oxford, 1976) pp. 1–142
- Ellis, Henry (ed.), "Liber Winton" in Liber censualis vocati Domesday Book 4, ed. H. Ellis (Record Commission, 1816) pp. 529–62
