= Liber Exoniensis =

Manuscript originating with the Domesday Survey of 1086

- Exon Domesday, Exeter Domesday
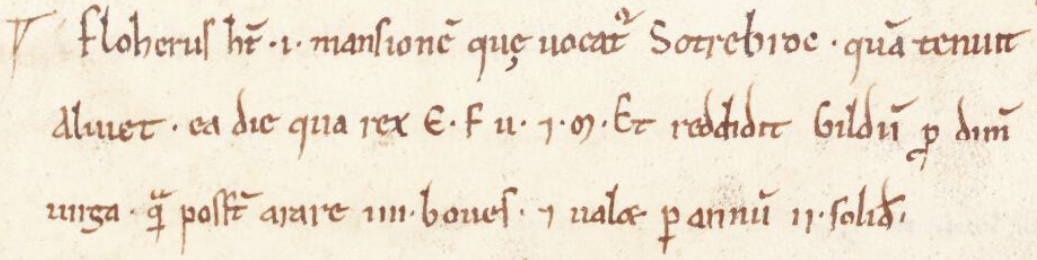
- "Sotrebroc *(extract)
- Compiled by: Normans
- Manuscript(s): Exeter Cathedral Library, MS 3500, arranged and rebound in 1816
- Length: 552 folios, single column

The Liber Exoniensis or Exon Domesday is the oldest of the three manuscripts originating with the Domesday Survey of 1086, covering south-west England. It contains a variety of administrative materials concerning the counties of Cornwall, Devon, Dorset, Somerset and Wiltshire. It is MS 3500 in Exeter Cathedral Library.

== Contents ==
The leaves were first numbered about 1500, when they were bound as two volumes. They were rearranged and rebound in 1816, when the Record Commission edition was published. There was no "original order" of the quires, which were in effect separate working documents. Five principal types of record can be distinguished:

1. The greater part consists of descriptions of manors, obtained from the returns of the Domesday survey, sometimes called the Domesday Inquest, covering Somerset, Cornwall, Devon (incomplete), Dorset (incomplete) and one entry for Wiltshire. Most entries have counterparts in Great Domesday Book, which rearranges, abbreviates, and rewords them. Exon is arranged by landholder; Great Domesday rearranged by county.
2. Summary accounts of geld, a tax assessed on land. There are three versions for Wiltshire and one for each of Cornwall, Devon, Dorset and Somerset. For every hundred, the total number of hides is given, followed by the number that were exempt because they were held in demesne by the king or his barons, the number that had paid (along with the sum of money received), and the number which had not paid or for which the geld had been withheld. Elsewhere, Exon text refers to an "Inquest of Geld" which was evidently concerned with collecting arrears and validating claims to exemption. It was undertaken at the same time and by the same royal commissioners as an Inquest of Lands which was part of the Domesday survey.
3. Terrae Occupatae, lists of lands in Devon, Cornwall, and Somerset that were held without full royal authority.
4. Two lists of hundreds in each of Devon, Cornwall, and Somerset.
5. A handful of summaries of fiefs held by individual barons. There is also a schedule of some of the quires in the collection which has sometimes been mistaken for an index.

folios	summary	comment
1–3v	Wiltshire geld accounts, version A	the latest version
7–9v	Wiltshire geld accounts, version B	
11–12v	Dorset boroughs	
13–16v	Wiltshire geld accounts, version C	
17–24	Dorset geld accounts	
25–62v	Dorset and Wiltshire manorial descriptions	
63–64v	Two lists of the hundreds in Devon, Cornwall, and Somerset	
65–71	Devon geld accounts	
72–73	Cornwall geld accounts	
75–82v	Somerset geld accounts (main part)	
83–494v	Devon, Cornwall and Somerset manorial descriptions	
495–506v	Terrae Occupatae in Devon	
507–508v	Terrae Occupatae in Cornwall	
508v–525	Terrae Occupatae in Somerset	
526–527v	Somerset geld accounts (small part only)	
527v–531	Fief summaries	
532–532v	Partial schedule of quires	

== See also ==
- Cambridge Inquisition
- Ely Inquiry
