= BBC Domesday Project =

Crowdsourced born-digital description of the UK, published in 1986

1986 Domesday Book running on its original hardware

The BBC Domesday Project was a partnership between Acorn Computers, Philips, Logica, and the BBC (with some funding from the European Commission's ESPRIT programme) to mark the 900th anniversary of the original Domesday Book, an 11th-century census of England. It has been cited as an example of digital obsolescence on account of the physical medium used for data storage.

This new multimedia edition of Domesday was compiled between 1984 and 1986 and published in 1986. It included a new "survey" of the United Kingdom, in which people, mostly school children, wrote about geography, history or social issues in their local area or just about their daily lives. This was linked with maps, and many colour photos, statistical data, video and "virtual walks". The project also incorporated professionally prepared video footage, virtual reality tours of major landmarks and other prepared datasets such as the 1981 census. Over a million people participated in the project, including children from more than 9,000 schools.

== Purpose ==
Initially estimated to require the involvement of 10,000 schools and about one million children, the intention was to make the role of schools central in a data gathering project that would assign each school to a geographical area, have parents and local societies collect data, with the schools "acting as a focus and providing the computer". Questionnaires about geography, amenities and land use were to be completed, with school pupils and other contributors also able to write about their local area and "the issues affecting them" in their own words.

In the context of the educational relevance of microcomputers and of information retrieval software operating on repositories of data that might potentially be built by children, it was felt that:

It is in the handling of data that children can best develop an understanding of what counts for knowledge. They can be led into the areas of critical interpretation. As the computer takes over the role of storing and sorting the data, children can increasingly involve themselves in analysing the significance of the data.

— Bill O'Neill, University of Ulster, quoted by John Lamb in New Scientist, 28 March 1985

With regard to potential applications of the system and of its significance, one contemporary reviewer of the system reflected:

The concept behind Domesday is very far reaching, since for the first time large quantities of images and data can be held together. For publishers and knowledge workers, the media for communication will never be quite the same. And this really is just the start.

— Pip Forer

== Format ==
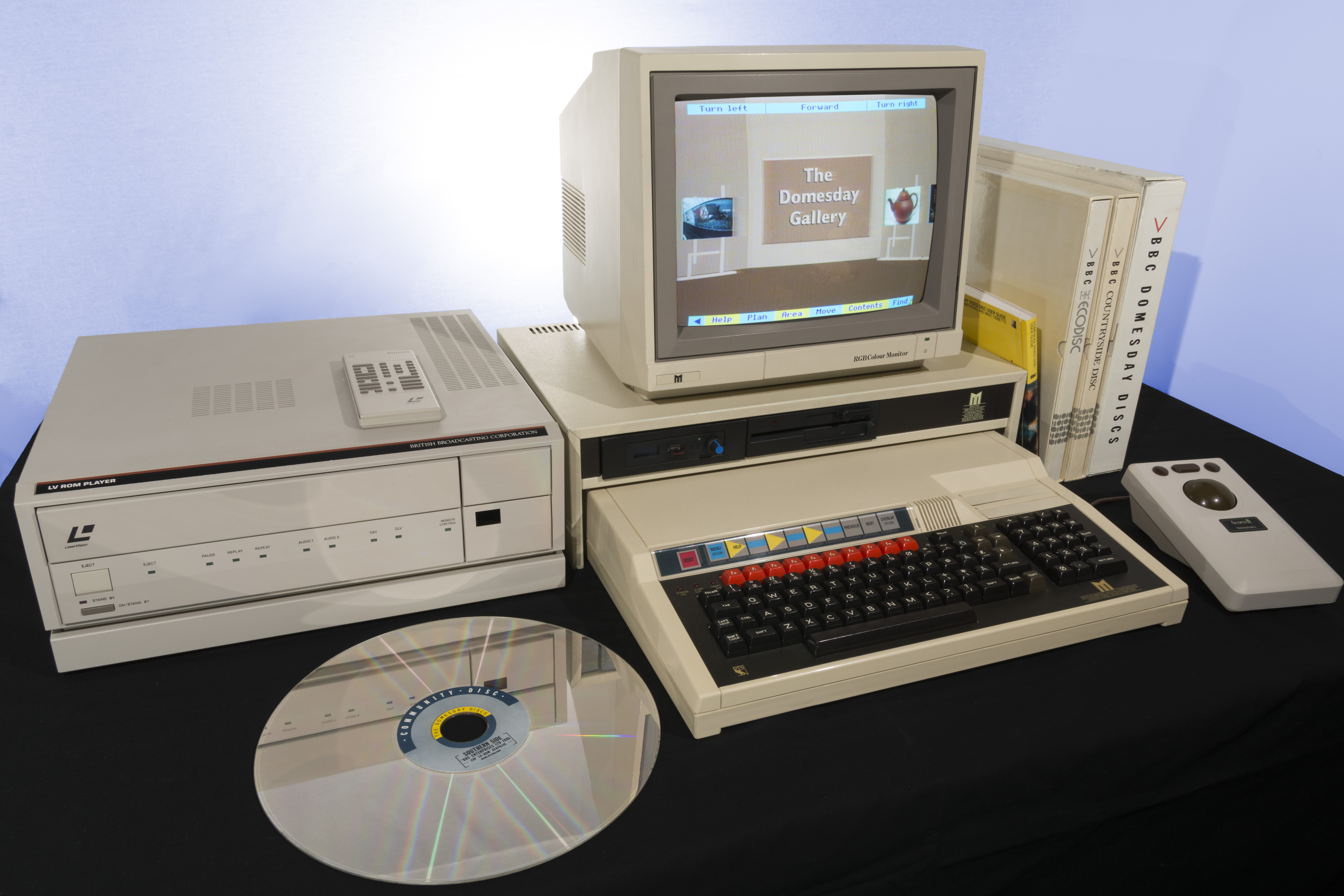
The Domesday System

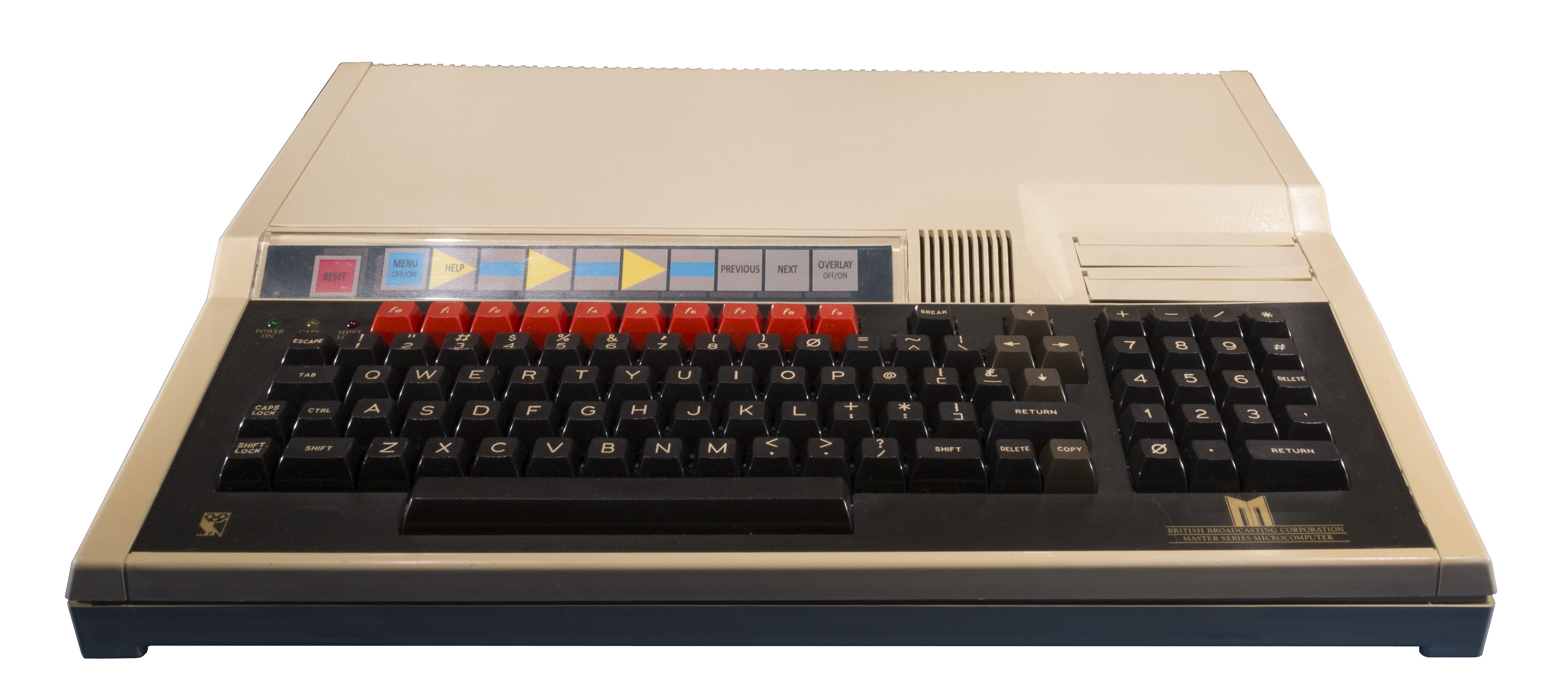
BBC Master AIV

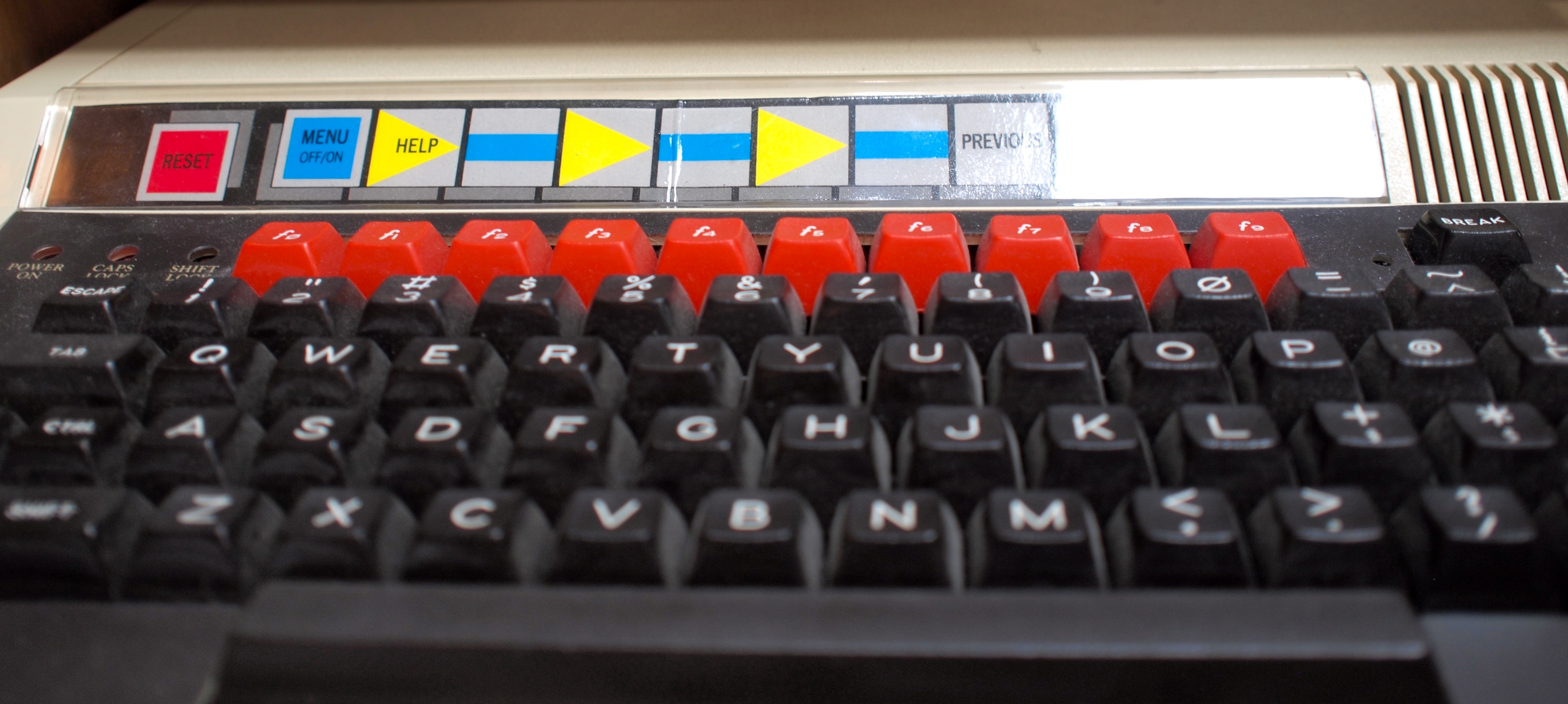
Function key strip for navigation

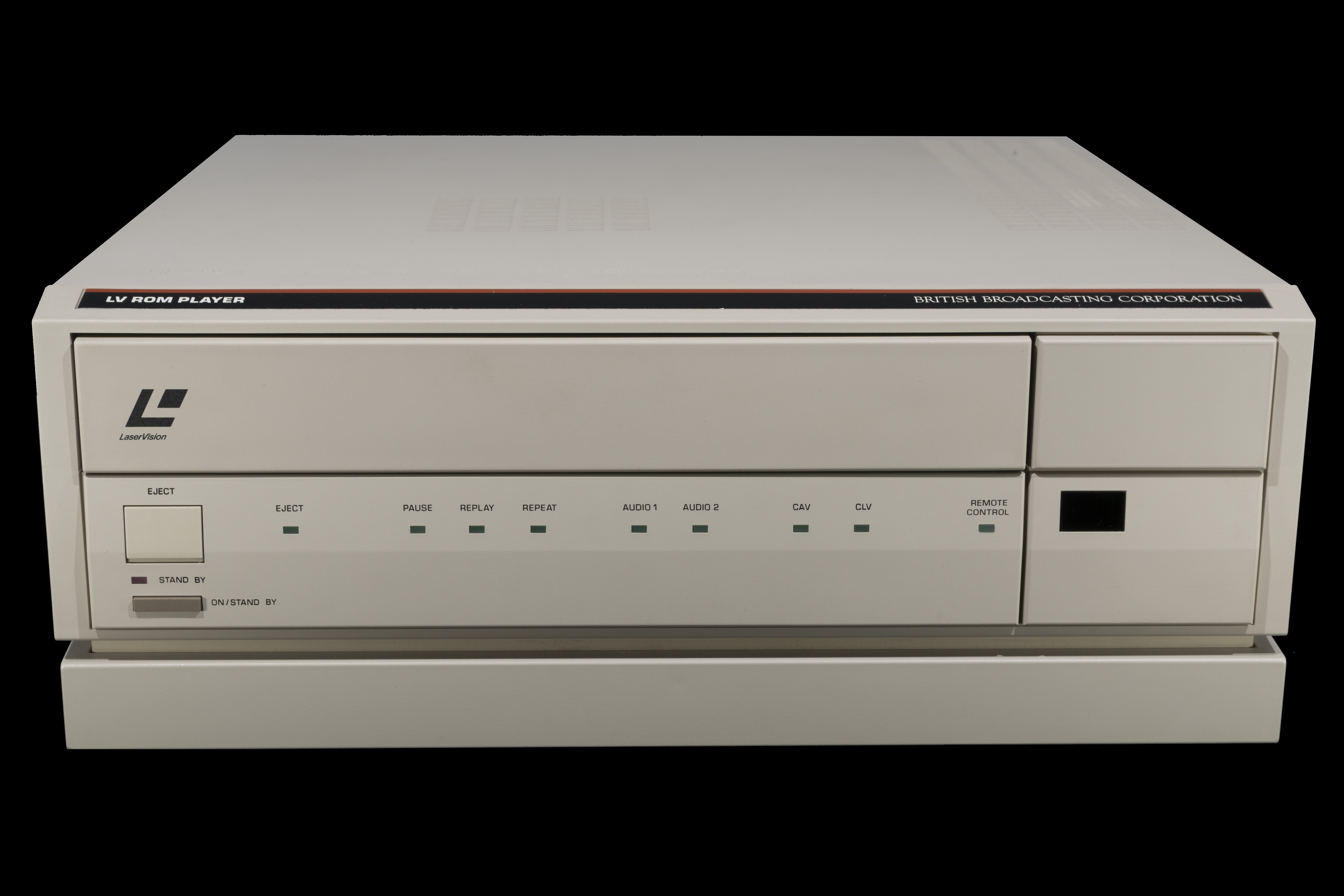
Philips VP415 LV-ROM player

The project was stored on adapted LaserDiscs in the LaserVision Read Only Memory (LV-ROM) format, which contained not only analogue video and still pictures, but also digital data, with 300 MB of storage space on each side of the disc. Initial estimates indicated a total storage capacity of 2 GB per disc, described as sufficient for 80,000 pictures (including satellite images) and "half a million text pages" plus software to process maps and graphical information. The delivered product was estimated to offer a "total potential capacity" of around 1400 MB with half of that capacity filled.

Data and images were selected and collated by the BBC Domesday project based in Bilton House in West Ealing. Pre-mastering of data was carried out on a VAX-11/750 mini-computer, assisted by a network of BBC Micro microcomputers. The discs were mastered, produced, and tested by the Philips Laservision factory in Blackburn, England.

Viewing the discs required the BBC Master AIV, a Acorn BBC Master computer expanded with a SCSI controller and the 65C102 "Turbo" co-processor - which controlled a Philips VP415 LaserVision laserdisc player. The user interface consisted of the BBC Master's keyboard and a trackball (more specifically the Marconi RB2 Trackerball rebranded by Acorn). The enhancements provided by the Philips VP415 permitted computer control and access to data stored on the discs.

The project was split over two laserdiscs:

- The Community Disc contained personal reflections on life in Britain and is navigated on a geographic map of Britain. The entire country was divided into blocks that were 4 km (2.5 mi) wide by 3 km (1.9 mi) long, based on Ordnance Survey grid references. Each block could contain up to 3 photographs and a number of short reflections on life in that area. Most, but not all, of the blocks are covered in this way. In addition more detailed maps of key urban areas and blocks of 40 km × 30 km (25 mi × 19 mi) and regional views were captured, allowing "zoom-out" and "zoom-in" functions. The community disc was double sided, with a "Southern" and a "Northern" side, although country-wide data at the 40×30 km level and above was on both sides.
- The National Disc contained more varied material, including data from the 1981 census, sets of professional photographs and virtual reality-like walkarounds shot for the project. Side 2 of the National disc contained video material. The material was stored in a hierarchy and some of it could be browsed by walking around a virtual art gallery, clicking on the pictures on the wall, or walking through doors in the gallery to enter the VR walkarounds. In addition a natural language search was provided, supported through the application of the Porter stemming algorithm.

== Supported platforms ==
The application software for the project was written in BCPL (a precursor to C) for portability between different hardware and software platforms, although the software required additional patches to run on the RM Nimbus version of the system. An Amiga version of the system was considered but not initiated.

== Concerns over electronic preservation ==
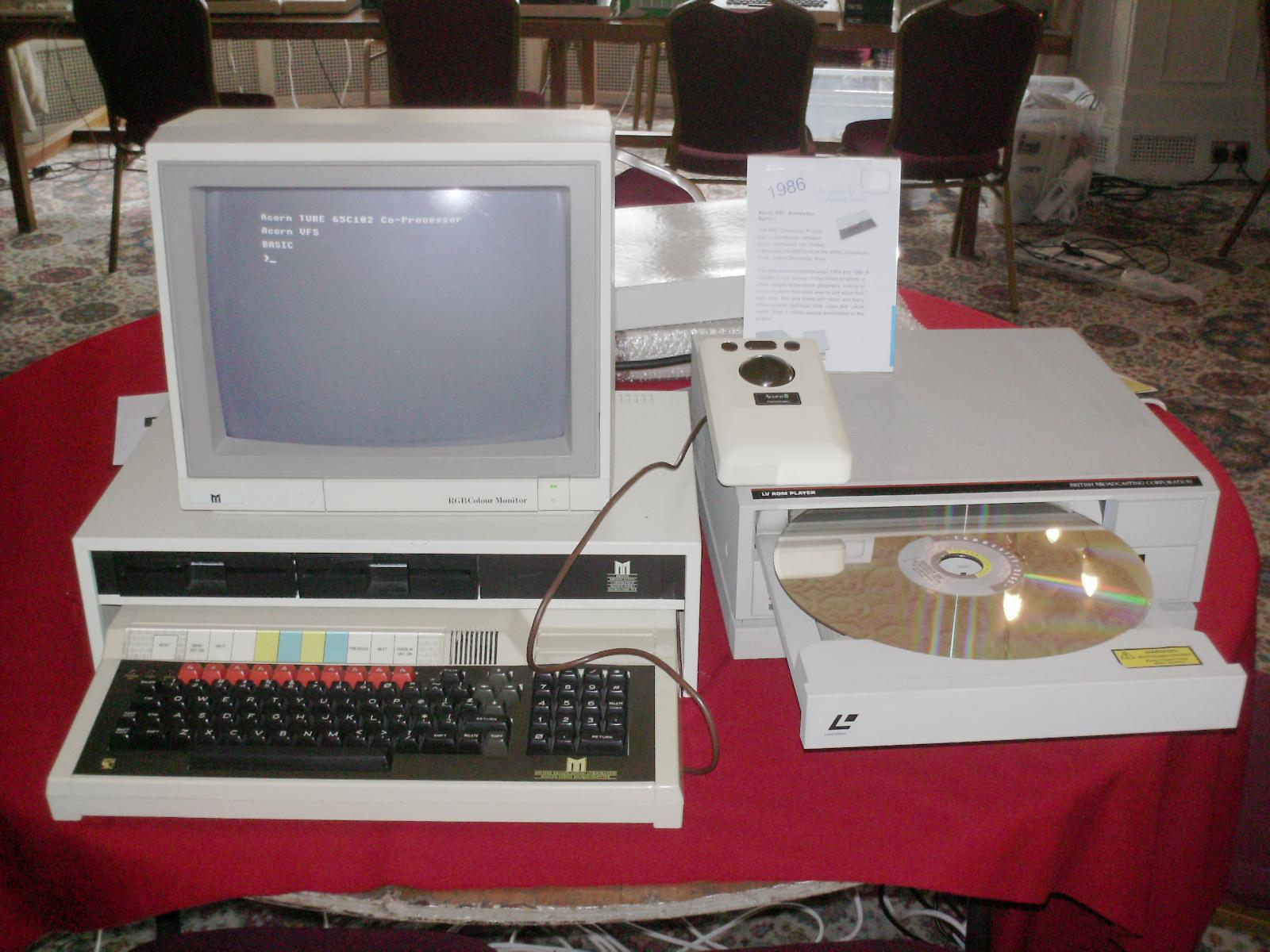
A Domesday system at the VCF-GB 2010

In 2002, concerns emerged over the potential unreadablility of the discs as computers capable of reading the format became rare and drives capable of accessing the discs even rarer. Aside from the difficulty of emulating the original code, a major issue was that the still images had been stored on the laserdisc as single-frame analogue video, which were overlaid by the computer system's graphical interface. The project had begun years before JPEG image compression and before truecolour computer video cards had become widely available.

In November 2023, a podcast episode by Tim Harford, "Laser Versus Parchment: Doomsday for the Disc," from the series Cautionary Tales, described and contextualized many of the troubled issues surrounding the historical trajectory of the BBC Domesday Project's data.

=== CAMiLEON (2002) ===
However, the BBC later announced that the CAMiLEON project (a partnership between the University of Leeds and University of Michigan, led by Margaret Hedstrom and managed by researcher Paul Wheatley) had developed a system capable of accessing the discs using emulation techniques. The CAMiLEON project transferred the text and database files stored on the Domesday laserdiscs to a Linux-based computer using a SCSI connection to the player. Images, stored as still-frame video, were digitised at full resolution using video capture hardware and stored uncompressed, ultimately requiring around 70 GB of storage per side of each laserdisc. A modified version of the Free Software emulator, BeebEm, was then used to access the archived data, with enhancements introduced to support emulation of the Turbo co-processor, SCSI communication and laserdisc player functionality.

=== Videotape Digitisation Efforts (2003) ===
Another team, working for the UK National Archives (who hold the original Domesday Book) tracked down the original 1-inch videotape masters of the project. These were digitised and archived to Digital Betacam.

=== Domesday 1986 (2004-2008) ===
A version of one of the discs was created that runs on a Windows PC. This version was reverse-engineered from an original Domesday Community disc and incorporates images from the videotape masters. It was initially available only via a terminal at the National Archives headquarters in Kew, but was published on the web as Domesday 1986 (at domesday1986.com) in July 2004. This version was taken off-line early in 2008 when its programmer, Adrian Pearce, suddenly died.

=== Domesday Reloaded (2011-2018) ===
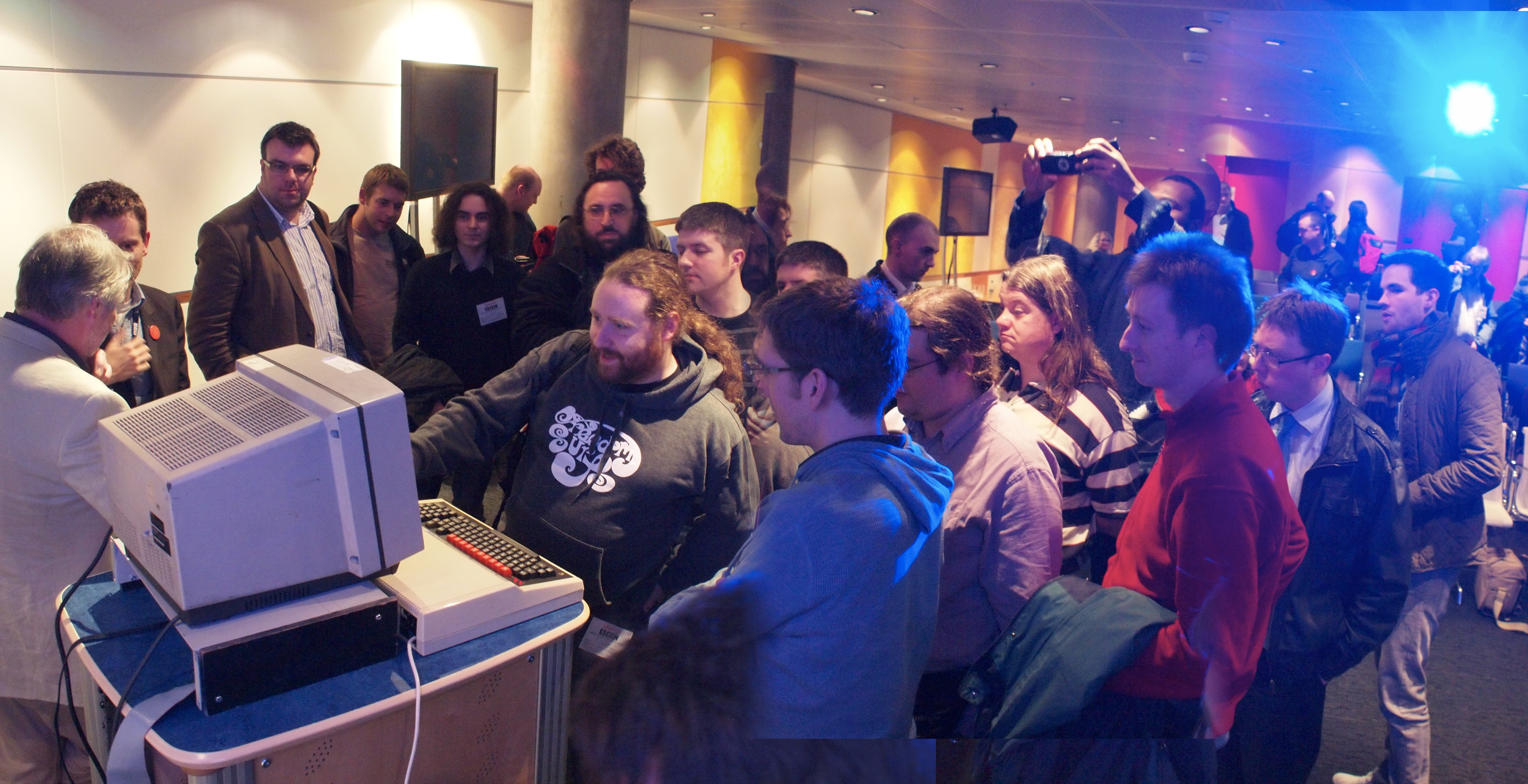
The Domesday machine in 2011

In 2011, a team at BBC Learning, headed by George Auckland, republished much of the Community disc data in a short-lived web-based format. This data comprising around 25,000 images was loaded onto the BBC Domesday Reloaded website which went online in May 2011 and offline in June 2018, being hosted in archived form at the National Archives thereafter. The data extraction underlying the Domesday Reloaded site was carried out in 2003 and 2004 by Simon Guerrero and Eric Freeman.

=== Domesday86 (2020) ===
Subsequent efforts by the Domesday86 project have taken a broader approach to preservation by attempting to preserve the technologies used to access Domesday and other interactive video content, along with the content itself, focusing on the laserdiscs as preservation artefacts in their own right. The stated objective of the group is to create hardware and software to permit the use of the BBC Domesday system without the need for the rare and expensive specialist hardware employed by the original system, also providing support for the original hardware, releasing developments under free software and open hardware licences.

=== Museum preservation initiatives (2020) ===
The Centre for Computing History in Cambridge has undertaken a similar project to preserve the data from the Domesday Project and made it available online. In 2011, with the National Disc and Community Disc processed, the museum was investigating copyright issues before releasing the URL to the general public. An emulator has since been made available in collaboration with the Domesday86 project. The museum has a working Domesday system on display and accessible to the public. They also have possibly the largest Domesday and interactive laserdisc archive in the world.

The National Museum of Computing based beside Bletchley Park in Milton Keynes has a working Domesday system in its BBC Micro Classroom for visitors to use.

== Archival of material ==
The deputy editor of the Domesday Project, Mike Tibbets, has criticised the UK's National Data Archive to which the archive material was originally entrusted, arguing that the creators knew that the technology would be short-lived but that the archivists had failed to preserve the material effectively.

== Language and regional issues ==
An initial decision to only support the entry of text in English for the Domesday discs led to a dispute involving Welsh schools in areas where local education authorities supported both English and Welsh as first languages:

There's no way you can ask children whose first language is Welsh to write about their local area in a foreign language.

— Charles Davies, Domesday co-ordinator for Clwyd

A compromise saw the BBC allowing ten pages of Welsh text that were to be accompanied by ten pages of English translation for each school submitting content in the Welsh language. With such schools effectively seeing their allocation being reduced from twenty pages to ten, some Welsh schools were apparently boycotting the project in protest at this apparent discrimination. Other concerns from Welsh schools were raised in relation to featured amenities to be surveyed by each school, these being less commonplace in rural areas, suggesting a bias towards urban areas in the design of the survey criteria.

Although as many as 13,000 schools showed an interest in collecting and submitting data, these schools mainly covered urban areas, leaving "large gaps of knowledge" in rural areas, and leading the Domesday Project team to reach out to the Women's Institute, Scout Association, Guide Association and to farmers.

== Copyright issues ==
In addition to preserving the project, untangling the copyright issues also presents a significant challenge. In addition to copyright surrounding the many contributions made by the estimated 1 million people who took part in the project, there are also copyright issues that relate to the technologies employed. It is likely that the Domesday Project will not be completely free of copyright restrictions until at least 2090 (assuming no further extensions of copyright terms).

== Interactive video ==
The BBC Master-based system used to deliver the Domesday Project content, known as the Domesday Advanced Interactive Video (AIV) System, was also intended as a platform to support other interactive video applications, integrating with programming languages such as BASIC and Logo via the operating system. Opportunities were perceived for the introduction of the technology beyond the education sector and into various areas of the public and private sectors, estimating "300,000 potential business customers". Acorn set up a subsidiary, Acorn Video, offering the platform under the name Master Video with a choice of Philips or Pioneer laserdisc player for £3220, or £3750 for a more compact version. (This ostensibly followed on from earlier products: the Acorn Interactive System, based on the BBC Micro and Pioneer or Philips laserdisc player, which only supported unidirectional control of a laserdisc player via a serial link, and the Viewpoint Interactive Video Workstation.)

BBC Enterprises and Virgin released interactive video discs for education. Following on from the initial Domesday content, the Ecodisc from BBC Enterprises provided an ecological simulation of Slapton Ley nature reserve designed to complement biology and ecology field trips at secondary school level. It was priced at £169 plus VAT, with one side of the disc containing the interactive content and data, the other side containing the BBC Schools Television programme Ecology and Conservation.

Virgin's North Polar Expedition title, in contrast to Ecodisc, provided the software to support interaction on separate floppy disks instead of as LV-ROM content. It was priced at £199 plus VAT, and was reportedly a "testbed for CDI applications" planned by Virgin Publishing. Having received one unfavourable verdict that the title offered "a tired question and answer format in what should be an innovative new medium", a response to this particular review attempted to address such criticisms by noting the limitations of the interaction method employed by the Domesday system, the tightly coupled sound and video capabilities of the medium, and the need to deliver and improve the software without involving the "expensive and complex LV-ROM mastering process". The response also questioned the future of the LV-ROM format, in contrast to Laservision and CD-ROM, also indicating that CD-I would remove various restrictions experienced with the laserdisc medium.

The BBC's Countryside disc provided various census and agricultural datasets and was sponsored by a broad consortium of public and private sector organisations. The BBC's Volcanoes disc, produced in association with Oxford University Press, featured volcanic eruption footage and animated computer graphics sequences by award-winning animator, Rod Lord, together with hypertext features. The Volcanoes disc (priced at £194.35) employed "new AIV features like hypertext" and had graphical content that was created on Archimedes computers. Shell Education Services offered an "interactive video project pack" intended for educational use in various subjects based on "a system developed by Shell UK to provide route maps in filling stations". Epic Industrial Communications offered a "complete course in solid state electronics" for the AIV system, priced at £2300 plus VAT.

Support software was also made for the AIV platform such as the Domesday Display application suite which allowed users to extract data and pictures from the laserdiscs and to present them in the form of a slideshow. The Domesday Presenter application focused on Domesday and AIV system laserdiscs, whereas the Domesday Captions application allowed video frames to be selected from AIV system laserdiscs or any other CAV (constant angular velocity) laserdisc, with the user adding their own captions.

Although this particular interactive video implementation had progressed away from previous "cumbersome and boring" solutions relying on the navigation of sequential-access video tape, tape-based solutions persisted as competitors. For example, the tape-based VP170 Video Presenter package from Interactive Media Resources (whose system processor was packaged similarly to an Acorn second processor) and the Companion system from Bevan Technology which could control VHS-based tape and Philips LaserVision players, both apparently offered support for integration with applications using the Microtext language. Ivan Berg Software (a one-time partner with Acornsoft on various titles) offered the Take Five system on Betamax format video tape with the BBC Micro supplying "question-and-answer frames" in interactive training course material. The Polymedia PCL 1000 also offered a combination of BBC Micro and Sony Betamax video tape recorder bundled with interface, single disc drive, colour monitor and software for £2,450. Earlier competitors included the Felix Link interface from Felix Learning Systems, supporting laserdisc, VHD video discs, U-Matic tapes, with VHS tapes promised, along with Cameron Communications' Interact B system offering touchscreen control over a Thorn EMI VHD video disc player.

Acorn's success in the interactive video market was reportedly hindered by Acorn's financial difficulties of 1985 putting the company's "support or commitment" into question, even leading to the BBC taking over the development of the Domesday Project's retrieval software from Acorn. Consequently, a contract for 1500 machines with Lloyd's Bank ended up being signed by Video Logic, and other potential customers had not progressed beyond trial purchases of Acorn's machines. By early 1988, "fewer than 2,000" Domesday systems had been sold, with the total price of the system being around £5,200. However, a voucher scheme had been in operation, reducing the purchase price to £3000, and this was to be extended until the end of that year.

Subsequent Acorn machines were also featured in laserdisc solutions. For instance, a system was offered by Eltec Computers and the British Nuclear Forum consisting of a BBC A3000, LaserVision 406 player, genlock card, and three discs designed by educators at Newcastle University aimed at secondary schools. The system cost £1899. Some software on the RISC OS platform also supported use of laserdisc players such as the Key Plus data collection and analysis software for the educational market. Oak Solutions' Genesis product supported use of laserdisc hardware, with The Battle of the Somme title, produced by Netherhall School in conjunction with NCET and the Imperial War Museum, incorporating "Laservision material which really brings the project alive" and offering "potentially a new beginning for that old Domesday system".
