= BBC Domesday Reloaded =

Local history web site for the digitised content of the BBC's 1986 Domesday Project

- Screenshot showing a written account from D-block GB-540000-252000
- Available in: English
- Owner: BBC
- Website: webarchive.nationalarchives.gov.uk/20110911075344/http://www.bbc.co.uk/history/domesday
- Commercial: Yes
- Registration: None
- Launched: 12 May 2011; 15 years ago
- Current status: Archived, non-functioning (July 2018)

BBC Domesday Reloaded was a local history web site for the digitised content of the BBC's 1986 Domesday Project. It was launched in May 2011 and included some updates contributed by users during 2011. During the site's first day of public operation, over two million pages were viewed.

== History ==
The BBC said that it worked with The National Archives to transfer the material. The data was extracted to a PC compatible computer by communication with a BBC Master computer which could read the disks from the original system. The transfer was facilitated by Simon Guerrero and Andy Finney, who were involved in the original project (Andy as an engineer and Simon as a teenage contributor).

In December 2011, the BBC announced installations of large horizontally installed (table-style) touchscreen interfaces to the data, known as "TouchTable". They are housed at its MediaCityUK site in Salford and The National Museum of Computing in Bletchley. The TouchTables used have a diagonal display size of 52 inches, which exceeded the largest LCD-based Surface 2.0 screen available at the time. The TouchTables were reported to have been developed by eMoot and allow up to four users to browse through the information at the same time, using 12 touch points simultaneously.

The website was transferred to The National Archives in June 2018.

== Main features ==
The website provided online access to images and articles from the original Domesday Project. Visitors were able to update information from their local area until the end of October 2011. Some local libraries hosted events for residents to contribute updates to the site.
