= List of historical societies =

This is a partial list of historical and heritage societies from around the world. The sections provided are not mutually exclusive. Many historical societies websites are their museums' websites. List is organized by location and later by specialization.

== International societies ==
=== Global ===
- Comité International d'Histoire de l'Art
- Haitian American Historical Society
- Historians without Borders
- History News Network
- International Association for Media and History
- International Committee of Historical Sciences
- International Commission for the History of Towns
- International Council on Archives
- International Historical Club, IHC
- International Economic History Association
- International Social History Association
- International Association for the History of Religions
- International Intelligence History Association
- International Water History Association
- International Students of History Association
- International Big History Association
- Medieval Chronicle Society
- Network of Concerned Historians
- The Theosophical Society

=== Supra-national ===
- Archives and Records Association (covers United Kingdom and Republic of Ireland)
- Asian Association of World Historians
- European Association of History Educators (EUROCLIO)
- Global Alliance for Preserving the History of WWII in Asia
- House of European History
- International Association of Historians of Asia
- Platform of European Memory and Conscience
- Western History Association
- World History Association

== Argentina ==
- National Academy of History of Argentina

== Australia ==
=== National societies ===
- The Australian Historical Association
- Federation of Australian Historical Societies
- Australian Jewish Historical Society
- Australian Association for Maritime History
- Australian Catholic Historical Society
- Australian Railway Historical Society
- Naval Historical Society of Australia
- Australian Garden History Society
- Military Historical Society of Australia

=== State and territory societies ===
==== New South Wales ====
- Royal Australian Historical Society
- Brewarrina Historical Society, Brewarrina
- St George Historical Society, St George (Sydney)

==== Northern Territory ====
- Historical Society of the Northern Territory

==== Queensland ====
- Royal Historical Society of Queensland

==== South Australia ====
- Kangaroo Island Pioneers Association
- Royal Geographical Society of South Australia
- South Australia Police Historical Society

==== Tasmania ====
- Tasmanian Historical Research Association

==== Victoria ====
- Royal Historical Society of Victoria
- Eltham District Historical Society
- Geelong Historical Society
- Heidelberg Historical Society

==== Western Australia ====
The Royal Western Australian Historical Society is the overarching society for the whole state.

Perth:

- Heritage Perth
- Bassendean Historical Society
- Bayswater Historical Society
- Canning Districts Historical Society
- City of South Perth Historical Society
- Cockburn Historical Society
- Colonial Bottle Collectors Club
- Darlington Historical Group
- Fremantle History Society
- Jewish Historical and Genealogical Society of WA
- Kalamunda and Districts Historical Society
- Maritime Archaeological Association WA
- Maylands Historical and Peninsula Association
- Melville Historical Society
- Midland and Districts Historical Society
- Mundaring and Hills Historical Society
- Perth Electric Tramway Society
- Rockingham District Society
- Scout Heritage Centre of WA
- Swan-Guildford Historical Society
- WA Police Historical Society
- Wanneroo and Districts Historical Society

Peel:

- Jarrahdale Heritage Society
- Kwinana Heritage Group
- Mandurah Historical Society
- Murray Districts Historical Society
- Serpentine Historical Society

Wheatbelt:

- Beverley Historical Society
- Bindoon and Districts Historical Society
- Brookton and Districts Historical Society
- Carnamah Historical Society
- Cervantes Historical Society
- Corrigin Historical Society
- Cunderdin Historical Society
- Goomalling Historical Society
- Koorda and Districts Museum & Historical Society
- Moora Historical Society
- Narembeen Historical Society
- Northam and Districts Historical Society
- Nungarin Heritage Machinery and Army Museum
- Toodyay Historical Society
- Wongan Hills and Districts Museum and Historical Society
- Yilgarn Historical Society
- The York Society

South West:

- Augusta Historical Society
- Australind and Districts Historical Society
- Bridgetown Historical Society
- Bunbury Historical Society
- Busselton Historical Society
- Denmark Historical Society
- Donnybrook Historical Society
- Friends of Donnelly Village
- Harvey Historical Society
- Manjimup Historical Society
- Margaret River and District Historical Society
- Walpole-Nornalup Historical Society

Great Southern:

- Albany Historical Society
- Broomehill Historical Society
- Katanning Historical Society
- Kojonup Historical Society
- Plantagenet Historical Society

Mid West:

- Birdwood Military Museum and Society
- Geraldton Historical Society
- Irwin Districts Historical Society
- Morowa District Historical Society
- Northampton Historical Society

Kimberley:

- Broome Historical Society
- Kununurra Historical Society
- Wyndham Historical Society

Goldfields-Esperance:

- Eastern Goldfields Historical Society
- Esperance Bay Historical Society
- Ravensthorpe Historical Society

Gascoyne:

- Gascoyne Historical Society

Pilbara:

- Pilbara Railways Historical Society

== Austria ==
- Gesellschaft für Salzburger Landeskunde
- Historischer Verein für Steiermark
- Österreichischer Arbeitskreis für Stadtgeschichtsforschung
- Tiroler Geschichtsverein
- Verein für Geschichte der Stadt Wien
- Verein für Geschichte des Bodensees und seiner Umgebung

== Belgium ==
See: List of historical societies in Flanders (in Dutch)

- Heemkring Bilisium
- Society for History in Bruges
- Leuven Historical Society

== Brazil ==
See: List of historical and geographical institutes of Brazil (in Portuguese)

- Associação Nacional de História (ANPUH)

== Canada ==
=== National societies ===
- Canadian Historical Association

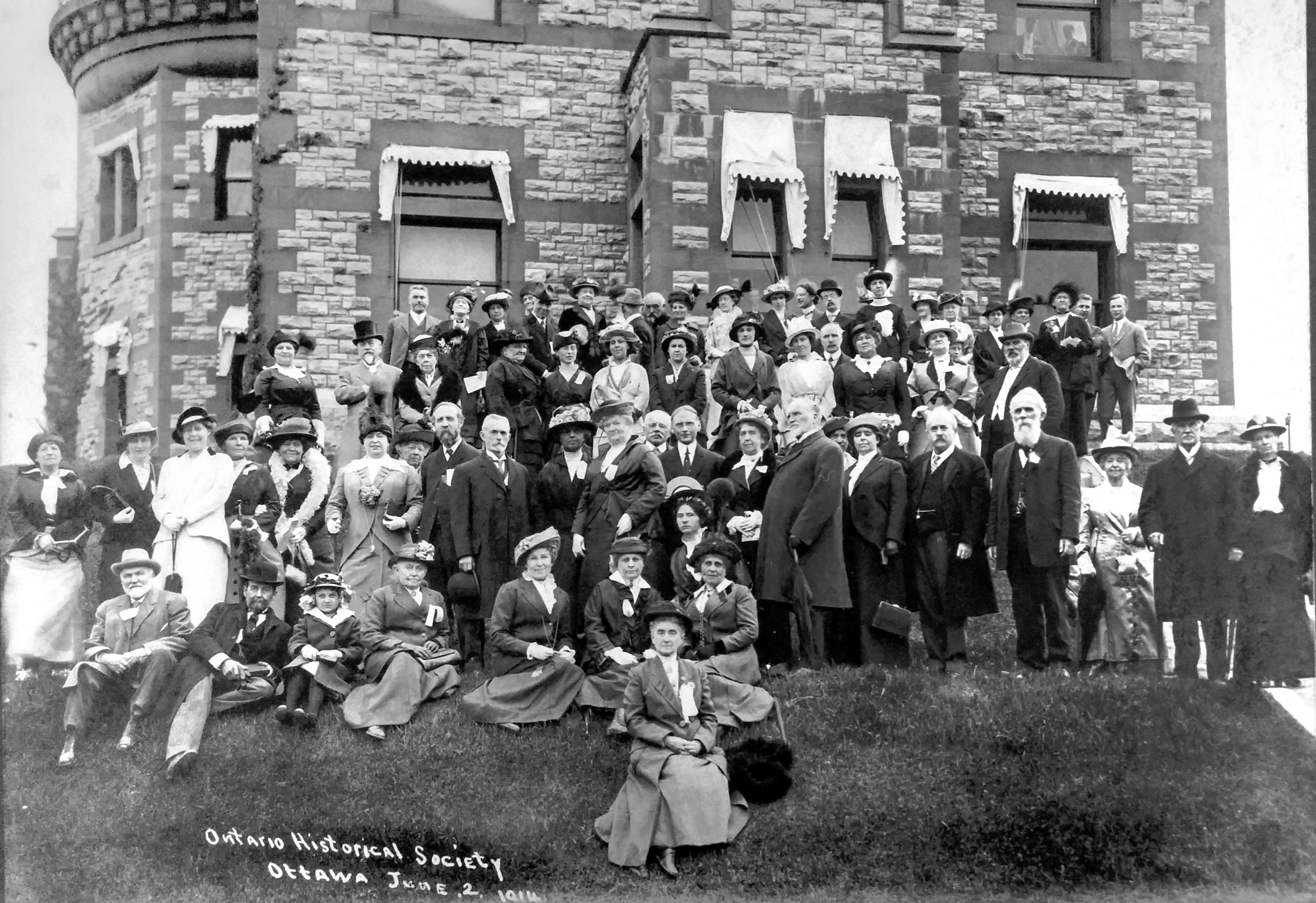
Ontario Historical Society, in 1914

=== Provincial and territorial societies ===
==== Alberta ====
- Old Glenora Conservation Association
- Edmonton and District Historical Society

==== British Columbia ====
- Atlin Historical Society
- Sea Island Heritage Society
- Vancouver Historical Society
- West Vancouver Historical Society

==== Manitoba ====
- Manitoba Historical Society

==== New Brunswick ====
- New Brunswick Historical Society
- Carleton County Historical Society

==== Newfoundland and Labrador ====
- French Shore Historical Society
- Greenspond Historical Society
- Newfoundland and Labrador Historical Society

==== Nova Scotia ====
- Royal Nova Scotia Historical Society

==== Ontario ====
- Ontario Historical Society
- York Pioneers

==== Quebec ====
- Literary and Historical Society of Quebec

==== Saskatchewan ====
- Prince Albert Historical Society

== Chile ==
- Sociedad Chilena de Historia y Geografía (in Spanish)

== China ==
- Association of Chinese Historians

== Czech Republic ==
- Český národní komitét historiků

== Denmark ==
- Danish Historical Society
- Historical Society for Southern Jutland
- Royal Nordic Society of Antiquaries

== Egypt ==
- Egyptian Society for Historical Studies

== Finland ==
See also: List of local associations in Finland (in Finnish); focused on local cultural heritage and history

- Archaeological Society of Finland
- Finnish Antiquarian Society
- Finnish Historical Society
- Kirkkonummi Local History Association
- Turku Historical Society

== France ==
See: List of learned societies of history and archaeology in France

- Société de l'histoire de France
- Société des antiquaires de l'Ouest

== French Polynesia ==
- Tahitian Historical Society

== Germany ==
See: List of historical societies in Germany (in German), List of history workshops in Germany (in German), and List of local history societies in North Rhine-Westphalia (in German)

- Brunswick Historical Society
- Dresden Historical Society
- Geschichte Für Alle
- Verband der Historiker und Historikerinnen Deutschlands
- West Prussian Historical Society

== Ghana ==
- Historical Society of Ghana

== Guatemala ==
- Academia de Geografía e Historia de Guatemala (in Spanish)

== Honduras ==
- Sociedad de Geografía e Historia de Honduras (in Spanish)

== Hungary ==
- Hungarian Historical Society

== India ==
- Pune Aitihasik Vastu Smriti
- Historians India Society (HIS)
- Indian Council of Historical Research (ICHR)
- Indian History and Culture Society (IHCS)

== Lithuania ==
- Lithuanian Institute of History

== Mexico ==
- Academia Mexicana de la Historia, National Academy

== Moldova ==
- Association of Historians of Moldova

== Morocco ==
- Association Marocaine pour La Recherche Historique (est. 1975)

== Netherlands ==
See: List of historical societies in the Netherlands (in Dutch)

- Arnhems Historisch Genootschap Prodesse Conamur
- Historische Kring Bemmel
- Historische Vereniging Heemstede-Bennebroek
- Heemkundevereniging De Bongard Simpelveld-Bocholtz
- Heemkunde Geleen
- Haarlem Historical Society
- Historische Kring Heemskerk
- Vereniging Oud Hoorn
- Historisch Genootschap Midden Kennemerland
- Historical Society of Old Leiden
- Heemkundevereniging Maas- en Swalmdal
- Geschiedenis Melderslo
- Heemkunde Vereniging Nieuwstadt
- Roterodamum Historical Society
- Royal Netherlands Historical Society
- Historisch Genootschap, Utrecht
- Vereniging Oud-Utrecht

== New Zealand ==
- Tauranga Historical Society (Est. 1952)
- The New Zealand Historical Association

== Norway ==
- Hurum History Society
- Romsdal History Club

== Pakistan ==
- Pakistan Museum of Natural History

== Philippines ==
- Philippine Historical Association

== Poland ==
- Polish Historical Society (Poland)

== Portugal ==
- Academia Portuguesa da Historia
- British Historical Society of Portugal

== Russia ==
See also: Historical societies of the Russian Empire (in Russian)

- Free Historical Society
- Russian Historical Association

== Saudi Arabia ==
- Saudi Historical Society

== South Africa ==
- Southern African Historical Society

== Spain ==
- Real Academia de la Historia

== Sweden ==
See: Swedish local history associations (in Swedish)

- Stockholms läns hembygdsförbund

== Switzerland ==
See: Historical societies in Switzerland (in German)

- Historische und Antiquarische Gesellschaft zu Basel
- Historische Gesellschaft Luzern

== Turkey ==
- Turkish Historical Society

== United Kingdom and Crown dependencies ==
=== National societies ===
- Anglo-Norman Text Society
- Black and Asian Studies Association
- British Record Society
- British Records Association
- Canterbury and York Society
- Catholic Record Society
- Crimean War Research Society
- Hadrianic Society
- Harleian Society
- Honourable Society of Cymmrodorion (Wales)
- List and Index Society
- Naval Dockyards Society (NDS)
- Navy Records Society
- Past and Present Society
- Royal Historical Society
- Scottish History Society
- Scottish Record Society
- Selden Society (English law)
- Society for Army Historical Research
- Society of Antiquaries of London
- Society of Antiquaries of Scotland
- Stair Society (Scots law)
- The Historical Association

=== Regional and local societies ===
- Abertay Historical Society Scotland
- Anglesey Antiquarian Society Wales
- Buchanhaven Heritage Society Scotland
- Bristol Record Society
- Clifton Antiquarian Club
- Cumberland and Westmorland Antiquarian and Archaeological Society
- Chetham Society
- Société Jersiaise (Jersey)
- Kent Archaeological Society
- Historic Society of Lancashire and Cheshire
- Record Society of Lancashire and Cheshire
- Lancashire and Cheshire Antiquarian Society
- Lancashire Parish Register Society
- Leicestershire Archaeological and Historical Society
- Lincoln Record Society
- London and Middlesex Archaeological Society
- London Record Society
- Manx Society for the Publication of National Documents
- Norfolk Record Society
- Thoroton Society of Nottinghamshire
- Society of Antiquaries of Newcastle upon Tyne
- Orkney Antiquarian Society
- Oxfordshire Architectural and Historical Society
- Oxford Historical Society
- South Wales Record Society
- Spalding Club (northern Scotland)
- Surrey Archaeological Society
- Surrey Record Society
- Surtees Society (Durham and Northumberland)
- Sussex Archaeological Society
- Wiltshire Archaeological and Natural History Society
- Wiltshire Record Society
- Yorkshire Archaeological and Historical Society
- Yorkshire Philosophical Society

== Uruguay ==
- Instituto Histórico y Geográfico del Uruguay (in Spanish)

== Venezuela ==
- Academia Nacional de la Historia

== Aviation historical societies ==
=== United States ===
- Aircraft Engine Historical Society, Huntsville, Alabama
- American Aviation Historical Society, Santa Ana, California
- B-26 Marauder Historical Society, at Pima Air & Space Museum, Tucson, Arizona
- Colorado Aviation Historical Society, Denver, Colorado
  - Cortez Aviation Heritage Society, Cortez, Colorado
  - Pueblo Historical Aircraft Society, Pueblo, Colorado
- Florida Aviation Historical Society
- Hawaii Aviation Preservation Society
- Maine Aviation Historical Society
- Massachusetts Aviation Historical Society
- Missouri Aviation Historical Society, St. Louis, Missouri
- New Hampshire Aviation Historical Society
- Oregon Aviation Historical Society
- United States Airways Heritage Association

=== Other countries ===
- Air-Britain, United Kingdom
- Aviation Historical Society of Australia, Australia
- Aviation Historical Society of New Zealand, New Zealand
- Tramway Historical Society, New Zealand
- Aviation Historical Society of the Northern Territory, Canada
- Bod? Aviation Historical Society, Norway
- Canadian Aviation Historical Society, Canada
- Ontario Aviation Historical Society, Canada
- Aviation Archaeology in Greece, Greece
- European Aviation Historical Society
- Historical Aviation Society of Ireland, Ireland
- Civil Aviation Historical Society, Australia (Air Services Australia)
- Swedish Aviation Historical Society, Sweden
- Ulster Aviation Society, Northern Ireland
- West Beach Aviation Group, Australia
- Instituto de Historia y Cultura Aeronáuticas, Spain

== Denominational societies ==
- American Baptist Historical Society
- Baptist History and Heritage Society
- Disciples of Christ Historical Society
- Evangelical & Reformed Historical Society (German Reformed Church)
- Historical Society of the Episcopal Church
- Lutheran Historical Society of the Mid-Atlantic
- National Episcopal Historians and Archivists
- Presbyterian Historical Society

== Time-period oriented societies ==
=== United States ===
- American Antiquarian Society
- The Historical Society
- Medieval Academy of America
- Plymouth Antiquarian Society

== Subject matter-based historical societies ==
=== Canada ===
- Canadian Society for the History of Medicine
- Miles Canyon Historical Society
- Photographic Historical Society of Canada

=== India ===
- Kokborok tei Hukumu Mission

=== United Kingdom ===
- Historical Diving Society
- Historical Maritime Society
- Jewish Historical Society of England
- Plastics Historical Society
- Nautical Archaeology Society
- Railway and Canal Historical Society

=== United States ===
- Anthracite Railroads Historical Society
- Conrail Historical Society
- Cotton Belt Rail Historical Society
- Filipino American National Historical Society
- Great Northern Railway Historical Society
- John Shaw Billings History of Medicine Society
- MCRD Museum Historical Society
- National Railway Historical Society
- North Jersey Electric Railway Historical Society
- Polish Historical Society (United States)
- The Pennsylvania-Reading Seashore Lines Historical Society
- Theatre Historical Society of America
- Ulster & Delaware Railroad Historical Society
- United Railroad Historical Society of New Jersey

== See also ==
- List of genealogical societies
- List of Antiquarian Societies
- List of halls and walks of fame
- List of royal societies in the Commonwealth of Nations
- Text publication society
