= 1851 United Kingdom census =

Census of the population of the United Kingdom

Census 1851
- 30 March 1851

General information
- Country: United Kingdom

The United Kingdom Census of 1851 recorded the people residing in every household on the night of Sunday 30 March 1851, and was the second of the UK censuses to include details of household members. However, this census added considerably to the fields recorded in the earlier 1841 UK Census, providing additional details of ages, relationships and origins, making the 1851 census a rich source of information for both demographers and genealogists.

The 1851 census for England and Wales was opened to public inspection at the Public Record Office in 1912 (the 100-year closure rule was not in effect at the time), and is now available from The National Archives as part of class HO 107. The 1851 census for Scotland is available at the General Register Office for Scotland. An 1851 census was taken in Ireland but most of the records have been destroyed; those that remain are held by the Public Record Office of Northern Ireland (for those counties of Ireland which remain in the UK) or the National Archives of Ireland (for those counties now in the Republic of Ireland).

The total population of England, Wales and Scotland was recorded as 21,121,967.

The census was held concurrently with a census of religion in England and Wales, which recorded religious institutions and attendance at religious services on 30 March. The returns for this are also held at The National Archives as class HO 129.

== Developments from previous censuses ==
The 1851 census was the first to record the full details of birth location for individuals. Where 1841 had only recorded if an individual was born in a county, the 1851 census states the county and parish or town of birth as well. The purpose behind asking for this information was to answer one of the critical questions of the time which was the rate and intensity of migration from rural to urban areas. The results confirmed there had been a significant shift from the countryside to the towns.

The 1851 census was the first to record each person's marital status and relationship to the head of the household, as well as details of disability being recorded—with a field for recording the information that an individual was "blind, deaf or imbecile". Each individual's exact age was also recorded (to the nearest year) rather than rounding adult ages down to the nearest five years.

In 1851, much greater detail was asked about people's occupations than in previous censuses. This enabled government analysis of occupations into "classes" and "sub-classes". Masters in trade and manufacture were asked to state the word "master" after the description of their occupation and to state the number of men employed on the day of the census. A full transcript of the 1851 Census can be found online.

Full documentation for the 1851 population census, including census forms and enumerator instructions, is available from the North Atlantic Population Project.

=== Census of religion ===
The Government also conducted a census in England and Wales of churches and chapels, endowments, sittings, attendance at religious services on Sunday 30 March 1851 and average numbers during the preceding twelve months. Reports were collected from local ministers. The attendance count was 10,896,066 (60.8%) out of a population of 17,927,609. There were 5,292,551 (48.6% of total attendants) attending Church of England services, 4,536,264 (41.6%) attending other Protestant churches, and 383,630 (3.5%) attending Catholic services. This was a unique experiment, not repeated at any later census.

The religious census returns are now held in The National Archives as class HO 129.

== Government analysis ==
Since the 1841 Census the population of Ireland had dropped by 1.7 million due to mass starvation caused by the Great Famine, as well as emigration abroad.

The additional information on ages and occupations permitted considerable contemporary analysis of the census data for England and Wales. Not only were 332 different occupations analysed by age group, but they were also correlated with death records from civil registration, allowing statisticians, led by William Farr, "to compare the living in each well defined occupation with the number dying registered at the corresponding ages; and thus to determine the influence of employment on health and life".

Examples from his conclusions include:

Miners die in undue proportions, particularly at the advanced ages, when their strength begins to decline... Tailors die in considerable numbers at the younger ages (25–45)... Labourers' mortality is as nearly the same rate as that of the whole population, except in the very advanced ages, when the Poor Law apparently affords inadequate relief to the worn-out workman.

== Genealogical value ==
The 1851 census is seen as one of the key sources for British genealogical research of the nineteenth century. The information about the relationship of individuals to the head of household enables relationships between people to be established accurately. Furthermore, the inclusion of exact ages and details of each person's place of birth, provides the researcher with a pointer to the location of birth or baptism records. In many cases, this allows the researcher to pin-down the parish of birth with relative ease: in other cases, the situation is not so simple.

An example of the problems encountered is that the census may accurately record a person's place of birth, although their baptism (which may be the only record relating to their birth) may be in a different place. Conversely, a person may have been born and baptised in one place, but brought up in a different place, which is the one they remember as their place of origin and duly record it as such in the census. A further problem is that the information about a household was normally provided to the census enumerator by the head of household—and heads of household varied in the conscientiousness with which they elicited information from each person in the household. In cases where a person was born outside the country, only the country of origin is given (not the location within the country). Hence, for example, there are many people in the English census whose place of birth is given simply as "Scotland".

== Data availability and publication ==
The 1851 schedules have been digitized and are available at subscription websites. The schedules are of high importance to genealogists since 1851 was the first year in which a place of birth or parish was recorded. Microdata from the 1851 population census are freely available through the North Atlantic Population Project.

=== Religious census ===
The religious census returns (The National Archives, HO 129) are available to download free of charge as part of the Digital Microfilm project.

The returns for a number of counties have been published by county record societies and similar bodies.

- Tiller, Kate, ed. (2010). Berkshire Religious Census 1851. Berkshire Record Society. Vol. 14. Reading: Berkshire Record Society. ISBN 978-0954871642.
- Thompson, David Michael, ed. (2014). Religious Life in mid-19th Century Cambridgeshire and Huntingdonshire: the returns of the 1851 census of religious worship. Cambridgeshire Records Society. Vol. 21. Cambridge: Cambridge Records Society. ISBN 9780904323238.
- Munden, Alan Frederick, ed. (2019). The Religious Census of Cumbria, 1851: Cumberland, Westmorland and Furness. Surtees Society. Vol. 223. Woodbridge: Surtees Society. ISBN 9780854440719.
- Tranter, Margery; Barton, David A.; Pauls, Eli, eds. (1995). The Derbyshire Returns to the 1851 Religious Census. Derbyshire Record Society. Vol. 23. Chesterfield: Derbyshire Record Society.
- Munden, Alan Frederick, ed. (2015). Religious Census of Bristol and Gloucestershire, 1851. Gloucestershire Record Series. Vol. 29. Cheltenham: Bristol and Gloucestershire Archaeological Society. ISBN 9780900197888.
- Watts, Michael J., ed. (1988). Religion in Victorian Nottinghamshire: the religious census of 1851. Centre for Local History Record Series. Vol. 7. Nottingham: University of Nottingham, Department of Adult Education. ISBN 1850410208. (2 vols.)
- Ede, Janet; Virgoe, Norma, eds. (1998). Religious Worship in Norfolk: the 1851 census of accommodation and attendance at worship. Norfolk Record Society. Vol. 62. Norwich: Norfolk Record Society. ISBN 0-9511600-8-7.
- Ward, Graham S., ed. (2007). The 1851 Religious Census of Northamptonshire. Northamptonshire Record Society. Vol. 43. Northampton: Northamptonshire Record Society. ISBN 978-0901275653.
- Munden, Alan Frederick, ed. (2012). The Religious Census of 1851: Northumberland and County Durham. Surtees Society. Vol. 216. Woodbridge: Surtees Society. ISBN 9780854440719.
- Watts, Michael R., ed. (1988). Religion in Victorian Nottinghamshire: the religious census of 1851. Centre for Local History Record Series. Vol. 7. Nottingham: University of Nottingham. ISBN 1850410208.
- Tiller, Kate, ed. (1987). Church and Chapel in Oxfordshire, 1851: the return of the census of religious worship. Oxfordshire Record Society. Vol. 55. Oxford: Oxfordshire Record Society. ISBN 0902509195.
- Tomalin, Peter (2004). "The returns to the 1851 religious census by the Rutland parishes in the Stamford registration district". Rutland Record. 24: 169–74.
- Field, Clive D., ed. (2004). Church and Chapel in Early Victorian Shropshire: returns from the 1851 Census of Religious Worship. Shropshire Record Series. Vol. 8. Keele: Centre for Local History, University of Keele. ISBN 0953602060.
- Totty, Richard, ed. (2024). The 1851 Religious Census for Staffordshire. Collections for a History of Staffordshire, 4th ser. Vol. 28. Stafford: Staffordshire Record Society. ISBN 9780901719195.
- Robinson, David, ed. (1997). The 1851 Religious Census: Surrey. Surrey Record Society. Vol. 35. Guildford: Surrey Record Society.
- Vickers, John Ashley, ed. (1989). The Religious Census of Sussex 1851. Sussex Record Society. Vol. 75. Lewes: Sussex Record Society. ISBN 085445036X.
- Geary, Keith, ed. (2014). The 1851 Census of Religious Worship: church, chapel and meeting place in mid nineteenth-century Warwickshire. Dugdale Society. Vol. 47. Stratford-upon-Avon: Dugdale Society. ISBN 9780852200971.
- Wolffe, John, ed. (2000–2005). Yorkshire Returns of the 1851 Census of Religious Worship. Borthwick Texts & Calendars. Vol. 25, 31, 32. York: Borthwick Institute of Historical Research. ISBN 0903857952. ISBN 1904497101. ISBN 190449711X. (3 vols.)

== See also ==
- Census in the United Kingdom
- List of United Kingdom censuses

== Notes ==
Preceded by 1841	UK census 1851	Succeeded by 1861
