= Text publication society =

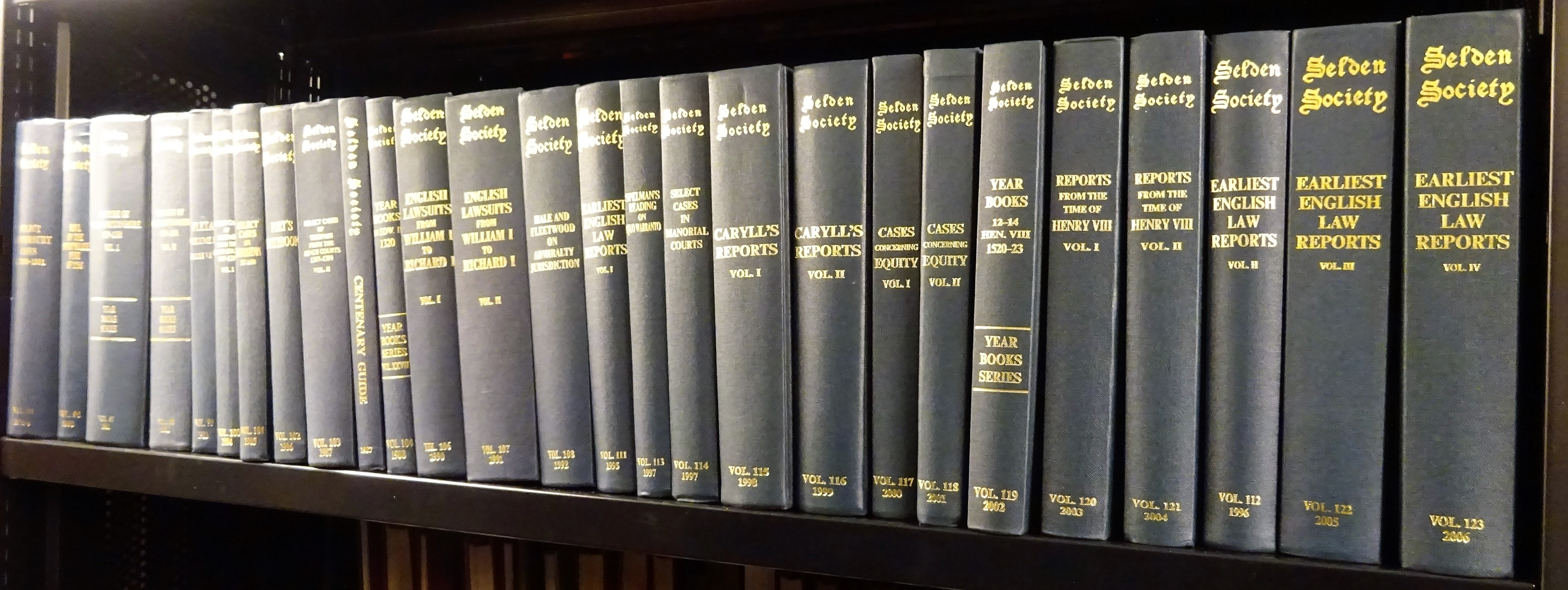
Volumes relating to legal history published by the Selden Society

A text publication society is a learned society which publishes (either as its sole function, or as a principal function) scholarly editions of old works of historical or literary interest, or archival documents. In addition to full texts, a text publication society may publish translations, calendars and indexes.

Members of the society (private individuals or institutions) pay an annual subscription, in return for which they either automatically receive a copy of each volume as it is published, or (as in the case of, for example, the Royal Historical Society) are eligible to purchase volumes at favourable members' rates. Some societies attempt to keep to a regular cycle of publishing (generally one volume per year, as in the case of the London Record Society and the Canterbury and York Society; the Royal Historical Society, exceptionally, aims for two volumes per year). Others, however, publish on an irregular and occasional basis, as the completion of editorial work allows. Volumes are usually also made available for sale to non-members, but the price is invariably higher than that paid (either as the retail price or through subscriptions) by members, thereby establishing an incentive for interested parties to join. The model originated and is most commonly found in the United Kingdom, but has also been adopted in other countries.

In the 19th century, when many societies were founded, they were sometimes known as book clubs. They have also been termed printing clubs. Those that publish exclusively archival material are often known as record societies or records societies.

== Historical development ==
The principle of subscription publishing – funding the publication of a volume by securing multiple advance subscriptions from individuals interested in buying the final product – was first established in the 17th century, and routinely adopted during the 18th. The idea of extending the model to the membership of a society was initiated by the Roxburghe Club, founded in 1812 as a convivial association of bibliophiles, but which rapidly introduced the principle that each member should sponsor the publication of an edition of a rare work of interest to members, and that other volumes would be published by the Club collectively. In both cases, the volumes were intended for distribution to the entire membership. The Club's first publication, donated by William Bolland and issued in 1814, was the Earl of Surrey's translation of parts of Virgil's Aeneid, originally printed in 1557.

One early Roxburghe Club member (from 1822) was Sir Walter Scott, who was inspired by it to establish the Bannatyne Club to print works of interest for Scottish tradition, literature, and history. Other special-interest societies followed. In contrast to the exclusive Roxburghe Club (which had an elite membership and issued its publications as luxurious limited editions), most had broad membership criteria, and had as their primary objective the dissemination of valuable historical texts as widely as possible. Nevertheless, their activities tended to appeal to the "monied and educated" classes: in 1838, 20% of the Camden Society's members were clergymen, 9% held legal qualifications, and 36% were Fellows of the Society of Antiquaries.

Success being dependent on fund-raising and the attraction of new members, the early societies often suffered from financial and organisational troubles. Controversy followed Frederick James Furnivall, a prime mover in many of the early ventures. In the second half of the 19th century the government-sponsored Rolls Series took over some of the territory of the amateur societies, particularly in respect of the publication of chronicles. The productions of several of the early societies included literary texts, but by the end of the 19th century, the majority of societies were tending to focus instead on the publication of archival records. This continued to be the pattern in the 20th century.

The Durham-based Surtees Society, founded in 1834 and modelled in part on the Scottish Bannatyne and Maitland Clubs, was the first English society to adopt a specifically regional remit, in its case the elucidation of the history of the area constituting the ancient kingdom of Northumbria. Its establishment was deeply rooted in local pride: in an early prospectus, James Raine (its principal founder and first secretary) drew attention to just a few unpublished manuscripts of Durham interest, "which, in these times, few individuals would incur the risk of printing at their own cost; but which nevertheless, afford even singly, how much more collectively, the most valuable materials to those who are anxious to study rightly the History of our forefathers under its different characters". The Chetham Society, founded in 1843, concerned itself in much the same way with the counties of Lancashire and Cheshire. From the 1880s onwards, many societies focused on a single county. A particularly energetic advocate was W. P. W. Phillimore, who was active in the foundation of the British Record Society, Scottish Record Society, Thoroton Society, Canterbury and York Society, and Irish Record Society.

Several county archaeological and historical societies undertook text publication as just one among a broader range of activities, and in certain cases – for example, the Yorkshire Archaeological and Historical Society and the Kent Archaeological Society – continue to do so. In other cases, a new society has broken away from its parent archaeological society to become an independent body dedicated solely to text publication: examples include the Surrey Record Society and the Wiltshire Record Society.

In the 21st century, partly as a result of the growing quantity of historical research materials now available online, many societies have experienced a significant decline in membership numbers, and consequent difficulties in maintaining their traditional business model. Societies have responded to the challenge in various ways, including by selectively uploading some of their publications to the World Wide Web, while continuing to publish other materials in print.

== List of societies ==
=== United Kingdom and Ireland ===
==== Active ====
===== Began publication 1800–1849 =====
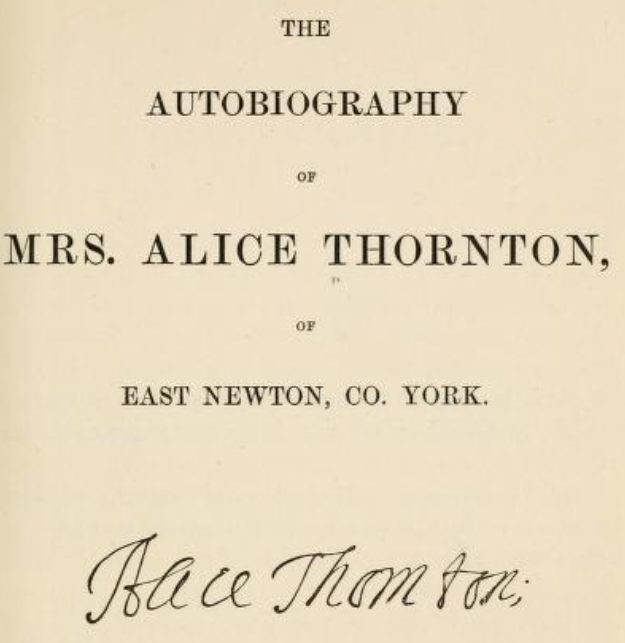
Title page of Alice Thornton's autobiography, dating from the 17th century and published by the Surtees Society in 1875

- Roxburghe Club (founded 1812): publishes editions of rare early printed and unpublished manuscript works, often in facsimile.
- Surtees Society (founded 1834): publishes mainly archival material relating to the counties of Durham and Northumberland.
- Camden Society (founded 1838): published editions of texts of value for British history, including unpublished manuscripts and rare early printed books. In 1897 it merged with the Royal Historical Society, which continues to publish material in what is now known as the Camden Series.
- Irish Archaeological Society (founded 1840): published texts relating to the history of Ireland.
- Chetham Society (founded 1843): publishes editions of texts relating to the counties of Lancashire and Cheshire.
- Ray Society (founded 1844): publishes works of natural history, mainly British.
- Hakluyt Society (founded 1846): publishes editions and translations of primary records of voyages, travels and other geographical material relating to all parts of the globe.

===== Began publication 1850–1899 =====
- Early English Text Society (founded 1864): publishes editions of early English-language texts (in particular texts in Old English and Middle English), especially those previously unpublished.
- Harleian Society (founded 1869): publishes editions of the heraldic visitations of England and Wales, and other manuscript sources relating to genealogy and heraldry.
- Cumberland and Westmorland Antiquarian and Archaeological Society (founded as an archaeological society in 1866: it began publishing texts in its Extra Series in 1877, in its Tract Series in 1882, in its Record or Chartulary Series in 1897, and in its Parish Register Section series in 1912): publishes editions of records relating to the historic counties of Cumberland and Westmorland.
- Record Society of Lancashire and Cheshire (founded 1878): publishes editions of records relating to the historic counties of Lancashire and Cheshire.
- Staffordshire Record Society (founded 1879 as the William Salt Archaeological Society; took its present name 1936): publishes editions of records relating to Staffordshire.
- London Topographical Society (founded 1880): publishes editions of source material (including maps, plans, views and texts), and also modern scholarly research, relating to the history and topography of London.
- Scottish Text Society (founded 1882): publishes scholarly editions of significant Scottish literary texts, especially Middle Scots works of the 16th to 18th centuries.
- Pali Text Society (founded 1881): publishes editions and translations of Buddhist scriptures in the Pāli language, and other related texts.

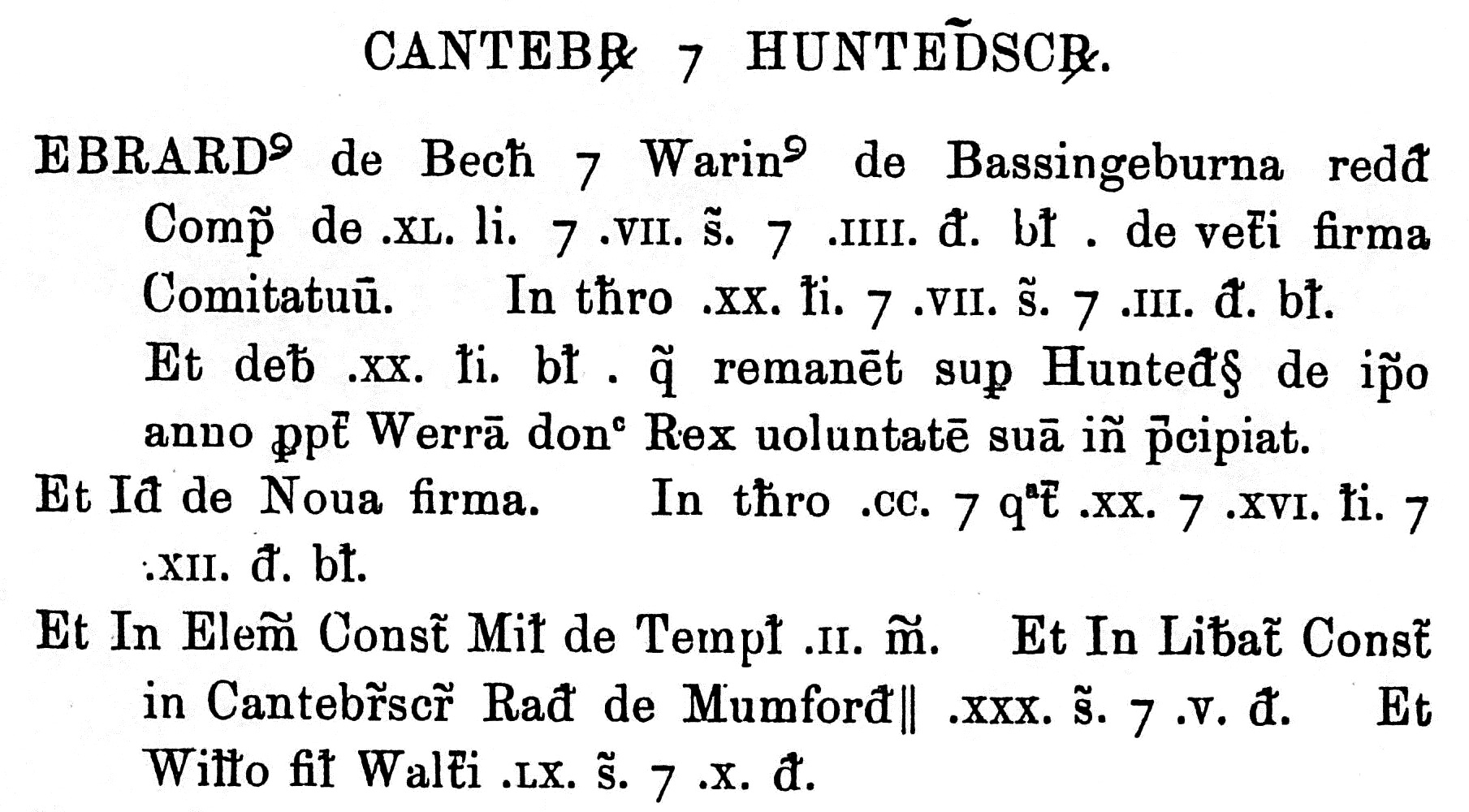
Extract from the Pipe roll for 21 Henry II (1174–5), as published by the Pipe Roll Society in 1897 using record type

- Pipe Roll Society (founded 1883 by the Public Record Office): publishes editions of the medieval English Pipe rolls, and other related archival texts.
- Oxford Historical Society (founded 1884): publishes editions of records relating to the history of the city of Oxford and the historic county of Oxfordshire.
- Palestine Pilgrims' Text Society (founded 1884): published editions and translations of texts relating to the history of pilgrimage to the Holy Land. Absorbed in 1896 by the Palestine Exploration Fund, which continues to publish texts on an occasional basis.
- Yorkshire Archaeological and Historical Society (founded as an archaeological society in 1863: its Record Series began publication in 1885): publishes editions of records relating to the history of Yorkshire.
- Huguenot Society of Great Britain and Ireland (founded as the Huguenot Society of London in 1885): among other activities, publishes editions of records relating to the history of French Protestant migration.
- Somerset Record Society (founded 1886 as an offshoot of the Somerset Archaeological and Natural History Society): publishes editions of records relating to the history of the county of Somerset.
- Scottish History Society (founded 1886): publishes editions of texts relating to the civil, religious, and social history of Scotland.
- Selden Society (founded 1887): publishes significant records relating to the history of English law.
- British Record Society (founded 1889): publishes indexes to British (predominantly English) public records, especially name indexes to probate records; and also texts of Hearth Tax returns from the 1660s and 1670s.
- Thoresby Society (founded 1889): a general historical society concerned with the city of Leeds and its district, which among other activities publishes editions of historical documents.
- Henry Bradshaw Society (founded 1890): publishes editions of rare liturgical texts.
- Navy Records Society (founded 1893): publishes editions of historical records relating to the Royal Navy.
- Worcestershire Historical Society (founded 1893): publishes editions of records relating to the history of Worcestershire.
- Scottish Record Society (founded 1897: previously the Scottish section of the British Record Society): publishes calendars and indexes to public records and private muniments and manuscripts relating to Scotland and Scottish affairs.
- Lancashire Parish Register Society (founded 1897): publishes editions of the parish registers of Lancashire.
- Irish Texts Society (founded 1898): publishes editions and translations of texts in the Irish language.

===== Began publication 1900–1949 =====
- Sussex Record Society (founded 1901): publishes editions of records relating to the historic county of Sussex.
- Thoroton Society (founded as an archaeological and historical society in 1897: its Records Series began publication in 1903): publishes editions of records relating to the history of Nottinghamshire.
- Catholic Record Society (founded 1904): publishes editions of records relating to Reformation and post-Reformation Catholicism. Although still an active record publisher, the Society has broadened its interests to become a general historical society.
- Canterbury and York Society (founded 1904): publishes editions of medieval bishops' registers and other ecclesiastical records.
- Devon and Cornwall Record Society (founded 1904): publishes editions of records relating to the history of the counties of Devon and Cornwall.
- Malone Society (founded 1906): publishes editions of plays and other documents relating to English theatre and drama before 1642.
- Lincoln Record Society (founded 1910): publishes editions of records relating to the history of the county and diocese of Lincoln.
- Kent Archaeological Society (founded as an archaeological society in 1857: its Records Branch began publishing in 1912): publishes editions of records relating to the history of the county of Kent.
- Surrey Record Society (founded 1912 as an offshoot of the Surrey Archaeological Society): publishes editions of records relating to the history of the county of Surrey.
- Bedfordshire Historical Record Society (founded 1912): publishes editions of records relating to the history of Bedfordshire.
- Oxfordshire Record Society (founded 1919): publishes editions of records relating to the history of Oxfordshire.
- Dugdale Society (founded 1920): publishes editions of records relating to the history of Warwickshire.
- Northamptonshire Record Society (founded 1920): publishes editions of records relating to the history of Northamptonshire.
- Bristol Record Society (founded 1929): publishes editions of records relating to the history of the city of Bristol.
- Norfolk Record Society (founded 1930): publishes editions of records relating to the history of the county of Norfolk.
- Scottish Gaelic Texts Society (founded 1934): publishes editions of texts in the Scottish Gaelic language, with English translations.
- Stair Society (founded 1934): publishes texts and records relating to the history of Scots law.
- Buckinghamshire Record Society (founded c.1936 as the records branch of the Buckinghamshire Archaeological Society; became an independent society c.1946): publishes editions of records relating to the history of Buckinghamshire.
- Anglo-Norman Text Society (founded 1937): publishes editions of texts of interest for the study of the Anglo-Norman language, Anglo-Norman literature, and the Norman period of English history.
- Wiltshire Record Society (founded 1939 as the records branch of the Wiltshire Archaeological and Natural History Society; became an independent society 1967): publishes editions of records relating to the history of Wiltshire.

===== Began publication 1950– =====
- Bristol & Gloucestershire Archaeological Society (founded as an archaeological society in 1876: its Records Section began publication in 1952, and its separate Record Series in 1988): publishes editions of records relating to the history of Gloucestershire and (to a lesser extent) Bristol.
- Suffolk Records Society (founded 1957): publishes editions of records relating to the history of the county of Suffolk.
- Dorset Record Society (founded 1962): publishes editions of records relating to the history of the county of Dorset.
- London Record Society (founded 1964): publishes editions of archival and historical material relating to London.
- List and Index Society (founded 1965): publishes editions, calendars and lists of British historical records, predominantly of material held in The National Archives (formerly the Public Record Office).
- Association for Scottish Literary Studies (founded 1970): a general society concerned with the promotion and study of Scottish literature, one of its roles is to publish editions of out of print Scottish texts in its Annual Volumes series.
- Cambridgeshire Records Society (founded as Cambridge Antiquarian Records Society c.1973; took its present name c.1987): publishes editions of records relating to the history of Cambridgeshire.
- Derbyshire Record Society (founded 1977, inheriting the publication work of the Derbyshire Archaeological Society): publishes editions of records relating to the history of Derbyshire.
- Rutland Record Society (founded 1979; merged in 1991 with Rutland Local History Society to form the Rutland Local History & Record Society): publishes editions of records relating to the history of the county of Rutland.
- South Wales Record Society (founded 1982 as the successor to the South Wales and Monmouth Record Society): publishes editions of records relating to the history of South Wales.
- Army Records Society (founded 1984): publishes editions of manuscripts and records relating to the history of the British Army.
- Hertfordshire Record Society (founded 1985): publishes editions of records relating to the history of Hertfordshire.
- Church of England Record Society (founded 1991): publishes editions of records relating to the history of the Church of England from the 16th century onwards.
- Berkshire Record Society (founded 1993): publishes editions of records relating to the history of Berkshire.

==== Defunct, or no longer active in text publication ====
===== Began publication 1800–1849 =====
- Bannatyne Club (founded c.1823; dissolved 1861): published works of Scottish history, poetry, and literature.
- Maitland Club (founded 1828; dissolved 1859): published early Scottish texts.
- Abbotsford Club (founded in 1833 or 1834; dissolved c.1866): published editions of a variety of literary and archival texts, including many of Scottish interest, and others in Middle English.
- Welsh Manuscripts Society (founded in 1837; dissolved c.1874): published editions of literary and archival texts relating to the history of Wales and Britain.
- English Historical Society (founded c.1838; dissolved c.1856): published editions of medieval English chronicles and Anglo-Saxon charters.
- Spalding Club (founded 1839; dissolved c.1870; revived as the New Spalding Club 1886; dissolved c.1924; revived as the Third Spalding Club c.1929; dissolved c.1960): published editions of texts relating to the history of Aberdeen, Aberdeenshire and northern Scotland.
- Percy Society (founded 1840; dissolved 1852): published editions of rare English poems and songs.
- Shakespeare Society (founded 1841; dissolved 1853)
- Parker Society (founded 1841; dissolved c.1855): published editions of texts relating to the Church of England in the 16th century.
- Ælfric Society (founded 1842; dissolved 1856): published editions of Old English texts.
- Spottiswoode Society (founded c.1844; dissolved c.1856): published editions of texts relating to the ecclesiastical history of Scotland.
- Caxton Society (founded 1844; dissolved c.1854): published editions of medieval texts relating to English history, especially chronicles.
- Hanserd Knollys Society (founded c.1846; dissolved c.1854): published editions of 17th-century texts relating to the early history of the Baptist denomination.
- Iona Club (founded c.1847): published just one volume of editions of documents relating to the history of the West Highlands of Scotland and the Hebrides.
- Manx Society for the Publication of National Documents (founded 1858; dissolved c.1893): published editions of historical documents relating to the Isle of Man.

===== Began publication 1850–1899 =====
- Scottish Burgh Records Society (founded c.1868; dissolved c.1967): published editions of records relating to the burghs of Scotland.
- Chaucer Society (founded 1868; dissolved c.1914): published editions of the writings of Geoffrey Chaucer, especially from manuscripts.
- Ballad Society (founded 1868): published rare English poems and songs, especially folksongs.
- Grampian Club (founded c.1869; dissolved c.1891): published editions of historical and genealogical Scottish texts.
- Hunterian Club (founded 1871; dissolved c.1902): published reprints of old or out of print texts of importance to Scottish history and culture.
- Société Jersiaise (founded 1873 as a general antiquarian society, with text publication among its activities; ceased systematic text publication 1924): published editions of historical documents relating to the Bailiwick of Jersey; remains active in other spheres.
- New Shakspere Society (founded 1873; dissolved 1894): published texts illustrating the works and times of William Shakespeare
- Wyclif Society (founded 1882; dissolved c.1904): published editions of the works of John Wycliffe.
- Aungervyle Society (founded c.1881; dissolved c.1886): published editions of early printed texts.
- Clarendon Historical Society (founded c.1882; dissolved c.1888): published editions of 17th- and 18th-century texts relating to the Wars of the Three Kingdoms and Jacobitism.
- Saint Paul's Ecclesiological Society, an offshoot of the Cambridge Camden Society
- North Riding Record Society (founded c.1884; dissolved c.1897): published editions of records relating to the North Riding of Yorkshire.
- Middlesex County Record Society (founded c.1886; dissolved c.1892): published four volumes of calendars of quarter sessions records for the county of Middlesex.
- Hampshire Record Society (founded c.1889; dissolved c.1897): published editions of records relating to the history of Hampshire. Now succeeded by the Hampshire Record Series, sponsored by the Hampshire Record Office, which began publication in 1976.
- Lincolnshire Record Society (founded 1889; dissolved c.1891): published one volume relating to the history of Lincolnshire. Succeeded by Lincoln Record Society.
- Honourable Society of Cymmrodorion (founded 1751 as a literary society: published its Record Series between 1892 and 1936): published editions of texts relating to the history of Wales; remains active in other spheres.

===== Began publication 1900–1949 =====
- Scottish Clergy Society (founded c.1901; dissolved c.1909): published editions of texts relating to the history of the Church of Scotland in the 16th and 17th centuries.
- Cantilupe Society (founded 1905; dissolved c.1932): published editions of records relating to the cathedral and diocese of Hereford.
- British Society of Franciscan Studies (founded c.1908; dissolved c.1937): published editions of texts relating to the history of the Franciscan Order of Friars Minor in the British Isles.
- Rymour Club (founded 1903; dissolved c.1928): published traditional Scottish poems, ballads and rhymes.
- Historical Society of West Wales (founded c.1912; dissolved c.1929): published editions of records relating to the history of West Wales.
- South Wales and Monmouth Record Society (began publication 1949; fell into abeyance c.1963): published editions of records relating to the history of South Wales and Monmouthshire. Succeeded by the South Wales Record Society.

===== Began publication 1950– =====
- Derbyshire Archaeological Society (founded as an archaeological society in 1878: volumes in its Records Series were published 1966–1977): published editions of records relating to the history of Derbyshire. Remains active in other spheres, but superseded in record publication by the Derbyshire Record Society.
- Society of Antiquaries of Newcastle upon Tyne (founded as an antiquarian society in 1813; three volumes in its Records Series were published 1968–1987): published editions of records relating to the history of Northumberland and Newcastle upon Tyne; remains active in other spheres.

=== Canada ===
- Champlain Society (founded 1905): publishes documents relating to Canadian history.
- Hudson's Bay Record Society (founded 1938; dissolved 1983): published records of the Hudson's Bay Company
- Osgoode Society
- Rupert's Land Record Society

=== France ===
- Société des anciens textes français (founded 1875): publishes medieval French documents in langue d'oïl and langue d'oc.

=== Germany ===
- Monumenta Germaniae Historica (founded 1819; nationalised 1935): publishes primary sources, both chronicle and archival, for the study of German history from the end of the Roman Empire to 1500.

=== Iceland ===
- Íslenzk fornrit (founded 1928): publishes editions of Old Icelandic texts.

=== Italy ===
- The Istituto Storico Italiano per il Medio Evo (Italian Historical Institute for the Middle Ages) continues the work started by Ludovico Antonio Muratori in the early 18th century.

=== South Africa ===
- Historical Publications Southern Africa (founded 1918 as the Van Riebeeck Society): publishes editions of texts relating to southern African history.

== See also ==
- Bibliothèque de l'École des Chartes
- Bibliothèque des Ecoles françaises d'Athènes et de Rome
- Documentary editing
- Revue de l'Orient Latin, French collection of medieval documents
- Medieval Chronicle Society
- List of antiquarian societies

== Bibliography ==
=== Critical studies ===
- Gregory, E. David (2006). Victorian Songhunters: the recovery and editing of English vernacular ballads and folk lyrics, 1820–1883. Lanham, Md.: Scarecrow. ISBN 0810857030.
- Jenkinson, Hilary (1980) [1956]. "Archivists and printers". In Ellis, Roger H.; Walne, Peter (eds.). Selected Writings of Sir Hilary Jenkinson. Gloucester: Alan Sutton. pp. 330–38. ISBN 0904387526.
- Johnson, Cuthbert; Ward, Anthony (1987). "Some British societies for the publication of studies and ancient texts: their contribution towards liturgical science". Ephemerides Liturgicae. 101: 229–245.
- Levine, Philippa (1986). The Amateur and the Professional: antiquarians, historians and archaeologists in Victorian England, 1838–1886. Cambridge: Cambridge University Press. ISBN 0-521-30635-3.

=== Lists of publications ===
- Mullins, E. L. C. (1958). Texts and Calendars: an analytical guide to serial publications. Guides and Handbooks. Vol. 7. London: Royal Historical Society. [lists publications relating to English and Welsh history issued between 1802 and 1957]
- Mullins, E. L. C. (1983). Texts and Calendars II: an analytical guide to serial publications. Guides and Handbooks. Vol. 12. London: Royal Historical Society. ISBN 0861931009. [lists publications relating to English and Welsh history issued between 1957 and 1982]
- Stevenson, David; Stevenson, Wendy B. (1987). Scottish Texts and Calendars: an analytical guide to serial publications. Guides and Handbooks. Vol. 14. London: Scottish History Society and Royal Historical Society. ISBN 0861931009. [lists publications relating to Scottish history issued up to 1985]
