= Medieval English episcopal register =

An Episcopal register (Latin: Episcopi registrum, or Bishop's Register) in the English Medieval Ages was a document, often consisting of several volumes, in which a bishop's or archbishop's activity was recorded.

== Creation and purpose ==
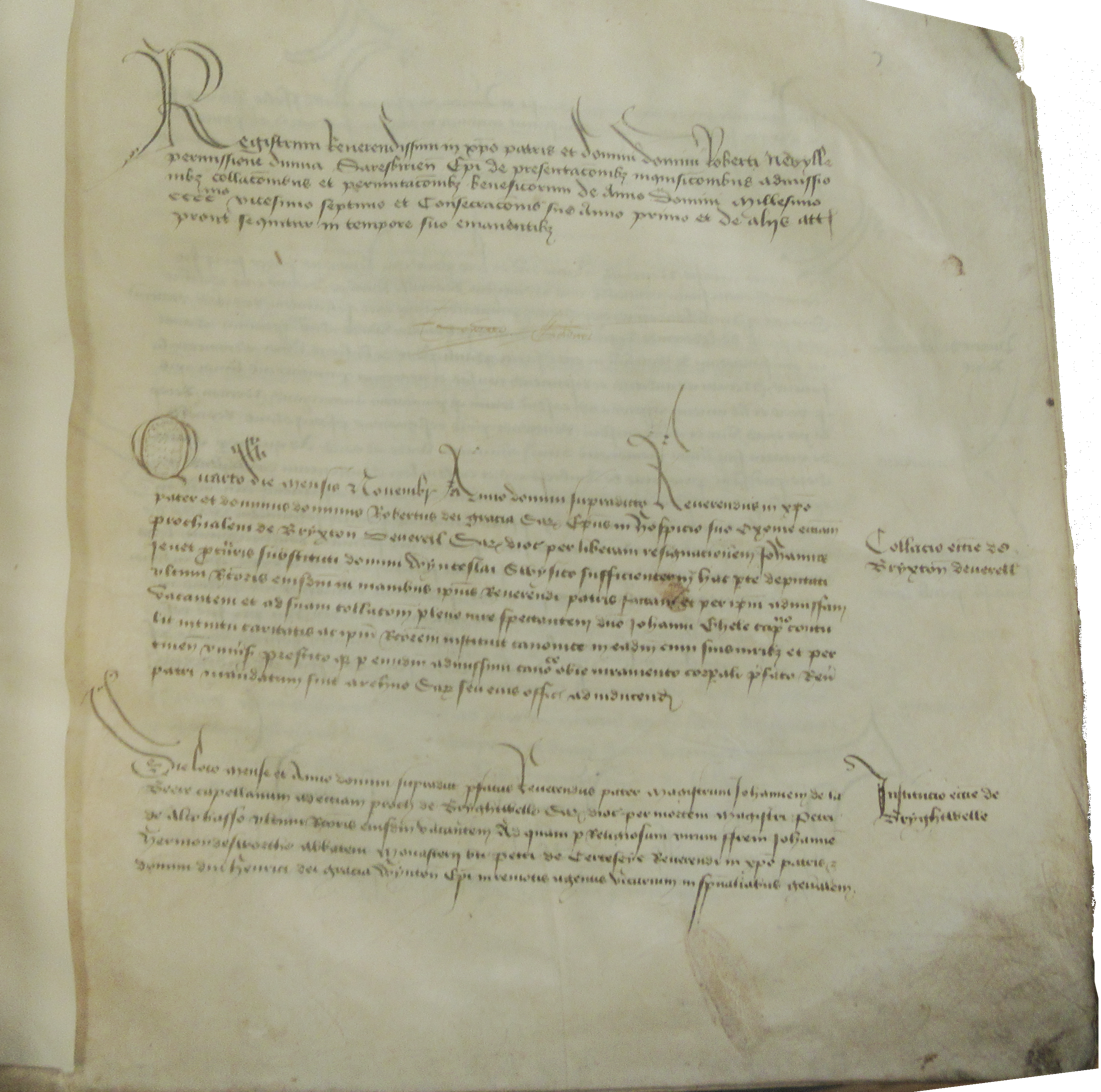
Opening page of the episcopal register of Robert Neville, Bishop of Salisbury 1427–1438, before his translation to the Diocese of Durham. The introductory section translates as Register of the most reverend [Registrum reverendissimi] Lord Christ the father, Lord Robert Nevylle, with divine permission Bishop [Eps] of Salisbury, presented and questioned and admitted to all documents and acts [in[stitucioni]bus collacionibus ... alise act[is]] in the year of our lord one thousand 400th [CCCCXXVII] and twenty seventh [vicesimo septimo] and consecrated his first year [suo Anno primo] receiving the temporalities following in the fullness of time [in tempore suo]

A bishop's (or archbishop's) (Note: An Archbishop is still also a diocesan, and so his registers are also a bishop's registers though augmented with more Papal and royal documents in his position as a metropolitan and Papal Legate. E. F. Jacob argued that the two archdioceses in England, therefore, contained slightly different material on account of their differing foundations. Canterbury had been a monastic foundation, while York's had been secular. The former, for example, had no prebends to be concerned with, while the latter was mostly concerned with the various chapters and collegiate churches.) register was a legal record of his correspondence and instructions to the outside world, and its legal position was that of a notarial record writ large. It was the bishop's main archive. Hill describes it as comprising three main elements: "as formulae, as records of things which had been done, and as records of things which had been acquired". But Hill also advises against treating it as a mere document of events, seeing it as "a record of the use of a bishop's authority, and as such it was his greatest safeguard if that authority was challenged".

The register was mostly composed as a book, often comprising several volumes, although in some instances they were recorded as roll, and handwritten by the Registrar, occasionally using both sides of the page. Ecclesiastical scholar Rosalind Hill suggests that the reason the book form became more popular among their creators was their increased tractability over a roll, which she describes as "most inconvenient". For example, in 1290, the Bishop of Lincoln's registrar, John de Scalleby, wrote himself an aide-memoire to the effect that, should he need to return to a specific item, it "must be sought in various places in the roll of 1288 about the middle of the roll." De Scallesby seem to have been an innovator, and introduced a form of index calendar, particularly for letters dimissory, dispensations, indulgences, and new installations. The cross-referencing was elaborate.

Registrars appear to have occasionally had a staff of scribes. They began being created in the late 13th century; until then, there appears to have been little written down regarding the bishop's activities. Matters investigated and recorded included his visitations to monasteries and abbeys under his jurisdiction, often reporting on their chapter meetings and how the rule was enforced, The discipline of monks, nuns and priests was recorded, as were ordination lists recalling an individual's progress through the ranks of the church, and as to the inhabitancy of the institution—on occasion, the admission of children was recorded. They also recorded elections in religious houses and, conversely, the quashing of elections when the bishop deemed it necessary, as well as staffing matters. This included complaints of the "dumping" of nuns into often already impoverished abbeys, that is, placing unwanted daughters into religion. Fines handed out by the bishop's court are recorded as are licenses dispensed, such as those to beg. The most powerful tool in a bishop's armoury was excommunication; such instances of its imposition are also recorded. The register also contained instructions received by the bishop. The Pope might send dispensations, the archbishop his own instructions, and communications with the King, and while some of these might merely need storing in a safe place, others required frequent reference made to them. Benefices were important to record accurately as they were not only legal documents but conveyed rights of patronage to the receiver.

At the time, it was common for monasteries to act as secure storage for wealthy local families, and these contracts were often recorded into the registers for a small fee, including original charters and the inspeximi. Diocesan protection was considered stronger than that of a parish church or other house, as these were occasionally broken into and robbed. Registers were also used by contemporaries who sought evidence of past events in their pages and bishops had ready access to the registers of their predecessors.

== Use by historians ==
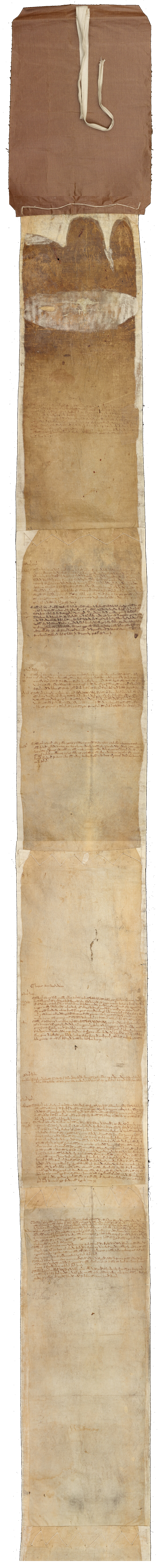
Walter de Grey's register as Archbishop of York was early enough in its creation to still be enrolled rather than bound; this is the first few membranes stitched together.

Historian Eileen Power has demonstrated that "much information about the conduct of abbesses and prioresses" can be garnered from the registers and particularly the leadership's attempts to control a house's superior "can be multiplied" from the register mentions. She also warns, however, that often only the formulaic pro forma was recorded in the registry itself and that individual cases and their specific evidence was omitted. However, they may, on occasion, record the responses of individuals in whatever their chosen language (so, for example, illustrating cases of literacy among laymen). They occasionally contain or mention material from other bishop's registers which is yet now lost. Hill notes that, albeit unknown to us today, there may have been more than one copy of a register written, and also notes their bulk: Bishop Sutton's, for example, spread over eight volumes and comprised around two million words. In the 13th century, William de Wickwane, Archbishop of York, caused his registers to be written in duplicate.

== Problems ==
Episcopal registers generally focussed on issues that were brought to diocesan attention as being problematic. As a result, they may not reflect an accurate picture of the state of religion in the area. Similarly to court records, they record the complaints but not the positives. They were often heavily condensed versions of what had taken place; for example, an ordination—a multi-layered procedure—might only be recorded with a single line. As a result they often record the result of a process rather than the details of how the result was reached. Therefore, says Robert Swanson, "much is committed and falls beneath their radar. All of the original paperwork has generally to be imagined."

A problem faced by historians using registers, suggests Hill, is that certain items were considered more important than others and so preserved more efficiently. Visitations, for example, were "of strictly temporary value" compared with the bishop's letters and instructions, which were, in turn, better preserved. Relatively few have survived, and those that do come mainly from England. There are very few Welsh registers extant, and none whatsoever from Scotland.

== Published episcopal registers ==
Arms	Arch/diocese	Title	Editor	Notes	Reference
	Bath and Wells	The Registers of Walter Giffard, Bishop of Bath and Wells, 1265–6, and of Henry Bowett, Bishop of Bath and Wells, 1401–1407	Thomas Scott Holmes	Somerset Record Society volume 13, 1899.	
	Bath and Wells	Calendar of the register of John de Drokensford, bishop of Bath and Wells, A.D. 1309–1329	Edmund Hobhouse	Somerset Record Society volume 1, 1887	
	Bath and Wells	The Register of Ralph of Shrewsbury, Bishop of Bath and Wells, 1329–1363	Thomas Scott Holmes	Somerset Record Society vols 9 & 10: 2 vols, 1896	
	Bath and Wells	The Register of Nicholas Bubwith, Bishop of Bath and Wells, 1407–1424	Thomas Scott Holmes	Somerset Record Society vols 29 & 30: 2 vols, 1914	
	Bath and Wells	The Register of John Stafford, Bishop of Bath and Wells, 1425–1443	Thomas Scott Holmes	Somerset Record Society vols 30 & 31	
	Bath and Wells	The Registers of Robert Stillington, Bishop of Bath and Wells, 1466–1491, and Richard Fox, Bishop of Bath and Wells, 1492–1494	Henry Maxwell Lyte	Somerset Record Society vol 52	
	Canterbury	The Canterbury Archiepiscopates of John Stafford (1443–52) and John Kemp (1452–54) with Editions of their Registers	David Blair Foss	King's College, University of London PhD thesis, 1986	
	Carlisle	The Episcopal Registers of Carlisle: The Register of Bishop John de Halton	W. N. Thompson	Cumberland and Westmorland Antiquarian and Archaeological Society/Canterbury and York Society, 1909	
	Chichester	The Episcopal register of Robert Rede, ordinis predicatorum, Lord Bishop of Chichester, 1397–1415	C. Deedes	Sussex Record Society volume 11, 1910	
	Coventry and Lichfield	The Episcopate of Walter Langton, Bishop of Coventry and Lichfield, 1296–1321: With a Calendar of his Register	Jill Blackwell Hughes	University of Nottingham PhD thesis: 3 volumes, 1992	
	Durham	The Register of Richard de Kellawe, Lord Palatine and Bishop of Durham, 1311–1316	Thomas Duffus Hardy	Cambridge University Press, 1878	
	Durham	Richard D'aungerville [Bishop of Durham], of Bury: Fragments of his Register, and other Documents	G. W. Kitchin	Surtees Society, volume 119, 1910	
	Exeter	The Registers of Walter Bronescombe (A.D. 1257–1291), and Peter Quivil (A.D. 1280–1291), Bishops of Exeter, with some Records of the Episcopate of Bishop Thomas de Bytton (A.D. 1292–1307)	F. C. Hingeston-Randolph	William Pollard, 1889	
	Exeter	The Register of Walter de Stapeldon, Bishop of Exeter, (A.D. 1307–1326)	F. C. Hingeston-Randolph	William Pollard, 1892	
	Exeter	The Register of John de Grandisson, Bishop of Exeter, (A.D. 1327–1369)	F. C. Hingeston-Randolph	William Pollard, 1894–1899, 3 volumes	
	Exeter	The Register of Thomas de Brantyngham, Bishop of Exeter (A.D. 1370–1394)	F. C. Hingeston-Randolph	William Pollard, 1901–1906, 2 volumes	
	Exeter	The Register of Edmund Stafford, Bishop of Exeter (A.D. 1395–1419): An Index and Abstract of its Contents	F. C. Hingeston-Randolph	William Pollard, 1886	
	Hereford	Registrum Thome de Cantilupo, Episcopi Herefordensis, A.D. 1275–1282	R. G. Griffiths	Canterbury and York series volume 2, 1907 (Latin)	
	Hereford	The Register of Adam de Orleton, Bishop of Hereford (A. D. 1317–1327)	A. T. Bannister	Cantilupe Society/Canterbury and York Society, 1907	
	Lincoln	Lincoln diocese documents, 1450–1544	Andrew Clark	Early English Text Society, original ser., volume 149, 1914. Also a database.	
	Lincoln	The Register of Adam de Orleton, Bishop of Hereford (A. D. 1317–1327)	A. T. Bannister	Cantilupe Society/Canterbury and York Society, 1907	
	Rochester	Registrum Roffense: Records relating to Rochester Cathedral	John Thorpe	W. & J. Richardson, 1769	
	St Davids	The Episcopal Registers of the Diocese of St. David's 1397 to 1518	R. F. Isaacson	Cymmrodorion Record Series, volume 6, 1917	
	Salisbury	Vetus Registrum Sarisberiense alias dictum Registrum S. Osmundi Episcopi: The Register of S. Osmund	W. H. Rich Jones	Rolls Series, volume 78, 1883	
	Winchester	Wykeham's Register: William of Wykeham, Bishop of Winchester, 1366-1404	T. F. Kirby	Lollard Society, 1899	
	Worcester	Worcester Diocese: Bishops' Registers	Mel Lockie	Worcestershire Historical Society, 2021: an online database of diocesan registers, 1275–1538, including the Sede vacante years	
	York	York's Archbishops Registers	Borthwick Institute for Archives	University of York, 2016: an ongoing online database of diocesan registers	
