= Surrey History Centre =

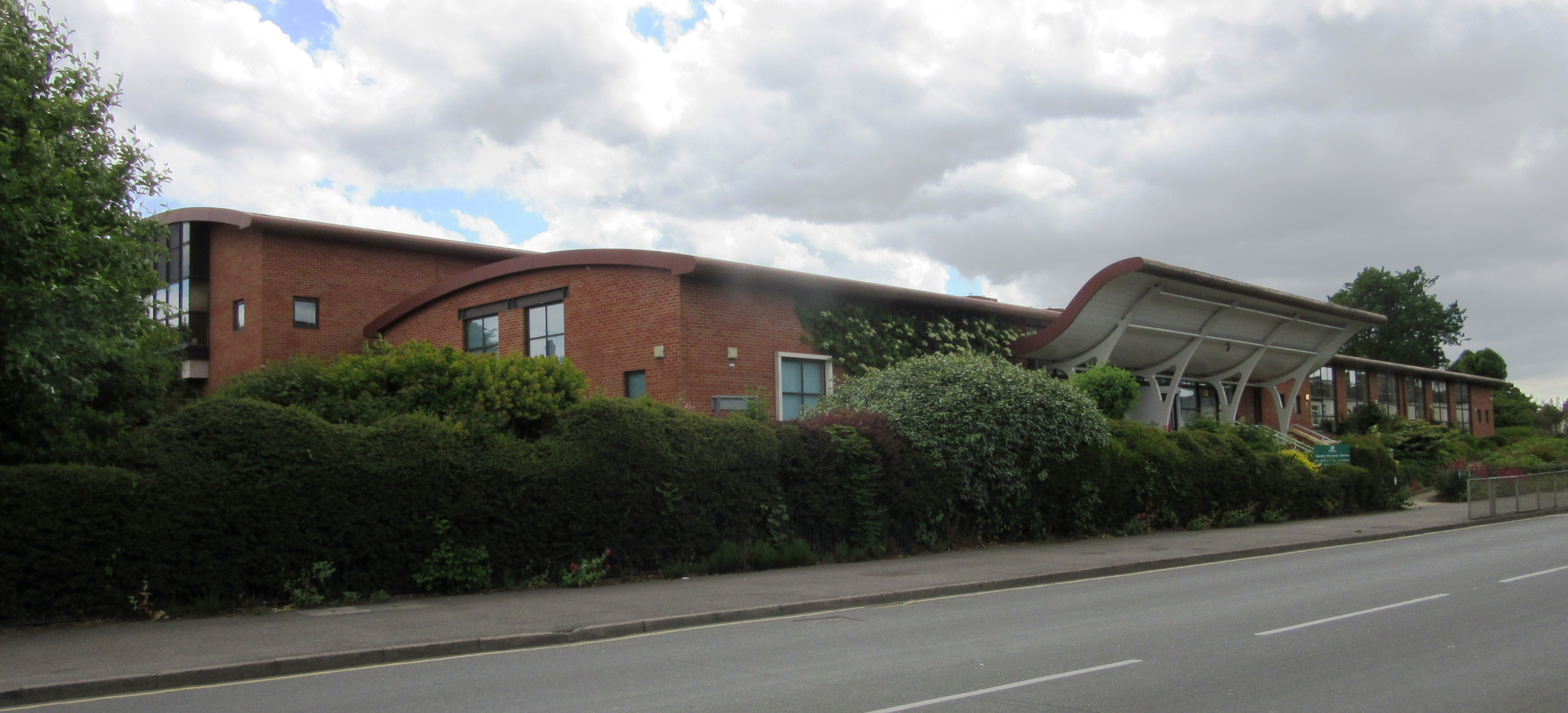
- 51.3169°N 0.5701°W
- Location: Woking, England
- Type: County record office
- Scope: Surrey
- Established: 31 March 1999
- Service area: Surrey

Other information
- Parent organization: Surrey County Council
- Website: www.surreycc.gov.uk/culture-and-leisure/history-centre

Surrey History Centre in Woking, Surrey, England, collects and rescues archives and printed materials relating to Surrey's past and present.

== Building and facilities ==
The present building was conceived in the mid-1990s, driven by the need, recognised by Surrey County Council since the late 1970s, to replace the former Surrey Record Office, then in Kingston upon Thames. The building concept was influenced by the West Sussex Record Office under construction at the time. The construction project was an early recipient of Heritage Lottery Fund funding, being awarded £2.75M in December 1995. This supplemented the provision of the site and £3.75M funding from Surrey County Council. The design was by W.S. Atkins and MJ Gleeson Group were the contractor. The centre was formally opened on 31 March 1999 by Prince Charles.

The new building brought together collections from the Surrey Record Office, the Guildford Muniment Room (a Grade II listed building in Guildford), and the Surrey Local Studies Library, formerly located in Guildford Library.

== Collections ==
Among the most notable collections are the official records of Surrey County Council since 1889; the historical records of the Mores and More-Molyneux of Loseley Park, near Guildford; the records of the many mental hospitals in the county; Philip Bradley's collection of fairground photographs; papers of Lewis Carroll and "Carrolliana"; the papers of the Labour politician and Home Secretary James Chuter Ede; manuscripts and papers of the author R. C. Sherriff; archives, plans and garden designs of Gertrude Jekyll; archives of the infantry regiments associated with the county, including the Queen's Royal Regiment (West Surrey), the East Surrey Regiment and the Queen's Royal Surrey Regiment; archives of Surrey clubs, societies and local organisations, including Surrey County Cricket Club and Epsom Grandstand Association; and the archives of major businesses such as Dennis Specialist Vehicles Ltd of Guildford.

The archives of John Broadwood & Sons and a large number of papers relating to members of the Broadwood family, including Lucy Broadwood the folk song collector, which are all housed at Surrey History Centre, were the subject of an extensive conservation programme, aided by Heritage Lottery Fund funding and completed in 2006.

Surrey History Centre holds an extensive collection of parish registers. Most of their Church of England parish registers, from 1538 to 1987 (baptisms to 1912; marriages to 1937; and burials to 1987) are now available via ancestry.co.uk. The online Guide to parish registers held at Surrey History Centre indicates that significant numbers of the registers for parishes historically in Surrey but now in London are held by London Metropolitan Archives.

== See also ==
- Surrey Archaeological Society
- Surrey Historic Buildings Trust
- Surrey Record Society
- Media related to Surrey History Centre at Wikimedia Commons

== Sources ==
- Documents in the Surrey Record Office: an exhibition of documents and repair. Guildford: Surrey Record Society. 1961.
- Hand list of deposited muniments (special collections) in the County Record Office, Kingston upon Thames: Surrey County Record Office, 1949
- Roe, Sonia, ed. (2006). Oil paintings in public ownership in Surrey. London: Public Catalogue Foundation. ISBN 9781904931256.
- Jenkins, Deborah (1977). Parish records : a brief introduction. Kingston upon Thames: Surrey Record Office.(reissued 1981)
- Surrey musters (taken from the Loseley MSS). Vol. 4 vols. London: Surrey Record Society. 1914–1919.
