= Gordon Donaldson =

Scottish historian

Professor Gordon Donaldson CBE FRHistS FBA FRSE
- Donaldson posing in his library

Historiographer to HM the Queen in Scotland
- In office 1979–1993

Sir William Fraser Professor of Scottish History and Palaeography, University of Edinburgh
- In office 1963–1979

Personal details
- Born: 13 April 1913 Edinburgh, Scotland
- Died: 16 March 1993 (aged 79) Windygates, Fife, Scotland
- Occupation: Historian

Gordon Donaldson (13 April 1913 – 16 March 1993) was a leading Scottish historian.

== Life ==
Born in a tenement at 140 McDonald Road off Leith Walk in northern Edinburgh on 13 April 1913, Gordon Donaldson was the son of Rachel Swan and Magnus Donaldson.

Donaldson was of Shetland descent. He attended Broughton Elementary School (adjacent to his home) and then the Royal High School of Edinburgh (1921–31), before being awarded a scholarship to study at the University of Edinburgh. There he was influenced by the lectures of Robert Kerr Hannay. He also supplemented his income by tutoring.

After graduating in 1935 with a first-class Honours Degree in History (MA), Donaldson gained his PhD in 1938 at the Institute of Historical Research in London, where he also won the David Berry Prize from the Royal Historical Society. Donaldson also has a DLitt degree.

After working as an archivist at the General Register Office for Scotland 1938–1947, he was appointed to a lectureship in Scottish history at the University of Edinburgh, largely through the offices of William Croft Dickinson. This marked the beginning of Donaldson's thirty-two-year academic career at the university.

He served as a Reader from 1955, before succeeding Dickinson as Sir William Fraser Professor of Scottish History and Palaeography in 1963, which he held until his retirement in 1979. During his academic career, Professor Donaldson wrote or co-wrote over thirty books, and numerous articles and addresses. He also served at various times as president of the Scottish Ecclesiological Society, the Scottish Church History Society, the Scottish History Society, the Scottish Record Society, the Scottish Records Association, and the Stair Society.

In 1978 he was elected a Fellow of the Royal Society of Edinburgh. His proposers were Norman Gash, Geoffrey Barrow, Sir Fraser Noble, and John Cameron, Lord Cameron.

He was also an honorary vice-president of the Royal Historical Society, and in 1992 he received the St Olav's Medal from the king of Norway. When Professor Donaldson retired, he was appointed Historiographer Royal in Scotland.

He could talk about any character in Scottish history as if he knew them personally. It was his love of the sea and ships, born from his childhood in Shetland, that took him to Dysart in Fife in his retirement, where he lived in a seventeenth-century Pan Ha' apartment. "I cannot pass my old age without the sight of the sea and ships," he said.

He died in Cameron Hospital, Windygates in Fife on 16 March 1993. He never married and left no family.

== Bibliography ==
- (with James Kirk) Scotland's history : approaches and reflections, 1995
- A Northern Commonwealth: Scotland and Norway, 1990
- The faith of the Scots, 1990
- (with David John Breeze) A queen's progress : an introduction to the buildings associated with Mary Queen of Scots in the care of the Secretary of State for Scotland, 1987
- Scottish church history, 1985
- All the Queen's men : power and politics in Mary Stewart's Scotland, 1983
- Four centuries : Edinburgh University life, 1583–1983, 1983
- (with Ann Morton) British National Archives and the local historian : a guide to official record publications, 1980
- (with Robert Morpeth) A dictionary of Scottish history, 1977
- Scotland : the shaping of a nation, 1974
- Mary, Queen of Scots, 1974
- (with Robert Morpeth) Who's who in Scottish history, 1973
- Scottish historical documents, 1970
- The first trial of Mary, Queen of Scots, 1969
- The memoirs of Sir James Melville of Halhill...., 1969
- Scottish Kings, 1967
- The Scots overseas, 1966
- General Editor, The Edinburgh History of Scotland, 1965
  - Vol I, Scotland: The making of the Kingdom, A.A.M. Duncan
  - Vol II, Scotland: The Later Middle Ages, R. Nicholson
  - Vol III, Scotland: James V to James VII, G. Donaldson
  - Vol IV, Scotland: 1689 to the Present, W Ferguson
- Scotland: James V to James VII, 1965
- Scotland: church and nation through sixteen centuries, 1960
- The Scottish Reformation, 1960
- Shetland Life under Earl Patrick, 1958
- Common errors in Scottish history, 1956
- The Making of the Scottish Prayer Book of 1637. Edinburgh: Edinburgh University Press. 1954.
- The Court Book of Shetland 1602–1604, 1954
- Accounts of the collectors of thirds of benefices, 1561–1572, 1949
- (with John Lauder, C Macrae) St. Andrews formulare, 1514–1546, 1944
