= British Record Society =

British learned society

The British Record Society is a British learned society that focuses on publishing historic records, or, more specifically, indexes to such records. In recent years, the Society has concentrated on the publication of name indexes to English probate records, and the texts of 17th-century Hearth Tax returns.

== Foundation and early history ==
The Society was founded in 1889 to take over the Index Library, which had begun life the previous year as W. P. W. Phillimore's private scheme for the publication of indexes to British public records, now the brief of the List and Index Society. The Society was also always interested in record conservation, and to act as what would now be called a pressure group for archives and their users, pushing for the creation of county record offices and county record societies. The inception of an official series of Lists and Indexes in 1892 reduced the need for private publication of indexes to records in the Public Record Office. The Society consequently turned its attention to records held in other repositories.

In 1898 the Society’s Scottish section became the totally independent Scottish Record Society. In 1933 the Society's Record Preservation Section was similarly taken over by the newly founded British Records Association (B.R.A.).

== Activities ==
Since the 1930s, the British Record Society has been primarily a publishing society for English records, frequently in conjunction with county historical societies. By 2012, 126 volumes of the Index Library had been published over 123 years, besides two extra volumes and some microfiche. Over the past half century the Society has largely, but not exclusively, concentrated on the publication of name indexes to probate records, and the texts of Hearth Tax returns from the 1660s and 1670s.

A longer history of the Society and its current activities will be found on its website.

A complete list of its publications up to 1982 will be found in E. L. C. Mullins, Texts and Calendars, I and II, Royal Historical Society, 1958 and 1983. Details of those published after 1982 can be found on the Royal Historical Society's website.

== See also ==
- List of historical societies

== Bibliography ==
- Martin, G. H.; Spufford, Peter, eds. (1990). The Records of the Nation: The Public Record Office 1838–1988: The British Record Society 1888–1988. Woodbridge UK/Rochester US: Boydell. ISBN 0851155383.
- Spufford, Peter (1976). "Marc Fitch and the British Record Society". In Emmison, F. G.; Stephens, Roy (eds.). Tribute to an Antiquary: essays presented to Marc Fitch by some of his friends. London: Leopard's Head Press. pp. 9–19. ISBN 0904920003.
