= William Phillimore Watts Phillimore =

British solicitor and genealogist (1853–1913)

- Born: 27 October 1853; Nottingham, U.K.
- Died: 9 April 1913 (aged 59); Torquay, U.K.
- Education: The Queen's College, Oxford
- Occupation: Solicitor
- Spouse: Jane Graham
- Children: 1 son
- Parent(s): William Phillimore Phillimore; Mary Elizabeth Watts

William Phillimore Watts Phillimore (formerly Stiff) MA BCL (27 October 1853 – 9 April 1913) was an English solicitor, genealogist and publisher.

== Early life ==
William Phillimore Watts Stiff was born on 27 October 1853 in Nottingham, the eldest son of Dr William Phillimore Stiff M.B. Lond., M.R.C.S. Eng., of Sneinton, Nottingham, afterwards superintendent of Nottingham General Lunatic Asylum, and Mary Elizabeth, daughter of Benjamin Watts of Bridgen Hall, Bridgnorth, Shropshire. In 1873 William Stiff senior changed the family surname by royal licence to Phillimore, his great-grandmother's maiden name. William junior studied at The Queen's College, Oxford, and was awarded a second-class degree in Jurisprudence in 1876.

== Career ==
Phillimore was a solicitor. In 1897 he founded the publishing business which bears his name. From 1888 onwards, he advocated the formation of local record offices, and to that end prepared bills to be put before Parliament.

Phillimore initiated the foundation of several record publication societies: the Index Library (afterwards the germ of the British Record Society) in 1887; the Scottish Record Series (afterwards Scottish Record Society) in 1896; the Thoroton Society of Nottinghamshire in 1897; the Canterbury and York Society in 1904, publishers of English medieval ecclesiastical records; and the Irish Record Society in 1909. He was a corresponding member of the New England Historic Genealogical Society, the Virginia Historical Society, and the Chicago Historical Society.

== Personal life and death ==
Phillimore married Jane Graham in 1887 and they left one surviving son, Wilfred Henderson Phillimore.

Phillimore died on 9 April 1913 in Torquay, Devon.

== Legacy ==
The publishing house he founded, Phillimore & Co., later based in Chichester, West Sussex, became a prominent publisher in the fields of local history and family history, and survives as an imprint of The History Press.

== Works ==
=== Authored by Phillimore ===
- Nottinghamshire Church Bells (1872)
- Memorials of the family of Fynmore: with notes on the origin of Fynmore, Finnimore, Phillimore, Fillmore, Filmer, etc., and particulars of some of those surnames from the year 1208, to the present time (1886)
- How to Write the History of a Family (1887)
- Pedigree Work (1900)
- The Family of Middlemore (1901)
- The Family of Holbrow (1901)
- Heralds' College and Coats of Arms regarded from a Legal Aspect (1904)
- Law and Practice of Grant of Arms (1905)
- Changes of Name (1906)
- The Family of Phillimore (completed by Lord Phillimore, and published in 1922).

=== Edited by Phillimore ===
- 1297 Coram Rege Roll
- Rotuli Hugonis de Welles, episcopi Lincolniensis 1209-1235
- Irish Will Calendars
- County Pedigrees: Nottinghamshire
- upwards of 200 volumes of Parish Registers, Inquisitions, Will Calendars (chronological lists of wills) etc.
- Gloucestershire Notes and Queries

== Sources ==
- Tiller, Kate (2004). "Phillimore [formerly Stiff], William Phillimore Watts (1853–1913)". Oxford Dictionary of National Biography (online ed.). Oxford University Press. doi:10.1093/ref:odnb/57556. (Subscription, Wikipedia Library access or UK public library membership required.)
- Who Was Who, 1897–1916 A & C Black Ltd, 1920
- The Genealogist, vol. 30 (October 1913)
