= Heritage Perth =

Heritage organisation in Perth, Western Australia

Heritage Perth was an organisation that dealt with cultural and architectural heritage in Perth, the capital city of Western Australia.

The organisation was supported by the City of Perth, and was independent of other Western Australian heritage organisations such as the Heritage Council of Western Australia and the National Trust of Western Australia.

Earlier efforts by the City of Perth to work on heritage within its area were hampered by lack of supporting government legislation in relation to heritage conservation, and lack of understanding of the importance of heritage and cultural tourism. In recent times a more sophisticated understanding has evolved, culminating in the annual Heritage Council Heritage Awards and council awareness of the issues.

Earlier in the history of the City of Perth activities of promoting the history of Perth were conducted by a range of organisations in Western Australia, however Heritage Perth is now the main body dealing specifically with the history of Perth.

It conducted the annual Perth Heritage Days, which had run since 2009, as well as producing newsletters and web based information about places and people of Perth's history.

In 2018, the City of Perth, under commissioners, defunded the operation of the organisation.

== See also ==
- List of historical societies § Western Australia
