= Scottish History Society =

- Abbreviation: SHS
- Formation: 1886; 139 years ago
- Founder: Earl of Rosebery
- Registration no.: SC005043
- Legal status: Charity
- Location: Scotland
- President: Dr Catriona MacDonald
- Website: scottishhistorysociety.com

The Scottish History Society is a historical and text publication society, which promotes the study of and research in the history of Scotland.

It was founded in 1886, as part of the late 19th-century revival in interest in Scottish national identity. The Society was founded as a result of a letter from the Earl of Rosebery (later to serve as Prime Minister, from 1894–95), published in The Scotsman on 3 February 1886, and Rosebery became the first President of the Society.

The first president of the Society defined its work as "the humble and unobtrusive task of letting everyman know, in so far as in us lies, and so far as documentary evidence exists, how our forebears lived and worked and carried on the business of their country in their separate spheres."

The Society has a council of scholars representing most of the universities in Scotland and some beyond, as well as other institutions.

== Purpose and history ==
The Scottish History Society's objects are to promote interest in, and further knowledge of, the history of Scotland by means of discovery and publication of documents illustrative of that history.

The first publications, in October 1887, were Bishop Pococke's Tours in Scotland, 1747-1760, edited by D W Kemp, and the Diary of and General Expenditure Book of William Cunningham of Craigends, 1673–1680, edited by the Reverend James Dodds, D.D.

By 1900, 65 Public Libraries subscribed for the society's publications. Amongst some of its notable members have been Sir James Balfour Paul, Lord Lyon King of Arms, and Emeritus Professor David Masson, Historiographer Royal for Scotland.

Since its foundation the SHS has produced an increasing number of vital records hitherto unavailable to scholars of Scottish history, and in this the SHS have provided an invaluable service to the nation.

The current series of SHS publications is the 6th Series, published by Boydell & Brewer.

== President ==
In 1900, the President was the Earl of Rosebery. In 1970, the President was Professor Gordon Donaldson. Other Presidents have included the novelist and politician John Buchan, 1st Baron Tweedsmuir, Dr Jenny Wormald, and Professor Roger Mason of the University of St Andrews. Information on the Society's current office bearers may be found on the official website.

== Digitised editions at the National Library of Scotland ==
Many of the society editions (up to 2013) have been digitised and are freely available to view on the website of the National Library of Scotland.

- Scottish History Society publications at the National Library of Scotland

== See also ==
- Scottish Record Society
- Society of Antiquaries of Scotland
- List of historical societies

== Bibliography ==
- Dickson, W. K. (1936). Scottish History Society: Fifty years, 1886-1936. Scottish History Society.
- Tindley, Annie (2015). "The Scottish History Society: 130 Years of Promoting the Best in Scottish History Scholarship" (PDF). Scottish Archives. 21: 8–17.
