= Hertfordshire Record Society =

Flag of Hertfordshire

The Hertfordshire Record Society is a text publication society for the county of Hertfordshire in England. It was founded in 1985 based on an idea by Lionel Munby for the purpose of publishing "texts relating to Hertfordshire that would not otherwise be easily accessible." The society is a registered charity.

== Publications ==
The society publishes an annual volume as well as ad-hoc publications such as historic maps. The first volume, Anthony Palmer's Tudor Churchwardens' Accounts, collated the records of six Hertfordshire parishes for the first time to provide a primary source for church administration during the Reformation. The second volume, edited by Lionel Munby, compared and contrasted the household records of William, 2nd earl of Salisbury and Edward Radcliffe, 6th earl of Sussex, in the 17th-century.

=== Maps ===
- Bryant's Map of Hertfordshire (1822)
- Topographical Map of Hartfordshire (1766) by Dury and Andrews
- Barnet Enclosure Award Maps and Schedule (1818)

=== Main series ===
==== 1980s ====
- Vol. I: Tudor Churchwardens' Accounts. Edited and with an Introduction by Anthony Palmer.
- Vol. II: Early Stuart Household Accounts. Edited and with an Introduction by Lionel Munby.
- Vol. III: A Professional Hertfordshire Tramp. Edited and with an Introduction by Audrey Deacon and Peter Walne.
- Vol. IV: The Salisbury-Balfour Correspondence. Introduction by Hugh Cecil. Edited by Robin Harcourt Williams.
- Vol. V: The Parish Register and Tithing Book of Thomas Hassall of Amwell. Edited and with an Introduction by Stephen Doree

==== 1990s ====
- Vol. VI: Cheshunt College: The Early Years. Edited and with an Introduction by Edwin Welch.
- Vol. VII: St Albans Quarter Sessions Rolls 1784-1820. Edited and with an Introduction by David Dean.
- Vol. VIII: The Accounts of Thomas Green 1742-1790. Edited and with an Introduction by Gillian Sheldrick
- Vol. IX: St Albans Wills 1471-1500. Edited and with an Introduction by Susan Flood.
- Vol. X: The Early Churchwardens' Accounts of Bishops Stortford 1431-1558. Edited and with an Introduction by Stephen Doree.
- Vol. XI: Religion in Hertfordshire 1847-51. Edited and with an Introduction by Judith Burg.
- Vol. XII: Muster Books 1580-1605. Edited and with an Introduction by Ann King.
- Vol. XIII: Hertford Wills and Inventories 1660-1725. Edited and with an Introduction by Beverly Adams.
- Vol. XIV: Lay Subsidy Rolls for Hertfordshire 1307-8 & 1334. Edited by Janice Brooker and Susan Flood: with an Introduction by Mark Bailey.
- Vol. XV: "Observations of Weather": 1684-89. Edited and with an Introduction by John Stevenson and Margaret Harcourt Williams.

==== 2000s ====
- Vol. XVI: Survey of the Royal Manor of Hitchin: 1676. Edited and with an Introduction by Bridget Howlett.
- Vol. XVII: Garden-Making and the Freman Family: A Memoir of Hamels 1713-1733. Edited and with an Introduction by Anne Rowe
- Vol. XVIII: Two Nineteenth Century Hertfordshire Diaries. Edited and with Introductions by Susan Flood: Judith Knight and Frank Kilvington
- Vol. XIX: "This Little Commonwealth": 1607-1650 & 1704-1747. Edited and with Introductions by Heather Falvey and Steve Hindle
- Vol. XX: Julian Grenfell: soldier and poet: letters and diaries: 1910-1915. Edited and with an Introduction by Kate Thompson
- Vol. XXI: The Hellard Almshouses and other Stevenage Charities: 1482-2005. Edited and with an Introduction by Margaret Ashby; preface by Evelyn Lord.
- Vol. XXII: The Diary of Lady Adela Capel of Cassiobury: 1841-1842. Edited and with an Introduction by Marian Strachan
- Vol. XXIII: The Impact of the First Civil War on Hertfordshire: 1642-47. Edited and with an Introduction by Alan Thomson

==== 2010s ====
- Vol. XXIV: The Diary of Benjamin Woodcock: 1836–1838. Edited and with an Introduction by Gillian Gear
- Vol. XXV: Datchworth Tithe Accounts: 1711 to 1747. Edited and with an Introduction by Jane Walker
- Vol. XXVI: John Carrington: farmer of Bramfield: his diary: 1798-1810: part I: 1798-1804. Edited and with an Introduction by Sue Flood
- Vol. XXVII: Humphry Repton's Red Books of Panshanger and Tewin Water. Introduction by Twigs Way
- Vol. XXVIII, The Receipt Book of Baroness Elizabeth Dimsdale (c.1800). Edited and with an Introduction by Heather Falvey
- Vol. XXIX, Records Of The Manor Of Norton In The Liberty of St Albans 1244-1539. Translated by Peter Foden, with an Introduction by the Norton Community Archaeology Group
- Vol. XXX, Weston School Logbooks, 1876-1914. Edited by Margaret Ashby
- Vol. XXXI, Lord Fordwich's Grand Tour, 1756-60. Translated and edited by Sheila White and Philip Sheail

== See also ==
- Hertfordshire Archives and Local Studies
