= Derbyshire Record Society =

Printing House

Flag of Derbyshire

The Derbyshire Record Society is a text publication society for the county of Derbyshire in England. It was established in 1977.

== Selected publications ==
- The Bailiffs of Derby: Urban Governors and their Governance 1513-1638
- The Building of Hardwick Hall. Part 2: The New Hall, 1591-98
- A Catalogue of Local Maps of Derbyshire c.1528-1800
- A Catalogue of the Library of Titus Wheatcroft of Ashover
- Chesterfield Parish Register 1558-1600
- Chesterfield Parish Register 1601-1635
- The Churchwardens Audit and Vestry Order Book of All Saints, Derby, 1465-1689
- A Derbyshire Armory
- The Derbyshire Church Notes of Sir Stephen Glynne 1825-1873
- Derbyshire Directories 1781-1824
- Derbyshire Feet of Fines 1323-1546
- The Derbyshire Gentry in the Fifteenth Century
- The Derbyshire Papist Returns of 1705-6
- Derbyshire Pedigrees An Index to the holdings of Derby Local Studies Library
- The Derbyshire Returns to the 1851 Religious Census
- Derbyshire Tithe Files 1836-50
- Derbyshire Wills proved in the Prerogative Court of Canterbury 1393-1574
- Derbyshire Wills proved in the Prerogative Court of Canterbury 1575-1601
- The Diary of Joseph Jenkinson of Dronfield, 1833-43
- An Early Muniment Register from Hardwick Hall
- Essays in Derbyshire History presented to Gladwyn Turbutt
- George Sitwell's Letterbook 1662-66
- A Glossary of Household, Farming and Trade Terms from Probate Inventories

== See also ==
- Derbyshire Record Office
