= Dugdale Society =

Scholarly publisher in Warwickshire, England

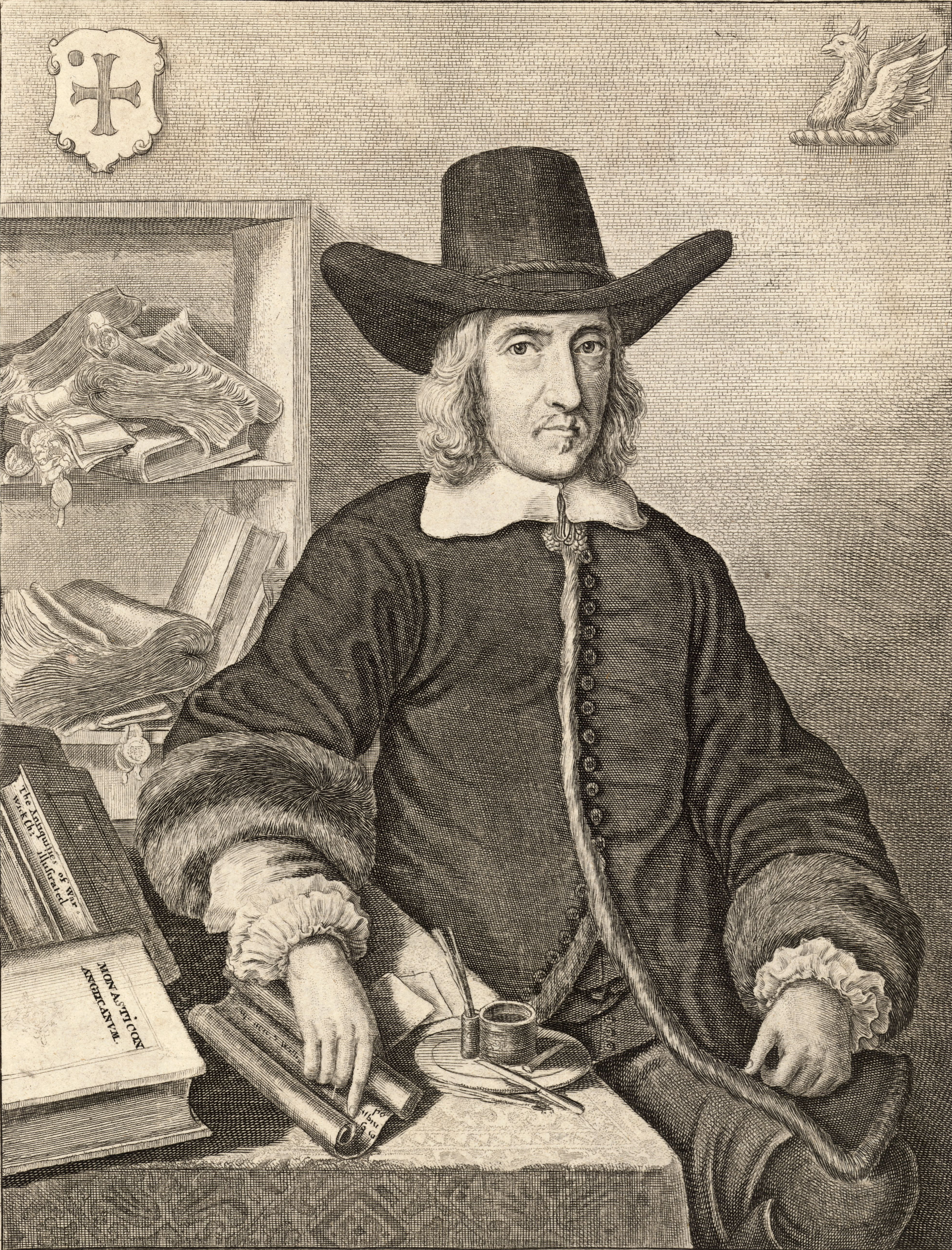
Sir William Dugdale of Blyth Hall in 1656: an etching by Wenceslaus Hollar

The Dugdale Society is a text publication society for the English county of Warwickshire. It was established in 1920 and named after the distinguished Warwickshire antiquarian Sir William Dugdale.

== Selected publications ==
=== Main series ===
Vol. Title

- I. Minutes and Accounts of the Corporation of Stratford-upon-Avon, Vol I, 1553–1565. 1921
- II. Abstract of the Bailiffs' Accounts of Monastic and Other Estates in the County of Warwick for the Year ending at Michaelmas 1547. 1923.
- III. Minutes and Accounts of the Corporation of Stratford-upon-Avon, Vol II, 1566–1577. 1924
- IV. Records of King Edward's School, Birmingham. Vol I. The 'Miscellany' Volume. 1924
- V. Minutes and Accounts of the Corporation of Stratford-upon-Avon, Vol III, 1577–1586. 1926
- VI. The Lay Subsidy Roll for Warwickshire of Edward III. 1928.
- VII. Records of King Edward's School, Birmingham. Vol. II. 1928.
- VIII. The Registers of Edgbaston Parish Church. Vol I. 1636–1812. 1928.
- IX. The Registers of Walter Reynolds, Bishop of Worcester. 1928.
- X. Minutes and Accounts of the Corporation of Stratford-upon-Avon, Vol IV, 1929.
- XI. Warwickshire Feet of Fines, Vol I. 1932.
- XII. Records of King Edward's School, Birmingham. Vol. III. 1933.
- XIII. Register of the Guild of the Holy Trinity, St Mary, St John the Baptist, and St Katherine of Coventry. Vol. I. 1935.
- XIV. The Registers of Edgbaston Parish Church. Vol II. 1636–1812. 1928.
- XV. Warwickshire Feet of Fines, Vol II. 1932.
- XVI. Rolls of the Warwickshire and Coventry Sessions of the Peace, 1377–1397. 1939.
- XVII. The Statute Merchant Roll of Coventry, 1392–1416. 1939.
- XVIII. Warwickshire Feet of Fines, Vol III. 1943.
- XIX. Register of the Guild of the Holy Trinity, St Mary, St John the Baptist, and St Katherine of Coventry. Vol. II. 1944.
- XX. Records of King Edward's School, Birmingham. Vol. IV. 1948.
- XXI. Ministers' Accounts of the Warwickshire Estates of the Duke of Clarence. 1952.
- XXII. Ecclesiastical Terriers of Warwickshire Parishes. Vol I. 1956.
- XXIII. Correspondence of the Rev. Joseph Greene, 1712–1790. 1965.
- XXIV. The Stoneleigh Leger Book. 1960.
- XXV. Records of King Edward's School, Birmingham. Vol. V. 1963.
- XXVI. Ministers' Accounts of the Collegiate Church of St Mary, Warwick, 1432–1485. 1969
- XXVII. Ecclesiastical Terriers of Warwickshire Parishes. Vol II. 1971.
- XXVIII. Warwickshire Printers' Notices. 1970.
- XXIX. Warwickshire Apprentices and their Masters, 1710–1760. 1975.
- XXX. Records of King Edward's School, Birmingham. Vol. VI. A Supplementary Miscellany. 1974.
- XXXI. Miscellany I. 1977.
- XXXII. The Langley Cartulary. 1980.
- XXXIII. Coventry Apprentices and their Masters, 1781–1806. 1983.
- XXXIV. Coventry Constables' Presentments, 1629–1742. 1986.
- XXXV. Minutes and Accounts of the Corporation of Stratford-upon-Avon. Vol. V. 1593–1598. 1990.
- XXXVI. The Great Fire of Warwick, 1694. 1992.
- XXXVII. The Correspondence of Sir Roger Newdigate of Arbury. 1995.
- XXXVIII. Coventry and its People in the 1520s. 1999.
- XXXIX Stratford-upon-Avon Inventories. Vol.I., 1538–1625. 2002
- XL. Stratford-upon-Avon Inventories. Vol.II., 1626–1699. 2003
- XLI. The Diaries of Sanderson Miller of Radway. 2005 ISBN 9780852200841
- XLII. The Register of the Guild of the Holy Cross, St Mary and St John the Baptist, Stratford-upon-Avon (2007) ISBN 9780852200889
- XLIII. The Warwickshire Hearth Tax Returns (2010) ISBN 9780852200919
- XLIV. Robert Bearman, The Minutes and Accounts of the Corporation of Stratford-upon-Avon and other records, Volume VI, 1599–1609 with index to Volumes 1–6 (2011) ISBN 9780852200940
- XLV. The Household Account Book of Sir Thomas Puckering of Warwick, 1620. 2012 ISBN 9780852200933
- XLVI. Coventry Priory Register. 2013 ISBN 9780852200964
- XLVII. The 1851 Census of Religious Worship: Warwickshire. 2014 ISBN 9780852200971
- XLVIII. The Newburgh Earldom of Warwick and its Charters 1088–1253. 2015 ISBN 9780852200995
- XLIX. Birmingham Wills and Inventories 1512–1603. 2016 ISBN 9780852201015
- L. Records of the Warwick District Appeal Tribunal 1916–18 ISBN 9780852201039
- LI. The Early Records of Coleshill c.1120-1549 (2018) ISBN 9780852201046
- LII. (Stephanie Appleton and Mairi Macdonald, editors), Stratford-upon-Avon Wills, 1348-1647 (2020)
- LIII. (Stephanie Appleton and Mairi Macdonald, editors), Stratford-upon-Avon Wills, 1648-1701 (2020)

== See also ==
- Warwickshire County Record Office
