= Worcestershire Historical Society =

Flag of Worcestershire

The Worcestershire Historical Society is an historical society and text publication society for the county of Worcestershire in England. It was founded in 1893.

== Selected publications ==
- Court Rolls of Romsley, 1279-1643, Matthew Tompkins, New series 27, 2017.
- The Autobiography and Library of Thomas Hall, B.D. (1610-1665), Denise Thomas, New series 26, 2015
- The Diary and Papers of Henry Townshend, 1640-1663, Stephen Porter, Stephen K. Roberts and Ian Roy, New series 25, 2014.
- Register of Simon de Montacute, Bishop of Worcester, 1334-1337, Editor: Roy Haines, New series 15, 1996.
- Worcestershire Taxes in the 1520s. The Military Survey and Forced Loans of 1522-3 and the Lay Subsidy of 1524-7, Editor: Michael Faraday, New series 19, 2003.
- Court Rolls of Elmley Castle, Worcestershire, 1347-1564, Editor: Robert K. Field, New series 20, 2004.
- Records of Feckenham Forest, Worcestershire, c. 1236-1377, Editor: Jean Birrell, New series 21, 2006.
- The Worcestershire Eyre of 1275, Jens Röhrkasten, New series, 22, 2008.
- Tithe Apportionments of Worcestershire, 1837-1851, Peter L. Walker, New series 23, 2011.
- Noble Household Management and Spiritual Discipline in Fifteenth-Century Worcestershire, James P. Toomey, Robert N. Swanson and David Guya, New series 24, 2013.
