= Rymour Club =

The Rymour Club was founded at a meeting in Elder’s Hotel, Edinburgh on 8 May 1903. Over the next thirty years they would also meet at Mowbury House and the Outlook Tower, but their best known association is with John Knox’s House in the High Street (now the Scottish Storytelling Centre) and the Club‘s librarian, William J Hay – who was the curator for the House for over forty years – published several volumes of their Miscellanea and Transactions from there between 1906 and 1928.

The object of the club was to collect, preserve and study traditional Scottish folk song, rhymes and popular lore. They took their name from Thomas Rymour, or Thomas the Rhymer, or Thomas of Erceldoune – the thirteenth-century Scottish seer who was reputed captured by the Queen of Elfland. This tale is related in the well-known Child ballad Thomas the Rhymer (Child 37).

A history of Thomas Rymour by John Geddie – the journalist and ballad scholar – was written for and published by the Club and he also features in the frontispiece for the Club’s publications drawn by William Home, the first president of the Club and a noted artist, best known for his Old Houses in Edinburgh.

The club’s members included noted folk song scholars such as Robert Ford, John Fairlie and Alexander Keith and, most notably, Gavin Greig and the Reverend J B Duncan who, together, amassed the largest volume of folk songs ever collected in Scotland (from Aberdeenshire and the North-East). George Gardiner, born in Perthshire, but best known for his collection of songs from Hampshire was also a member, as were writers such as David Rorie, W S Crockett, and Lauchlan MacLean Watt, the bookseller James Hay Thin, and the popular entertainer Sir Harry Lauder, who became the first lifetime member, at the cost of five pounds.

== Sources ==
- Rymour Club, Miscellanea: 1906–1911, published by William J Hay, John Knox’s House, Edinburgh, 1911.
- Rymour Club, Miscellanea: 1912–1919, published by William J Hay, John Knox’s House, Edinburgh, 1919.
- Rymour Club, Transactions: 1920–1928: published from the Outlook Tower, 1928
