= Geoffrey Martin (historian) =

Geoffrey Martin CBE FRHistS
- Born: Geoffrey Haward Martin; 27 September 1928
- Died: 20 December 2007 (aged 79)
- Occupations: Historian and archivist
- Title: Keeper of Public Records
- Term: 1982–1988
- Spouse: Janet Douglas Hamer (m. 1953)

Academic background
- Education: Colchester Royal Grammar School
- Alma mater: Merton College, Oxford

Geoffrey Haward Martin CBE FRHistS (27 September 1928 – 20 December 2007) was a British academic, historian, and from 1982 to 1988 Keeper of Public Records of the UK.

== Early life ==
Geoffrey Haward Martin was born in Essex on 27 September 1928. He was educated at Colchester Royal Grammar School, where he published a history of the school in the school magazine, The Colcestrian, before reprinting it as a separate volume with additions and corrections, The History of Colchester Royal Grammar School (1539–1947), published by the Borough of Colchester.

In 1947 he went to Merton College, Oxford, to read history, specialising in Richard II and John of Gaunt. Soon afterwards he published his DPhil on the medieval history of Ipswich.

== Academic career ==
Having completed research at the University of Manchester during 1952, Martin joined University College, Leicester as a lecturer in economic history. Whilst at Leicester, he was a reader in history, 1966–73, a public orator, 1971–74, and a professor of history, 1973–82. He was also for a term (1975–80) head of the university's history department and pro-vice-chancellor, 1979–82. He was a visiting professor at Carleton University, Ottawa, for the years 1958–59 and 1967–68.

In 1971 he returned to Merton College, where he had studied for his DPhil, as a visiting research fellow and in 1990 became a senior research fellow. In 1997 Martin and his former Oxford tutor Dr Roger Highfield published the first official history of the college, A History of Merton.

== Keeper of the Public Records ==
In May 1982 Martin was appointed Keeper of Public Records at the Public Record Office (PRO), where he remained until his retirement in 1988. He was a member of the executive committee of the International Council on Archives from 1984 and 1988; and he also played a leading role in the formation of the Association of Commonwealth Archivists in 1984, serving as its first chairman. In 1985 he led the first official delegation of British archivists to China, and he often represented the PRO overseas.

He ensured that the 900th anniversary of Domesday Book in 1986 was celebrated with a major public exhibition, held at Chancery Lane in the former Rolls Chapel. It was a great success, linking sound scholarship with the use of the then new technology of "talking heads".

He remains the only career academic who has ever had charge of the national archives, and later felt obliged to criticise the appointment of another head of the archives who he considered to be unsuitable for the job.

== Extramural activities and honours ==
He served as chairman of the council of the British Records Association from 1982 to 1991, and later became one of its vice-presidents. From 1984 to 1988 he was a vice-president of the Royal Historical Society. From 1987 to 1994 he was a member of the Royal Commission on the Historical Monuments of England.

He and his wife had a second home in the Lake District, and from 1999 to 2002 he served as president of the Cumberland and Westmorland Antiquarian and Archaeological Society.

He was appointed CBE in 1986.

== Later life, personal life and death ==
After his retirement Martin was appointed to a research chair at the University of Essex, where he taught on the Second World War. In 2002 he provided the introduction to the Penguin edition of Domesday Book, the first wholly English language edition of Domesday.

In 1953, Martin married Janet Hamer, another historian, and they had four children. Through his wife Martin developed his attachment to the Lake District, and in 1969 they bought a house there: when illness eventually reduced his activities during 2003, this was where he retired.

He died on 20 December 2007, aged 79.

== Publications ==
- 1948: The History of Colchester Royal Grammar School, 1539–1947, University College of Leicester, Department of English Local History. Occasional Papers. no. 5
- 1954: The Early Court Rolls of the Borough of Ipswich, Leicester: University College of Leicester
- 1955: The Borough and the Merchant Community of Ipswich, 1317–1422 (unpublished D.Phil. thesis, University of Oxford)
- 1956: "The Records of the Borough of Ipswich, to 1422", Journal of the Society of Archivists, Vol I, no. 4, pp. 87–93
- 1959: The Story Of Colchester From Roman Times To The Present Day, Colchester: Benham Newspapers
- 1961: "The Origins of Borough Record", Journal of the Society of Archivists, Vol II, no. 4, pp. 147–53
- 1963: "The English Borough in the Thirteenth Century", Trans. Royal Hist. Soc., 5th Series, XIII, 123–44
- 1963: The Royal Charters of Grantham, 1463–1688, Edited with a translation by G. H. Martin. Leicester: Leicester University Press
- 1971: "The Registration of Deeds of Title in the Medieval Borough", in Bullough, D. A. and Storey, R. L. (eds), The Study of Medieval Records: Essays in Honour of Kathleen Major, Oxford
- 1972: A Bibliography of British and Irish Municipal History: Vol.1: General Works (with Sylvia McIntyre) Leicester: Leicester University Press
- 1973: The Ipswich Recognizance Rolls 1294–1327: a Calendar, Suffolk Records Society, XVI). Ipswich
- 1986: "Domesday Book and the Boroughs", in Sawyer, P. H. (ed.), Domesday Book: a Reassessment London: Hodder Arnold
- 1994: "Doncaster Borough Charters" in G.H. Martin and others, "Doncaster A Borough and Its Charters" pp 11-25, Doncaster: Waterdale Press, 1994.
- 1997: "English Town Records, 1200–1350", in Britnell, R. (ed.), Pragmatic Literacy, East and West, pp 119–30. Woodbridge: Boydell and Brewer
