= Suffolk Records Society =

Local text publication society located in Suffolk, England

The Suffolk Records Society
- Founded: 1957
- Founder: Norman Scarfe; Geoffrey Martin
- Country of origin: United Kingdom
- Distribution: Boydell & Brewer
- Publication types: Books
- Nonfiction topics: Historical texts
- Official website: www.suffolkrecordssociety.com

The Suffolk Records Society is a local text publication society founded in 1957 to promote the study and preservation of Suffolk records from the Middle Ages to the present day. The society has published over 80 volumes as of 2015, divided into two book series, the Charters series for charters of Suffolk, and the General series.

== Origins ==
In the mid 1950's several heritage professionals discussed reviving the Victoria County History for Suffolk.
