= South Wales Record Society =

The South Wales Record Society is a text publication society. It was established in 1982 as the successor to the South Wales and Monmouth Record Society (active c.1949 to c.1963) with the aim of publishing important manuscript sources relating to South Wales.

== Publications of the South Wales Record Society ==
The Society publishes single-volume editions of important historical sources relating to South Wales, with introductory texts, indexes and illustrations.

1. Morganiae Archaiographia: a book of the antiquities of Glamorganshire, by Rice Merrick (1983)
2. Map of Glamorgan (1799)
3. Map of the County of Monmouth (1830)
4. Diaries of John Bird 1790–1803
5. Llandaff Episcopal Acta, 1140–1287
6. Letterbook of Richard Crawshay, 1788–1797
7. Diocese of Llandaff in 1763
8. History of Monmouthshire, Vol. 5
9. The Penrice Letters, 1768–1795
10. The Glamorgan Hearth Tax Assessment of 1670 (out of print)
11. The Diary of William Thomas, 1762–1795
12. Monmouthshire Wills proved in the Prerogative Court of Canterbury, 1560–1601
13. St Davids Episcopal Acta, 1085–1280
14. The Letterbook of John Byrd, Customs Collector in South-East Wales, 1647–80
15. The Pennard Manor Court Book 1673–1701
16. The Letter-Books of W. Gilbertson & Co., Pontardawe, 1890–1929
17. The Letters of Edward Copleston, Bishop of Llandaff, 1828–49
18. 'Women's Rights and Womanly Duties': The Aberdare Women's Liberal Association, 1891–1910
19. The Household Accounts of the Aubreys of Llantrithyd 1621–1637
20. In conversation with Napoleon Bonaparte: J. H. Vivian's visit to the Island of Elba (2008)
21. Men at Arms: musters in Monmouthshire, 1539 and 1601–2 (2009)
22. The Swansea Wartime Diary of Laurie Latchford, 1940–41 (2010)
23. Robert Morris and the first Swansea Copper Works, c.1727–1730 (2010)
24. The Correspondence of Thomas Henry Thomas 'Arlunydd Penygarn' (2012)
25. War Underground. Memoirs of a Bevin Boy in the South Wales Coalfield (2013)
26. Cas gan gythraul: Demonology, Witchcraft and Popular Magic in Eighteenth-century Wales (2015)
27. 'I hope to have a good passage...': the business letters of Captain Daniel Jenkins, 1902–11 (2016)
28. A Spiritual Botanology: Shewing What of God Appears in the Herbs of the Earth; Together with Some of Their Natural Virtues and Uses: In Blank Verse, and Rhime. By S. Lucilius Verus (Edmund Jones) (2017)
29. Charley's War: the diary of Charles Parkinson Heare, 2nd Battalion The Monmouthshire Regiment, 1914–1919 (2018)

Some publications have been digitised by the Welsh Journals Online project at the National Library of Wales.
