= Norfolk Record Society =

Text publication society in Norwich, England

- Founded: 1930
- Country of origin: United Kingdom
- Headquarters location: Norwich
- Nonfiction topics: Historic Records
- Official website: www.norfolkrecordsociety.org.uk

The Norfolk Record Society (NRS) was established in 1930 as a scholarly text publication society to publish historical documents relating to the history of Norwich and the county of Norfolk, England. The Society's objectives were to encourage the study and preservation of historical records relating to Norfolk.

The society is registered as a charity. Its membership is drawn mainly from East Anglia; however, individuals and institutions from around the world are also members.

== History ==
The Society was founded in 1930. It has published annually a transcript of a significant and sometimes unusual manuscript or collection of manuscripts. In the 1950s consideration was given to broadening the scope of the society to encompass Suffolk as the Norfolk and Suffolk Records Society. However, concerns were felt that unless the publishing schedule of the body could be doubled, each county would have to wait for two years instead of one until the next book relating to their county was made available. This led to the foundation of the Suffolk Records Society as a separate and independent bofy.

== Publications ==
The series now covers a time-span ranging from the 12th to 20th centuries. All publications are carefully edited, indexed and include introductions explaining the background of the documents they present.

The Society continues to publish on a wide range of subjects and encourages new researchers and members to submit ideas for future publications.

=== The Last Ten Volumes ===
Year	Volume Number	Title	Editor(s)
2023	LXXXVII	The Papers of Nathaniel Bacon of Stiffkey Volume VII 1614–1622	Barry Taylor, G. Alan Metters
2022	LXXXVI	The Literary Papers of the Reverend Jermyn Pratt (1723–1791)	Ema Vyroubalová, James Robert Wood
2021	LXXXV	The Letter Book of Thomas Baret of Norwich: merchant and textile manufacturer, 1672–1677	Siobhan Talbott
2020	LXXXIV	Humphry Repton and his family: Correspondence, 1805–1816	Heather Falvey
2019	LXXXIII	The Norwich Chamberlains’ Accounts 1539–40 to 1544–45	Carole Rawcliffe
2018	LXXXII	The Great Blow: Examinations and Informations relating to the Great Blow in Norwich, 1648	Andrew Hopper, Emily Wilbur Alley, Jean Agnew
2017	LXXXI	The Papers of Nathaniel Bacon of Stiffkey Volume VI, 1608–1613	Barry Taylor, Elizabeth Rutledge, George Alan Metters, Victor Morgan
2016	LXXX	The Cartulary of Binham Priory	Johanna Luise Margerum
2015	LXXIX	Her Price is Above Pearls: Family and Farming Records of Alice Le Strange, 1617–1656	Elizabeth Griffiths
2014	LXXVIII	The First World War Letters of Philip and Ruth Hewetson	Frank Meeres

== Other activities ==
The Society holds an annual lecture in conjunction with its annual publication launch.

== Norfolk Record Society Resources ==
The NRS maintains an extensive collection of historical resources, which are on deposit at the Norfolk Record Office at the Archive Centre in Norwich. Some information is provided on their website.
