= Scottish Record Society =

Text publication society

The Scottish Record Society is a text publication society founded at Edinburgh in 1897, but with earlier roots as the Scottish section of the British Record Society (founded 1889). Since its establishment it has published numerous volumes of calendars and indices of public records, private muniments and original manuscripts relating to Scotland and Scottish affairs. It is a registered Scottish charity.

Membership of the Society is open to all persons and institutions interested in its work. There is a governing council which manages the affairs of the society. George MacKenzie, former Keeper of the Records of Scotland and Registrar General, is President. The Chairman is Tristram Clarke. The Honorary Treasurer is Tessa Spencer. The Honorary Secretary is Samantha Smart.

During its first decade the Society concentrated on transcribing and publishing detailed indices of testaments (wills) proved in Scottish Commissariot Courts.

== Publications ==
The volumes of records produced by the SRS are part of a deep "empirical tradition" in Scottish historiography. Details of the Old Series, New Series, and Electronic Series publications may be found on the Society website. Recent volumes include:

- Watt, D. E. R., & Murray, A. L., eds, Fasti Ecclesiae Scoticanae Medii Aevi Ad Annum 1638, revised edition, 2003, ISBN 0-902054-19-8
- Shaw, D., ed., The Acts and Proceedings of the General Assemblies of the Church of Scotland 1560 to 1618, 2004, 3 vols., ISSN 0143-9448
- Fotheringham, Henry Steuart, ed., Munro, Jean, transcriber, Edinburgh Goldsmith's Minutes 1525–1700, 2006, ISSN 0143-9448
- Stewart, A. I. B., List of Inhabitants upon the Duke of Argyle's Property in Kintyre in 1792 ISBN 0-902054-12-0
- Torrance, D. Richard, Scottish Studio Photographers to 1914 & Workers in the Scottish Photographic Industry, 2011, 2 vols., ISSN 0143-9448
- Fotheringham, Henry S., ed., Munro, Jean, transcriber, Act Book of the Convenery of Deacons of the Trades of Edinburgh 1577–1755, 2011 (for 2012) 2 vols., ISSN 0143-9448
- John Finlay, ed., Admission Register of Notaries Public in Scotland, 1700–1799, 2 vols., ISSN 0143-9448

== See also ==
- Scottish History Society
- The Scottish Records Association website
