= Northamptonshire Record Society =

The Northamptonshire Record Society is an educational charity which promotes interest in and knowledge about the history of Northamptonshire. It publishes books and journals, operates a library and arranges talks, workshops and other events.

The Society is based at Wootton Hall Park, Northampton in a building shared with the Northamptonshire Record Office. Administrative details including the latest annual report and accounts are available from the Charity Commission

== Selected publications ==
=== Main series ===
==== 1920s ====
- Wake, J. ed., Quarter sessions records of the county of Northampton. Files for 6 Charles I and Commonwealth, A.D. 1630, 1657, 1657-8, 1 (1924)
- Mellows, W.T. ed., Henry of Pytchley's book of fees, 2 (1927)
- Wake, J. ed., A copy of papers relating to musters, beacons, subsidies, etc., in the county of Northampton, A.D. 1586-1623, 3 (1926)

==== 1930s ====
- Stenton, F.M. ed., Facsimiles of early charters from Northamptonshire collections, 4 (1930)
- Stenton, D.M. ed., The earliest Northamptonshire assize rolls, A.D. 1202 and 1203, 5 (1930)
- Peyton, S.A. ed., Kettering vestry minutes, A.D. 1797-1853, 6 (1933)
- Wake, J. ed., The Montagu musters book, A.D. 1602-1623, 7 (1935)
- Page, F.M. ed., Wellingborough manorial accounts, A.D. 1258-1323, from the account rolls of Crowland abbey, 8 (1936)
- Mellows, W.T. ed., Peterborough local administration, Parochial government before the Reformation. Churchwardens’ accounts, 1467-1573, with supplementary documents, 1107-1488, 9 (1939)
- Mellows, W.T. ed., Peterborough local administration, Parochial government from the Reformation to the Revolution. Minutes and accounts of the feoffees and governors of the city lands, with supplementary documents, 10 (1937)

==== 1940s ====
- Gollancz, M. ed., Rolls of Northamptonshire sessions of the peace. Roll of the supervisors, 1314-1316; roll of the keepers of the peace, 1320, 11 (1940)
- Mellows, W.T. ed., Peterborough local administration, The last days of Peterborough monastery, being part I of Tudor documents, a series relating chiefly to the surrender of the monastery, the administration of its temporalities during the interregnum before the establishment of the cathedral, the early government of the cathedral by the dean and chapter, and the Tudor bishops of the diocese of Peterborough, 12 (1947)
- Mellows, W.T. ed., Peterborough local administration, The foundation of Peterborough cathedral, A.D. 1541, being part II of Tudor documents, a series relating chiefly to the surrender of the monastery, the administration of its temporalities during the interregnum before the establishment of the cathedral by the dean and chapter, and the early government of the cathedral by the dean and chapter, 13 (1941)
- Whitaker, H., A descriptive list of the printed maps of Northamptonshire, A.D. 1576-1900, 14 (1948)

==== 1950s ====
- Lloyd, L.C.; Stenton, D.M. eds., Sir Christopher Hatton's book of seals; to which is appended a select list of the works of Frank Merry Stenton, 15 (1950)
- King, P.I. ed., The book of William Morton, almoner of Peterborough monastery, 1448-1467, transcribed by the late W.T. Stenton, 16 (1954)
- Isham, Sir Giles, bart. ed., The correspondence of Bishop Brian Duppa and Sir Justinian Isham, 1650-1660. With memoirs of the correspondents and an historical summary, 17 (1955)
- Nellows, W.T.; Gifford, D.H. eds., Peterborough local administration. Elizabethan Peterborough. The dean and chapter as lords of the city. Part III of Tudor documents, 18 (1956)
- Finch, M.E., The wealth of five Northamptonshire families, 1540-1640, 19 (1956)

==== 1960s ====
- Brooke, C.N.L.; Postan, M.M. eds., Carte nativorum: a Peterborough abbey cartulary of the fourteenth century, 20 (1960)
- Ramsay, G.D. ed., John Isham, mercer and merchant adventurer: two account books of a London merchant in the reign of Elizabeth I, 21 (1962)
- Elvey, G.R. ed., Luffield priory charters. Part I, 22 (1968)
- Pettit, P.A.J., The royal forests of Northamptonshire: a study in their economy, 1558-1714, 23 (1968)

==== 1970s ====
- Wake, J.; Champion Webster, D. eds., The letters of Daniel Eaton to the third earl of Cardigan, 1725-1732, 24 (1971)
- Hatley, V.A. ed., Northamptonshire militia lists, 1777, 25 (1973)
- Elvey, G.R. ed., Luffield priory charters. Part II, 26 (1975)
- Goring, J.; Wake, J. eds., Northamptonshire lieutenancy papers and other documents, 1580-1614, 27 (1975)
- Martin, J.D., The cartularies and registers of Peterborough abbey, Dean and Chapter of Peterborough, Anthony Mellows Memorial Trust I, 28 (1978)
- Nuttall, G.F., Calendar of the correspondence of Philip Doddridge, D.D. 1702-1751, 29 (1979)
- Sheils, W.j., The puritans in the diocese of Peterborough, 1558-1610, 30 (1979)

==== 1980s ====
- Gordon, P. ed., The red earl: the papers of the fifth Earl Spencer, 1835-1910. Vol. I: 1835-1885, 31 (1981)
- King, E. ed., A Northamptonshire Miscellany, 32 (1983)
- Greatrex, J. ed., Account rolls of the obedientiaries of Peterborough, Dean and Chapter of Peterborough, Anthony Mellows Memorial Trust 2, 33 (1984)
- Gordon, P. ed., The red earl: the papers of the fifth Earl Spencer, 1835-1910. Vol. II: 1885-1910, 34 (1986)
- Franklin, M.J. ed., The cartulary of Daventry Priory, 35 (1988)

==== 1990s ====
- Hainsworth, D.R.; Walker, C. eds., The correspondence of Lord Fitzwilliam of Milton and Francis Guybon, his steward, 1697-1709, 36 (1990)
- Hatley, V.A. ed., The Church in Victorian Northampton: visitation records of Bishop Magee, 1872-1886, 37 (1992)
- Hall, D., The open fields of Northamptonshire, 38 (1995)
- Bailey, B.A. ed., Northamptonshire in the early eighteenth century: the drawings of Peter Tillemans and others, 39 (1996)
- Gordon, P. ed., Politics and Society: the Journals of Lady Knightley of Fawsley, 1885 to 1913, 40 (1999)

==== 2000s ====
- Raban, S. ed., The White Book of Peterborough: the registers of Abbot William of Woodford, 1295–99 and Abbot Godfrey of Crowland, 1299-1321, Dean and Chapter of Peterborough, Anthony Mellows Memorial Trust 3, 41 (2001)
- Edwards, D et al. eds., Early Northampton wills, preserved in Northamptonshire Record Office, 42 (2005)
- Ward, G.S. ed., The 1851 religious census of Northamptonshire, Victor Hatley memorial Volume, 2, 43 (2007)
- Briston, M.E.; Halliday, T.M. eds., The Pilsgate Manor of the Sacrist of Peterborough Abbey. Part B of the Register of George Fraunceys, sacrist, c. 1404, 44 (2009)

==== 2010s ====
- McKay, P.H.; Hall, D.N. eds, Toseland, A. trans., Estate letters from the time of John, 2nd Duke of Montagu, 46 (2013)
- Briston, M. (trans), Peterborough Medieval Court Rolls, 48 (2015)
- Sharpling, P., Fragile Images. Post-medieval stained glass in Northamptonshire and the Soke of Peterborough, 49 (2016)
- Dunhill, R., Northamptonshire National Schools 1812-1854, 50 (2017)

=== Other ===
==== Victor Hatley Memorial Series ====
- Greenall, R.L. ed., The Autobiography of the Rev. John Jenkinson. Baptist Minister of Kettering and Oakham, 3 (2010)
- Brooker, K. ed., Recollections of William Arnold, 4 (2014)
- Lyon, N., ‘Useless Anachronisms?’ a Study of the Country Houses and Landed Estates of Northamptonshire Since 1880, 5 (2018)
