= Surrey Archaeological Society =

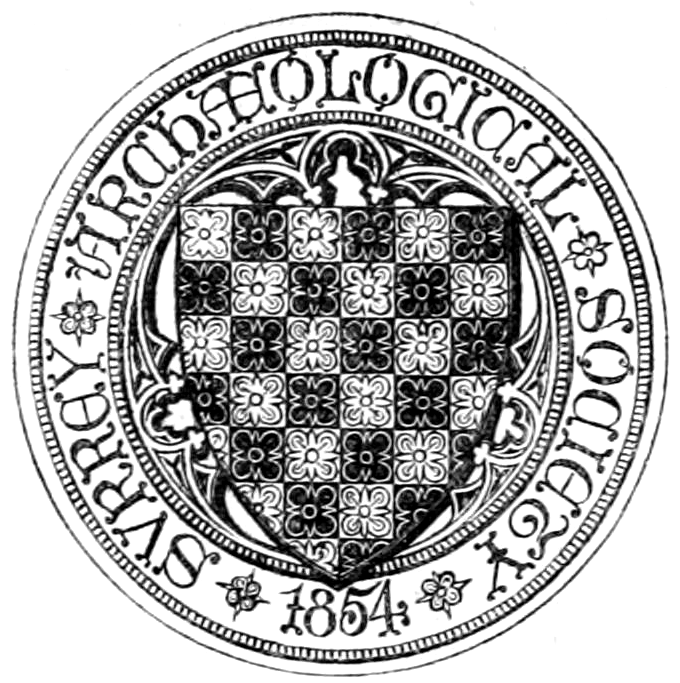
The Surrey Archaeological Society logo

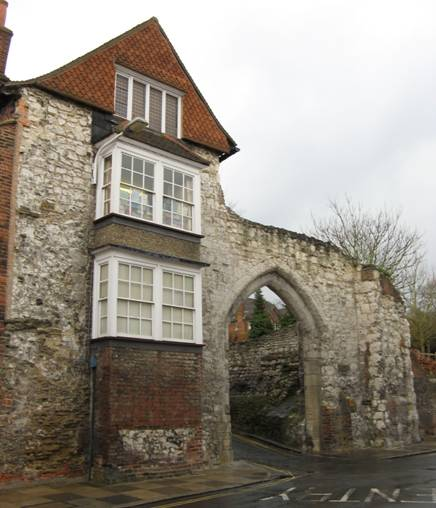
Castle Arch, Guildford

Surrey Archaeological Society is a county archaeological society, founded in 1854 for "the investigation of subjects connected with the history and antiquities of the County of Surrey" in England.

== Aims ==
The Society concerns itself with "the County of Surrey within the boundaries existing in 1854 … and as may be enlarged by any extension of the present Administrative County". Its geographical interests therefore cover, in addition to the modern administrative county of Surrey, the areas now forming the London boroughs of Lambeth, Wandsworth, Southwark, Croydon, Kingston, Merton, Sutton, and Richmond; as well as the district of Spelthorne, which became part of the county only in 1965. Where appropriate, however, the Society works in close cooperation with other archaeological agencies, such as Museum of London Archaeology.

== Headquarters and activities ==
The Society's headquarters, which include an extensive library, are located at Castle Arch, Guildford. The building also houses Guildford Museum, itself originally established by the Society, although now quite independent. The Society incorporates nine Special Interest Groups: the Artefacts and Archives Recording Group; the Local History Group; the Medieval Studies Forum; the Prehistoric Group; the Roman Studies Group; the Surrey Industrial History Group; the Villages Study Group; the Guildford Archaeology and Local History Group; and the Research Committee.

== Publications ==
Collections of the Surrey Archæological Society; volume 9; 1888

The Society's official journal is Surrey Archaeological Collections, first published in 1858, and which now appears annually.

Since 1973, the journal has been supplemented by Surrey History, a more popular historical magazine. The Society also issues a regular bimonthly Bulletin, containing news, short reports and articles, and notices of forthcoming events.

The Society has also published a number of occasional single issue publications, notably in its Research Volumes, Research Papers and Village Studies series. It has published two larger multi-authored volumes providing a broader overview of the county's archaeology and history:

- Bird, Joanna; Bird, D.G., eds. (1987). The Archaeology of Surrey to 1540. Guildford: Surrey Archaeological Society. ISBN 0950134562.
- Cotton, Jonathan; Crocker, Glenys; Graham, Audrey, eds. (2004). Aspects of Archaeology and History in Surrey: towards a research framework for the county. Guildford: Surrey Archaeological Society. ISBN 0954146034.

The Surrey Industrial History Group publishes its own Newsletter, and other occasional publications.

In 1894 the Society published a calendar of medieval Surrey feet of fines, edited by Frank Lewis, as "Surrey Archaeological Collections, Extra Volume 1". In the event this was the only "extra volume" ever published. In 1912, the honorary secretary, Hilary Jenkinson (himself an archivist), finding a lack of enthusiasm within the society for further sustained record publication, established the Surrey Record Society as an independent body, and the two societies have coexisted amicably ever since.

== Notable members ==
- Hilary Jenkinson (joint honorary secretary 1908–10; honorary secretary 1910–16, 1920–24; honorary editor; president, 1954–61)

== See also ==
- Croydon Natural History & Scientific Society
- Surrey Historic Buildings Trust
