= List and Index Society =

The List and Index Society (L&IS) is a United Kingdom learned society that publishes finding aids, calendars and editions of archival records. It also publishes occasional monographs.

The society was founded in 1965 by Sir Geoffrey Elton and others, with the aim of publishing and distributing "photographic copies of unprinted lists and indexes kept in the Public Record Office, London, and of other unprinted guides and aids to the use of public archives in the British Isles", so that historians working at a distance from London could find out what was available in advance of their visits. More recently, photocopied lists and indexes have been replaced by the online catalogue but the society continues to provide a service to historians by publishing augmented lists, calendars and texts of historical manuscripts both in The National Archives and in other repositories, supplementing the online catalogue.
