= Canterbury and York Society =

British text publication society

The Canterbury and York Society is a British text publication society founded in 1904. It publishes scholarly editions of English medieval (pre-Reformation) ecclesiastical records, notably episcopal registers.

== History and activities ==
The Society was founded in 1904. The genealogist and publisher W.P.W. Phillimore was prominent in its establishment. Its name was taken from those of the two provinces of the Church of England, Canterbury and York; and its joint presidents are the two current Archbishops of Canterbury and York.

It endeavours to publish one volume a year: its 100th volume appeared in 2010. The great majority of its publications are editions of the registers of bishops and archbishops (of which it has published over fifty, some in several volumes); but other types of ecclesiastical record also fall within its remit.

The Society holds an annual meeting, which includes a lecture on an aspect of English church history by a leading scholar.

Membership (individual or institutional) is open to all. In return for an annual subscription, the member receives that year's volume and the right to purchase back volumes at a discount.

== Publications ==
Recent volumes have included:

- Hughes, J. B., ed. (2001). The Register of Walter Langton, Bishop of Coventry and Lichfield, 1296–1321, vol. 1. Canterbury & York Society. Vol. 91.
- Kemp, B. R., ed. (2001). Twelfth-century English Archdiaconal and Vice-Archdiaconal Acta. Canterbury & York Society. Vol. 92.
- Timmins, T. C. B., ed. (2002). The Register of William Melton, Archbishop of York, 1317–1340, volume V. Canterbury & York Society. Vol. 93.
- Robinson, O. F., ed. (2003). The Register of Walter Bronescombe, Bishop of Exeter, 1258–1280, vol. 3. Canterbury & York Society. Vol. 94.
- Logan, D. D., ed. (2005). The Medieval Court of Arches. Canterbury & York Society. Vol. 95.
- Storey, R. L., ed. (2006). The Register of Thomas Appleby, Bishop of Carlisle, 1363–1395. Canterbury & York Society. Vol. 96.
- Hughes, J. B., ed. (2007). The Register of Walter Langton, Bishop of Coventry and Lichfield, 1296–1321, vol. 2. Canterbury & York Society. Vol. 97.
- Condliffe Bates, J., ed. (2008). The Register of William Bothe, Bishop of Coventry and Lichfield, 1447–1452. Canterbury & York Society. Vol. 98.
- Bennett, N. H., ed. (2009). The Register of Richard Fleming, Bishop of Lincoln: 1420–1341 volume II. Canterbury & York Society. Vol. 99.
- Dodd, G.; McHardy, E., eds. (2010). Petitions to the Crown from English Religious Houses, c.1272–1485. Canterbury & York Society. Vol. 100.
- Robinson, D., ed. (2011). The Register of William Melton, Archbishop of York, 1317–1340, volume VI. Canterbury & York Society. Vol. 101.
- Woolgar, C. M., ed. (2011). Testamentary Records of the English and Welsh Episcopate 1200–1413: Wills, Executors' Accounts and Inventories, and the Probate Process. Canterbury & York Society. Vol. 102.
- Clarke, P. D.; Zutshi, P. N. R., eds. (2012). Supplications from England and Wales in the Registers of the Apostolic Penitentiary 1410–1503. Vol. I: 1410–1464. Canterbury & York Society. Vol. 103.
- Clarke, P. D.; Zutshi, P. N. R., eds. (2014). Supplications from England and Wales in the Registers of the Apostolic Penitentiary 1410–1503. Vol. II: 1464–1492. Canterbury & York Society. Vol. 104.
- Clarke, P. D.; Zutshi, P. N. R., eds. (2015). Supplications from England and Wales in the Registers of the Apostolic Penitentiary 1410–1503. Vol. III: 1492–1503. With Indexes to Volumes I–III. Canterbury & York Society. Vol. 105.
- Stevenson, J. H., ed. (2016). The Register of Edward Story, Bishop of Chichester 1478–1503. Canterbury & York Society. Vol. 106.
- Bradford, Phil; McHardy, Alison K., eds. (2017). Proctors for Parliament: Clergy, Community and Politics, c.1248–1539, Vol.1. Canterbury & York Society. Vol. 107.
- Bradford, Phil; McHardy, Alison K., eds. (2018). Proctors for Parliament: Clergy, Community and Politics, c.1248–1539, Vol.1. Canterbury & York Society. Vol. 108.
- Gemmill, Elizabeth, ed. (2019). The Register of John Salmon, Bishop of Norwich 1299–1325. Canterbury & York Society. Vol. 109.
