= Surrey Record Society =

Surrey Record Society is a text publication society which edits and publishes historic records relating to the county of Surrey, England. The society concerns itself with the historic county, which includes, in addition to the current administrative county, the areas now forming the London boroughs of Lambeth, Wandsworth, Southwark, Croydon, Kingston, Merton, Sutton, and Richmond. The Society has also published two editions of registers of medieval bishops of Winchester, Surrey having historically formed part of the Diocese of Winchester.

== History ==
The Society was established in 1912, largely on the initiative of Hilary Jenkinson (1882–1961), then an archivist at the Public Record Office and also honorary secretary of the Surrey Archaeological Society. It had become clear that the Archaeological Society was unable or unwilling to commit itself to a sustained programme of publication of archival sources for the county's history, and Jenkinson believed that an entirely new body was necessary. He became its secretary, and his Record Office colleague M. S. Giuseppi its general editor. Giuseppi stood down in 1924 to be succeeded by Jenkinson, who held the positions of secretary and general editor jointly until 1950. In that year he was elected president of the Society. In these roles, Jenkinson established many of the principles of record editing and publication which were subsequently adhered to not only by the Surrey Record Society itself, but also more widely.

== Publications ==
The Society's first publication, which appeared in two volumes issued in parts between 1913 and 1924, was Registrum Johannis de Pontissara, the register of John of Pontoise (d. 1304), Bishop of Winchester 1282–1304.

Recent volumes, which illustrate the range of subject-matter addressed, have included:

- Ward, W. R., ed. (1994). Parson and Parish in Eighteenth-Century Surrey: replies to Bishops' Visitations. Surrey Record Society. Vol. 34. Guildford. ISBN 0902978098.
- Robinson, D., ed. (1997). The 1851 Religious Census: Surrey. Surrey Record Society. Vol. 35. Guildford. ISBN 0902978101.
- Crocker, A. G.; Crocker, G. M.; Fairclough, K.; et al., eds. (2000). Gunpowder Mills: documents of the seventeenth and eighteenth centuries. Surrey Record Society. Vol. 36. Woking. ISBN 090297811X.
- Neal, S., ed. (2002). The 1235 Surrey Eyre: Vol. III: Index. Surrey Record Society. Vol. 37. Woking. ISBN 0902978128.
- Hershey, Andrew H., ed. (2004). The 1258–9 Special Eyre of Surrey and Kent. Surrey Record Society. Vol. 38. Woking. ISBN 0902978136.
- Herridge, D. M., ed. (2005). Surrey Probate Inventories, 1558–1603. Surrey Record Society. Vol. 39. Woking. ISBN 0902978144.
- Stewart, Susan, ed. (2006). The 1263 Surrey Eyre. Surrey Record Society. Vol. 40. Woking. ISBN 0902978152.
- Chalklin, C. W., ed. (2009). Surrey Gaol and Session House, 1791–1824. Surrey Record Society. Vol. 41. Woking. ISBN 9780902978164.
- Haines, R. M., ed. (2010). The Register of John de Stratford, Bishop of Winchester, 1323–1333: Vol. I. Surrey Record Society. Vol. 42. Woking. ISBN 9780902978171.
- Haines, R. M., ed. (2011). The Register of John de Stratford, Bishop of Winchester, 1323–1333: Vol. II. Surrey Record Society. Vol. 43. Woking. ISBN 9780902978188.
- Malcolmson, P.; Malcolmson, R., eds. (2012). Warriors at Home, 1940–1942: three Surrey diarists. Surrey Record Society. Vol. 44. Woking. ISBN 9780902978195.
- Stewart, Susan, ed. (2013). Royal Justice in Surrey, 1258–1269. Surrey Record Society. Vol. 45. Woking. ISBN 9780902978201.
- Stone, David, ed. (2017). The Accounts for the Manor of Esher in the Winchester Pipe Rolls, 1235–1376. Surrey Record Society. Vol. 46. Woking. ISBN 9780902978218.

== Publication numbering and formats ==
In the interest of speedy publication, it was the Society's practice in its early decades to issue its texts in serial form, as editing work progressed, in "parts" (or fascicles), with card covers. The intention was that, once all the parts comprising a volume had appeared, members could bind them together. Some volumes were issued in parts irregularly over several years, interspersed with parts of other volumes. Publications were generally issued with two separate numerical identifiers, a volume number and a "number" (i.e. a part number), but the details supplied on the covers and title-pages were not always complete or consistent. The practice led to bibliographical confusion for librarians and readers, and was abandoned after the Second World War. Beginning with volume 22 (published in 1955), all volumes were issued complete.

From volume 25 (1964) onwards, all volumes have been published in a uniform burnt sienna hardback binding.
