= Stair Society =

- Formation: 17 September 1934; 92 years ago
- Type: Learned society
- Purpose: Encouragement of study, and advancement of knowledge, of the history of Scots Law
- Region served: Scotland
- Members: 335
- President: Lady Wolffe
- Main organ: Council
- Website: www.stairsociety.org

The Stair Society is a learned society devoted to the study of Scots law. It was instituted in 1934 "to encourage the study and to advance the knowledge of the history of Scots Law," and is named after James Dalrymple, 1st Viscount of Stair, the seventeenth century Lord President of the Court of Session considered the most important of Scots Law's Institutional Writers. It can compared to the Selden Society, an organisation devoted to the study of English legal history.

== Society ==
The society has around three hundred and thirty five members from Scotland and around the world. The society holds an annual general meeting in November, which includes a guest lecture. Recent distinguished figures to have addressed the society included Alan Watson, Rogers Professor at the University of Georgia School of Law, and John H. Langbein, Sterling Professor of Law and Legal History at Yale Law School. The society is run by a council, chaired by John Ford, professor of civil law at the University of Aberdeen School of Law. The president of the society is Lady Wolffe.

As part of its aim of furthering study Scots legal history, the Stair Society produces printed and electronic publications, specifically an annual volume along with occasional other publications. The society's literary director is Mark Godfrey, professor of legal history at the University of Glasgow School of Law.

The society previously provided a postgraduate scholarship to support someone undertaking doctoral research in Scots legal history. The scholarship has had one successful graduate, Dr Thomas Green, who is now a lecturer at the University of Aberdeen School of Law. The programme is currently suspended.

== Viscount Stair ==
James Dalrymple, 1st Viscount of Stair, generally known as Viscount Stair, was an important political figure in seventeenth century Scotland and served as Lord President of the Court of Session from 1671 to 1681 and 1689 to 1695. The first edition of his "Institutions of the Law of Scotland", an account of the private law of Scotland according to the judgements of the Court of Session, was published in 1681, and the work is now considered the foundation of modern Scots law.

== See also ==
- Selden Society
