= Calendar (archives) =

Descriptive list of documents

A calendar (sometimes historically spelled kalendar) is, in the context of archival science, textual scholarship, and documentary editing, a descriptive list of documents. The verb to calendar means to compile or edit such a list. The word is used differently in Britain and North America with regard to the amount of detail expected: in Britain, it implies a detailed summary which may be used as a substitute for the full text; whereas in North America it implies a more basic inventory.

== Etymology ==
The term "calendar" derives from a (now somewhat archaic) word meaning a list or register of any kind. Although the documents in a calendar are generally arranged in chronological order, the term has no direct relationship to a table of dates.

== British tradition ==
In the British tradition, the word normally implies a full descriptive summary (often published) in which each document is the subject of a "carefully controlled, rigorously consistent précis". All significant elements in the text are recorded, so that the great majority of researchers will be spared the need to consult the originals: the completed calendar effectively becomes a substitute for the archival documents, and is often treated as a primary source in its own right. Trivial or incidental elements ("common form and unnecessary verbiage") are omitted; but all names, dates and significant statements are noted, and passages which appear to the editor to be of particular interest or importance may be quoted in full. Documents in archaic or foreign languages (particularly Latin) are normally calendared in the modern vernacular, but significant or ambiguous terms or passages may be given in the original language. A calendar is therefore less detailed or comprehensive than a series of full transcripts or translations; but considerably more detailed than an archival list or other finding aid.

Calendars are at their most useful when published, giving remote users access to the contents of archival records. Well-known series of published calendars of British medieval and early modern sources include the Calendar of Charter Rolls (1903–1927); the Calendar of Close Rolls (1900–1963); the Calendar of Patent Rolls (1891–); the Calendars of State Papers (Domestic and Foreign) (1856–); the Calendars of Treasury Books and Papers (1868–1962) (all from material now in The National Archives); the Calendars of Entries in the Papal Registers relating to Great Britain and Ireland (published by the Public Record Office 1896–1960, and by the Irish Manuscripts Commission 1978–); the Letters and Papers of the Reign of Henry VIII (1864–1932); and the "Reports and Calendars" series on privately held archives published between 1869 and 2004 by the Royal Commission on Historical Manuscripts.

In Irish historiography, the destruction of the Public Record Office of Ireland during the Irish Civil War means that calendars made before 1922 are often the most complete surviving records.

In the era of print publishing a précis of a text had the advantage of taking up less space than a full transcript or facsimile. This reasoning carries less weight in the age of electronic publishing; but calendars still have a role in providing readers with an accurate, comprehensive and accessible summary of a document which may be more readily comprehensible than a more faithful and complete version of the original.

Roy Hunnisett writes:

At a first glance a calendar might seem easier to produce than a fully edited transcript, but that is not so. Indeed, an adequate calendar represents an editorial stage beyond a transcript.

Similarly, Paul Harvey emphasises that the editorial task of calendaring "is not the soft option that editors have sometimes assumed"; and that the process of summarising accurately without error or distortion can be "significantly harder than straightforward editing".

== North American tradition ==
In the North American tradition, a "calendar" generally implies a briefer and more summary list or inventory than in Britain, arranged chronologically. Its intention is to provide a succinct indication of the documents' date, origin and subject-matter, but little more; and it is designed as a finding aid to locate the originals, not as a substitute for them.

== Bibliography ==
- Harvey, P. D. A. (2001). Editing Historical Records. London: British Library. ISBN 0712346848.
- Hunnisett, R. F. (1977). Editing Records for Publication. Archives and the User. Vol. 4. London: British Records Association. ISBN 0-900222-05-0.
- Stevens, Michael E.; Burg, Steven B. (1997). Editing Historical Documents: a handbook of practice. Walnut Creek: AltaMira Press. pp. 67–69. ISBN 0761989595.
