= Down's Syndrome Association =

British charity

- Abbreviation: DSA
- Formation: 1970
- Legal status: registered charity (registered in England No. 1061474) and company (no. 3310024)
- Headquarters: London
- Location: Teddington
- Region served: United Kingdom
- Chief Executive: Carol Boys
- Main organ: DSA Journal (twice a year)
- Budget: £2.2 million
- Website: www.downs-syndrome.org.uk

The Down's Syndrome Association (DSA) is a British charity which describes itself as being the only organisation in the United Kingdom that focuses solely on all aspects of living successfully with Down's syndrome.

The Association states its mission as being: to provide information and support for people with Down's syndrome, their families and carers, and the professionals who work with them; to strive to improve knowledge of the condition; and to champion the rights of people with Down's syndrome.

The Association was founded in 1970 by Rex Brinkworth as a local group and now has 20,000 members and about 126 local groups. Its headquarters is at the Langdon Down Centre, formerly Normansfield Hospital, built as a private hospital by John Langdon Down, the "Father of Down's Syndrome".

The Langdon Down Centre includes the Langdon Down Museum of Learning Disability about the history of treating people with learning disabilities, and the Normansfield Theatre.

Former footballer Kevin Kilbane, whose elder daughter has Down's syndrome, is a patron of the charity.
