= James Henry Pullen =

British autistic savant

Pullen in a Royal Navy uniform, holding what appears to be a navigational chart.

James Henry Pullen (1835–1916), also known as the Genius of Earlswood Asylum, was a British savant, who possibly had aphasia.

== Childhood ==
Pullen was born in Dalston, London in 1835, and grew up on the Balls Pond Road. Both he and his brother William were regarded as deaf, mute and were developmentally disabled. By the age of 7 Pullen had learned only one word, mother, which he pronounced as "muvver". He could, however, lip read, understand gestures, and write intelligible blank verse. As a child, he began to carve small ships out of firewood and draw pictures of them. Pullen was first confined to Essex Hall, Colchester.

== Earlswood ==
At the age of 15, in 1850, he was taken to the then new Earlswood Asylum (later called Royal Earlswood Hospital), in Reigate, Surrey. Contemporary account tells that Pullen could not give any answers through speech, but could communicate through gestures. He could read lips and gestures but never learned to read or write beyond one syllable. Pullen's brother William later followed him to Earlswood; a good painter, he died at the age of 35.

Earlswood Asylum tried to teach its patients a number of handicrafts so they could support themselves and the asylum. Pullen continued his handicrafts and became a gifted carpenter and cabinet maker. He would work at workshop at days and draw at night. Most of the drawings were of the corridors of the asylum and he framed them himself. If Pullen could not find a suitable tool, he would make it himself. In addition he would also make practical items, such as bed frames, for the needs of the asylum.

Pullen was alternatively aggressive or sullen. He could be reserved but also wrecked his workshop once in a fit of anger. He did not like to accept advice and wanted always to get his own way. Once he took a dislike to a certain member of the staff and built a guillotine-like contraption over his door. Luckily for the target, it went off too late. Once, when Pullen developed an obsession to marry a townswoman he fancied, the staff mollified him by giving him an admiral's uniform instead.

== Notability ==
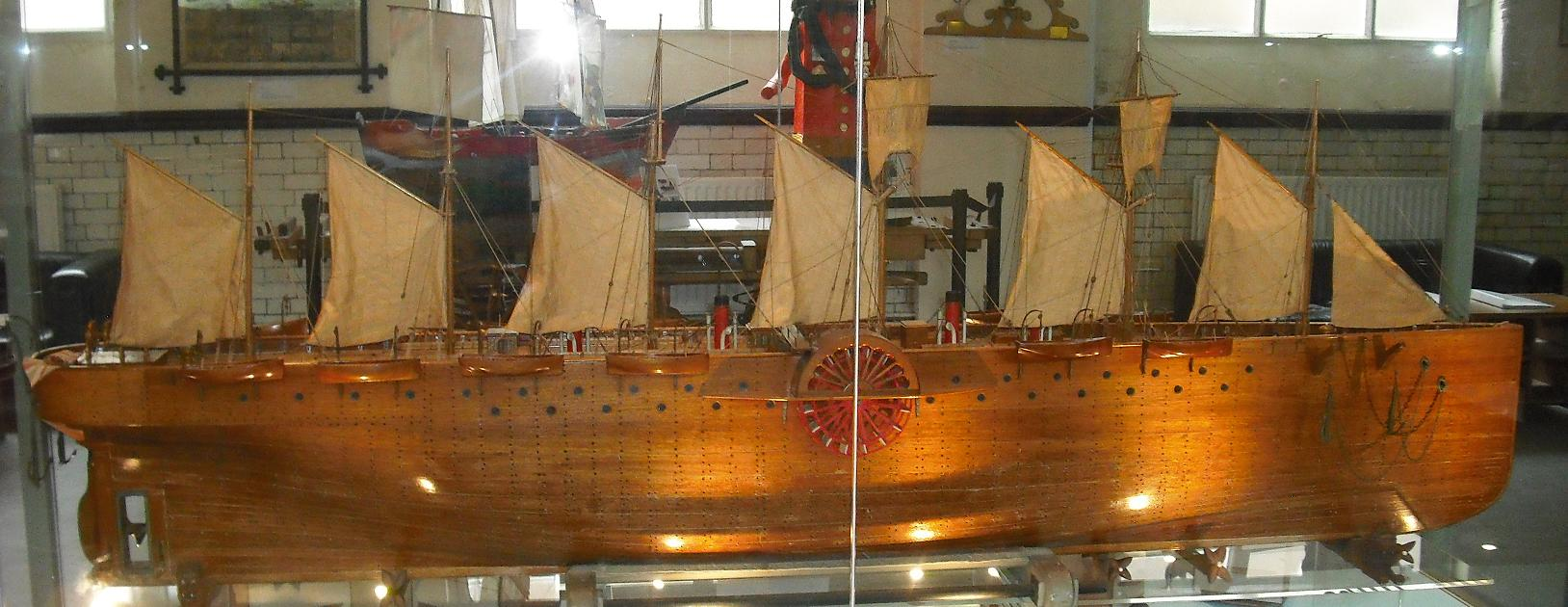
Pullen's model of SS Great Eastern displayed at the Langdon Down Museum

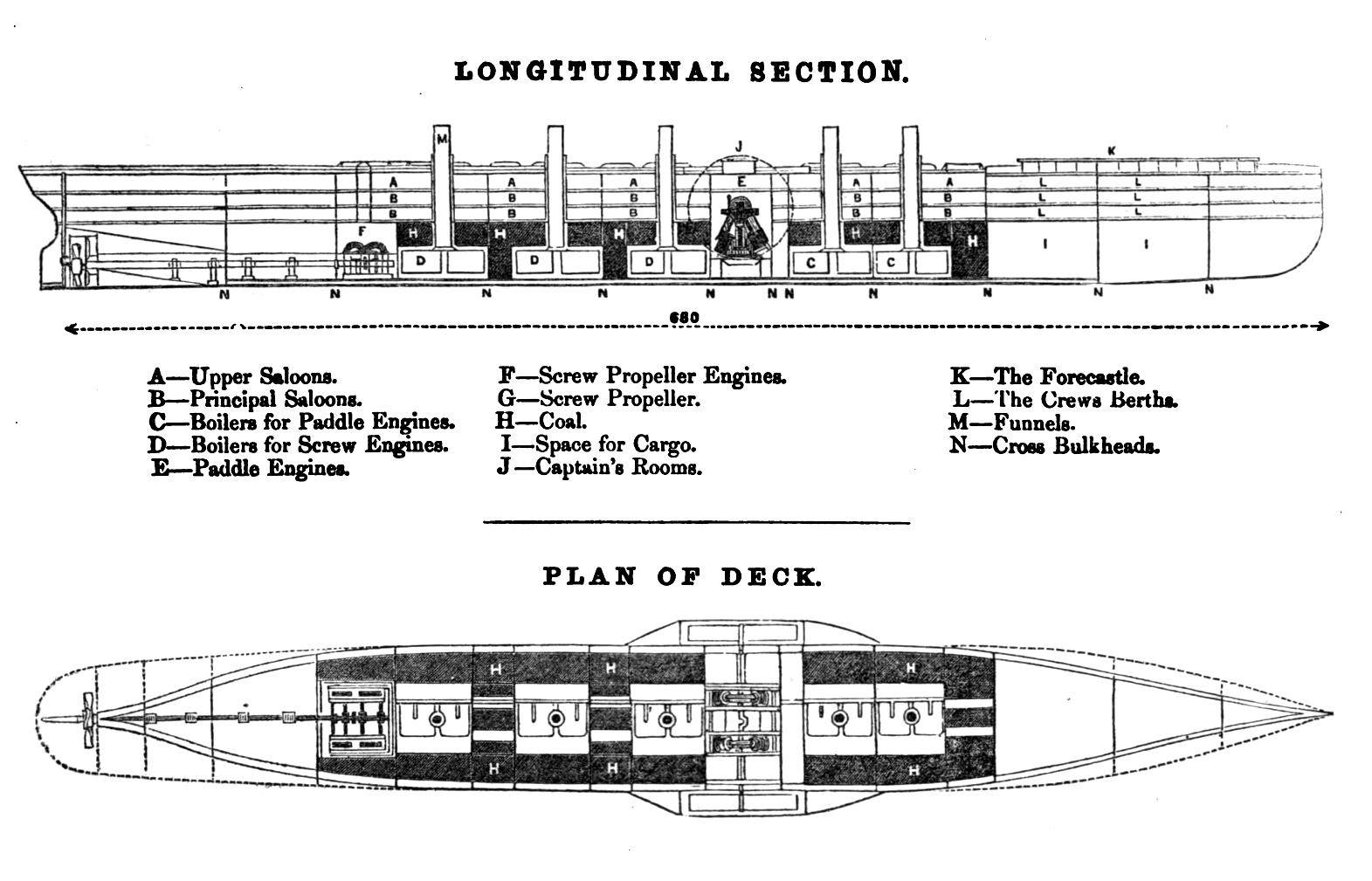
compare with the sectional plan of SS Great Eastern

Queen Victoria accepted some of the drawings and Prince Albert received one Pullen had drawn of the Siege of Sebastapol in the Crimean War, based on newspaper accounts. He even attracted the interest of the Prince of Wales, future king Edward VII; Pullen referred to him as "Friend Wales." Prince Edward sent him pieces of ivory so he could carve them. This intricate object, made from ebony and rare timbers, features two ivory angels on one side which appear in conflict with a brass tongued devil attempting to haul the boat back. The ivory came from tusks given to Pullen by his patron, Edward VII, who took great interest in him and his endeavours. Pullen also created models of fantasy craft including The State Barge designed as a floating office for Queen Victoria, with a desk and miniature documents visible through the circular windows. Sir Edwin Henry Landseer sent engravings of his paintings to Pullen and his brother Arthur so they could copy them.

Asylum superintendent John Langdon Down, after whom Down syndrome is named, gave Pullen a great deal of leeway. For example, he was allowed to eat his meals with the staff.

Pullen's masterpiece is a model ship, a 10-foot long replica of SS Great Eastern, that he started in 1870 and spent seven years building; Pullen made all the details, including 5,585 rivets, 13 lifeboats and interior furniture in miniature, himself. In its maiden voyage the model ship sank for lack of buoyancy but Pullen repaired that flaw later. The model was exhibited in the Crystal Palace.

Pullen also built a large, mechanical mannequin, now known as "James Henry Pullen's giant", in the middle of his workshop; he would sit inside it, manipulate its face and appendages and talk through a concealed bugle in its mouth.

== Legacy ==
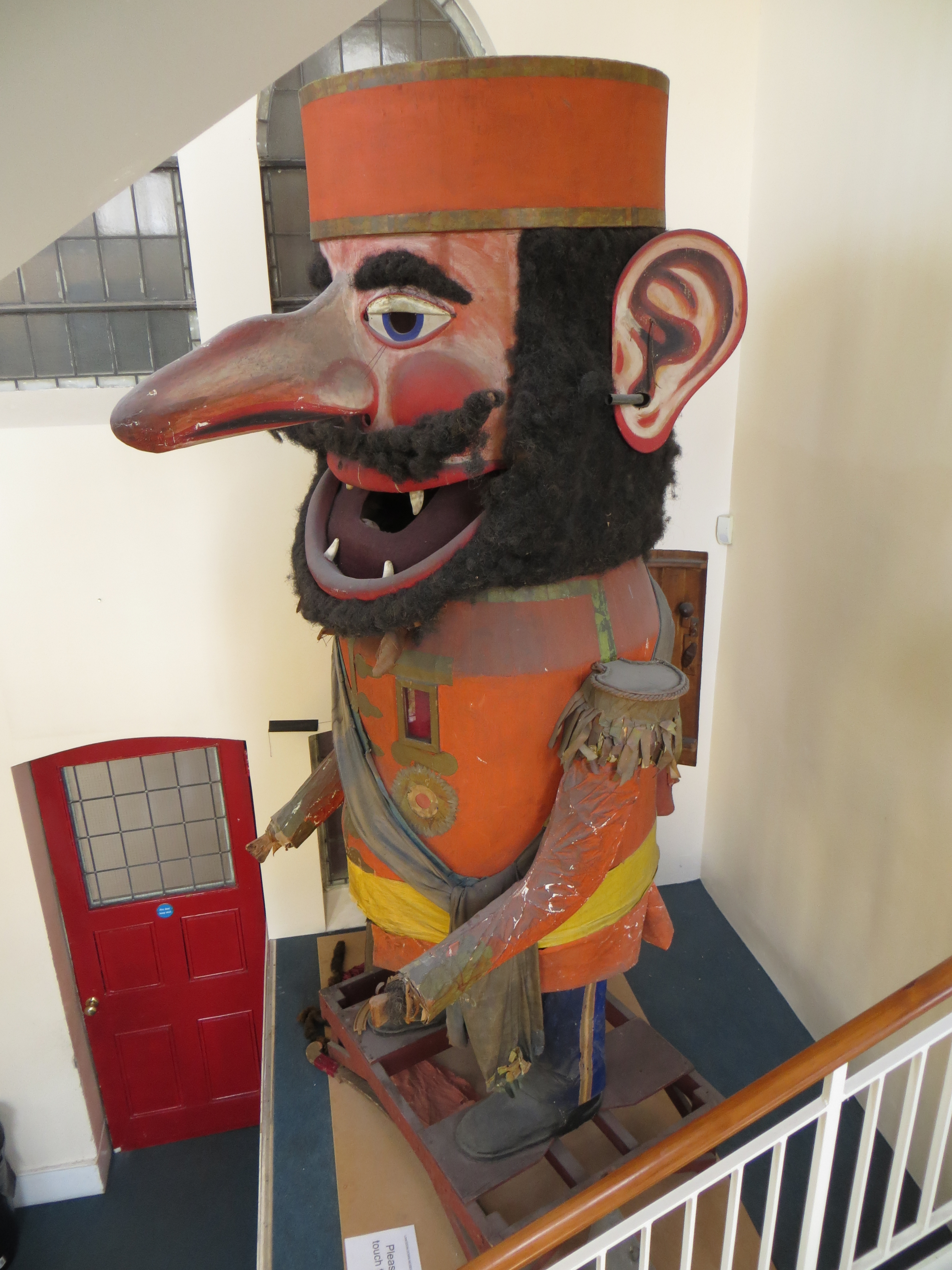
James Henry Pullen's giant, in the Langdon Down Museum of Learning Disability.

After Pullen's death in 1916, his workshop became a museum of his work until the Royal Earlswood Hospital was closed in 1997. It is now an apartment complex. Pullen's model of SS Great Eastern may be seen, being part of the James Henry Pullen Collection including more of his designs and art work, in the Museum at the Langdon Down Centre, Normansfield, Teddington. In 2018, Pullen's work was the subject of a monographic exhibition at Watts Gallery – Artists' Village. Pullen's model of The State Barge was displayed at the Royal College of Nursing's exhibition A history of care or control? 100 years of learning disability nursing.

== Bibliography ==
- Crayon, C. (1888). All about Earlswood. London Earlswood Asylum for Idiots.
- Down, J. L. (1867). Observations on an Ethnic Classification of Idiot. British Journal of Psychiatry, April 1867, 13:121–123.
- Millard, W. (1864). The Idiot and his Helpers, including the History of Essex Hall; together with Notices of the Rise and Progress of the Earlswood Asylum and similar institutions. Colchester: Simpkin, Marshall and Co.; Longman and Co.
- Sano. F. (1918). James Henry Pullen, the Genius of Earlswood. Journal of Mental Science, No. 266, Vol. LXIV.
- Tredgold, A. F. (1922). Mental Deficiency.
- Treffert, D. A. (1989). Extraordinary People: Exploration of the Savant Syndrome. Transworld.
- Ward, O. Conor. (2006). Dr. John Langdon Down and Normansfield. Teddington, England. Langdon Down Centre Trust.
- Tambling, Kirsten (2018). "James Henry Pullen: inmate, inventor, genius". Exhibition Catalogue, Watts Gallery – Artists' Village, 19 June – 28 October 2018. ISBN 978-0-9933902-3-4.
- Tambling, Kirsten (2020). The Idiot as Artist: The Fantasy Boats of James Henry Pullen, Art History, November 2020, 43:928-952
