= Buckinghamshire Archaeological Society =

Flag of Buckinghamshire

The Buckinghamshire Archaeological Society is an archaeological and historical society for the English county of Buckinghamshire. It was founded in 1847. It publishes an annual journal, Records of Buckinghamshire.

The society's records department was separated in 1947 when it became the Buckinghamshire Record Society.

== Selected publications ==
- Archaeological investigations at Missenden Abbey (2018)
- My Dearest Ben: The personal letters of Benjamin Disraeli, by Thea van Dam
- Toll Roads of Buckinghamshire, by Peter Gulland
- Quarrendon: Aylesbury’s lost medieval village, by Michael Farley
- The Chilterns in 1748: An account by Pehr Kalm, visitor from Finland, edited and translated by professor William Mead

== See also ==
- Centre for Buckinghamshire Studies
