= Brinkworth =

Brinkworth may refer to:

- Brinkworth (surname)
- Brinkworth, South Australia
- Brinkworth, Wiltshire, United Kingdom
