= Brinkworth (surname) =

Brinkworth is a surname. Notable people with the surname include:

- Bob Brinkworth (born 1942), Canadian ice hockey player and coach
- E. R. C. Brinkworth (1901–1978), British historian
- Norman Brinkworth (born 1944), Pakistani hurdler
- Rex Brinkworth, (1929–1998), British philanthropist
