= Lucy Green =

British academic

Lucy Green, FBA (born 1957) is an Emerita Professor of Music Education at the UCL Institute of Education, UK. She had a key role in bringing the informal learning practices of popular and other vernacular musicians to the attention of music-educators, thus transforming classroom practice.

== Biography ==
Green studied music and education at Homerton College, University of Cambridge; then taking a Masters in Music and a Doctorate in Music Education at Sussex University. She taught the piano during her post-graduate studies and became a school music teacher and Head of Music in secondary education. She joined the Institute of Education (now part of University College London) in 1990, where she taught on initial teacher education courses, masters and doctoral degrees. She has been Professor of Music Education there since 2004. Green joined Isleworth Baroque (now Richmond Opera) in 2009, initially as a singer and later producing and directing several productions.

== Professional work ==
Green's study of how popular musicians learn, and her initial ideas for how their learning practices can be translated into formal music education has been described as a watershed in music education. Building on this work, Green led the Informal Learning Pathfinder of the UK project, Musical Futures which took central characteristics of informal music learning methods and adapted them to classroom environments. This change in teaching approaches resulted in a rise in student motivation. Subsequently, she developed similar pedagogies for the specialist instrumental lesson. In 2016 Musical Futures was placed in the Top 100 Global Educational Innovations by the Finnish organisation ‘HundrED’.

Green's work is used in schools and teacher-training programmes in the UK, USA, Canada, Australia, Singapore, Brazil, Cyprus and elsewhere. Her work has also been influential in other areas of the sociology of music education, particularly concerning gender, musical meaning and ideology, and popular music pedagogy. Green has more recently co-authored with Dr David Baker the results of research into the lives and learning of blind and partially-sighted musicians. Her publications have been translated into Spanish, Portuguese, German, Italian, Greek, Swedish, Dutch, and Chinese.

== Awards and honours ==
Honorary Doctorate for Services to Music Education, University of Hedmark, Norway in 2014.

On 22 July 2022, Green was elected a Fellow of the British Academy (FBA), the United Kingdom's national academy for the humanities and social sciences.

== Bibliography ==
- 2017, (co-authored with David Baker), Insights in Sound: Visually Impaired Musicians’ Lives and Learning, London and New York: Routledge ISBN 978-1138209312
- 2011, (editor) Learning, Teaching and Musical Identity: Voices Across Cultures, Bloomington: Indiana University Press. ISBN 9780253000880
- 2008, Music Education as Critical Theory and Practice: Selected Essays, London and Burlington, VT:Ashgate Contemporary Thinkers on Critical Musicology Series ISBN 9781409461005
- 2008, Music, Informal Learning and the School: A New Classroom Pedagogy, London and New York: Ashgate Press ISBN 978 0 7546 6522 9
- 2001/02, How Popular Musicians Learn: A Way Ahead For Music Education, London and New York: Ashgate Press (238 pp); ISBN 0 7546 0338 5 (hardback); issued in 2002 as paperback; re-printed 2003, 2005, 2008
- 1997, Music, Gender, Education, Cambridge University Press (282 pp), (ISBN 9780521555173) re-printed 2001, 2004, 2007

2001, published in Spanish as Musica, Género y Educación, Ediciones Morata, ISBN 84-7112-454-8

- 1988/2008, Music on Deaf Ears: Musical Meaning, Ideology and Education, Manchester and New York: Manchester University Press (165 pp), ISBN 0-7190-2647-4 (hb); re-printed as paperback, 1990; 2008,

published in a revised second edition: Bury St. Edmunds: Abramis Publishing
