= SS Great Eastern =

British sailing steamship launched in 1858

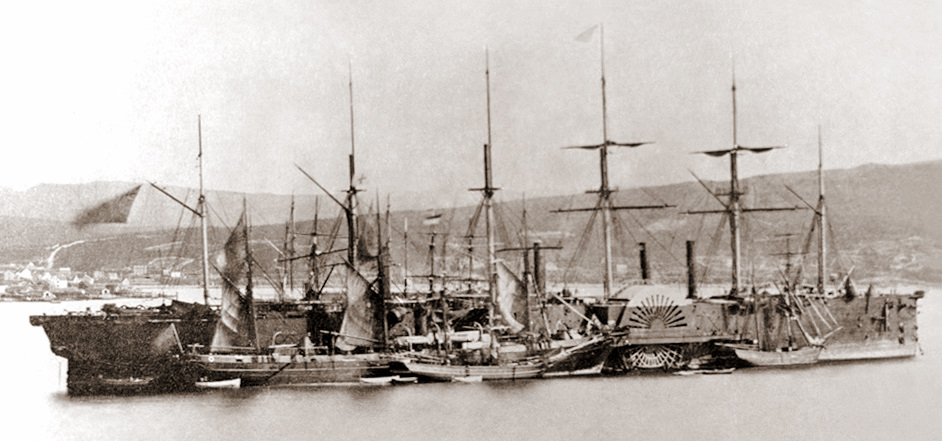
- Great Eastern at Heart's Content after laying the first lasting transatlantic cable, July 1866

History

United Kingdom
- Name: Great Eastern
- Operator: Eastern Steam Navigation Co. (1858–1864)
- Port of registry: Liverpool, United Kingdom
- Ordered: 1853
- Builder: J. Scott Russell & Co., Millwall, England
- Laid down: 1 May 1854
- Launched: 31 January 1858
- Completed: August 1859
- Maiden voyage: 30 August 1859
- In service: 1859
- Out of service: 1889
- Stricken: 1889
- Home port: Liverpool
- Nickname(s): The Great Ship, Leviathan (Original name), Great Babe (As Brunel called her)
- Fate: Scrapped 1889–1890
- Notes: Struck rocks on 27 August 1862.; No larger ship in all respects until 1901 by the RMS Celtic.

General characteristics
- Type: Passenger ship
- Tonnage: 18,915 GRT, 13,344 NRT
- Displacement: 32,160 tons
- Length: 692 ft (211 m)
- Beam: 82 ft (25 m)
- Decks: 4 decks
- Propulsion: Four steam engines for the paddles and an additional engine for the propeller. Total power estimated at 8,000 hp (6,000 kW). Rectangular boilers
- Speed: 14 knots (26 km/h; 16 mph)
- Boats & landing craft carried: 18 lifeboats; after 1860 20 lifeboats
- Capacity: 4,000 passengers
- Complement: 418

SS Great Eastern was an iron-hulled steamship designed by Isambard Kingdom Brunel, and built by John Scott Russell & Co. at Millwall Iron Works on the River Thames, London, England. Powered by both sidewheels and a screw propeller, she was by far the largest ship ever built at the time of her 1858 launch, and had the capacity to carry 4,000 passengers from England to Australia without refuelling. Her length of 692 feet (211 m) was surpassed only in 1899, by the 705-foot (215 m) 17,274-gross-ton RMS Oceanic, her gross tonnage of 18,915 was surpassed only in 1901, by the 701-foot (214 m) 20,904-gross-ton RMS Celtic and her 4,000-passenger capacity was surpassed only in 1913, by the 4,234-passenger SS Imperator. Her five funnels (later reduced to four) was unusual for the time. She also had the largest set of paddle wheels in existence.

Brunel knew her affectionately as the "Great Babe". He died in 1859 shortly after her maiden voyage, during which she was damaged by an explosion. After repairs, she plied for several years in her intended use as a passenger liner between Britain and North America, her voyages made largely unprofitable by her high initial and operating costs. Within a few years she was repurposed to lay underwater cable, laying the first lasting transatlantic telegraph cable in 1866. Finishing her life as a floating music hall and advertising hoarding (for the department store Lewis's) in Liverpool, she was broken up on Merseyside in 1889.

== History ==
=== Concept ===
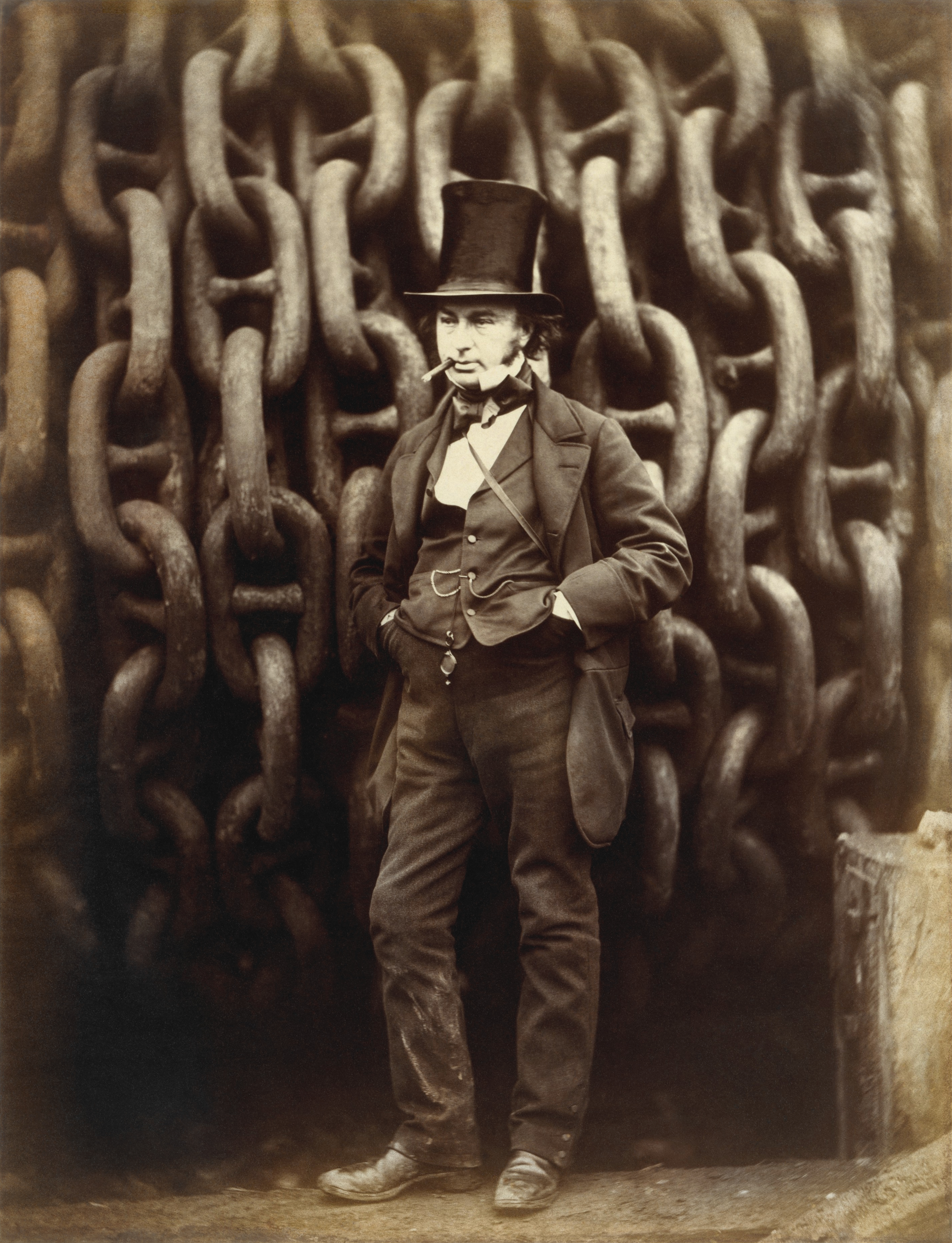
The famous photograph by Robert Howlett of Brunel before the ship's launching chains

After his success in pioneering steam travel to North America with Great Western and Great Britain, Brunel turned his attention to a vessel capable of making longer voyages as far as Australia. With a planned capacity of 15,000 tons of coal, Great Eastern was envisioned as being able to sail halfway around the world without taking on coal, while also carrying so much cargo and passengers that papers described her as a "floating city" and "the Crystal Palace of the sea". Brunel saw the ship as being able to effectively monopolize trade with Asia and Australia, making regular trips between Britain and either Sri Lanka or Australia.

On 25 March 1852, Brunel made a sketch of a steamship in his diary and wrote beneath it: "Say 600 ft x 65 ft x 30 ft" (180 m x 20 m x 9.1 m). These measurements were six times larger by volume than any ship afloat; such a large vessel would benefit from economies of scale and would be both fast and economical, requiring fewer crew than the equivalent tonnage made up of smaller ships. Brunel realised that the ship would need more than one propulsion system; since twin screws were still very much experimental, he settled on a combination of a single screw and paddle wheels, with auxiliary sail power. Although Brunel had pioneered the screw propeller on a large scale with Great Britain, he did not believe that it was possible to build a single propeller and shaft (or, for that matter, a paddleshaft) that could transmit the required power to drive his giant ship at the required speed.

Brunel showed his idea to John Scott Russell, an experienced naval architect and ship builder whom he had first met at the Great Exhibition. Scott Russell examined Brunel's plan and made his own calculations as to the ship's feasibility. He calculated that it would have a displacement of 20,000 tons and would require 8,500 horsepower (6,300 kW) to achieve 14 knots (26 km/h; 16 mph), but believed it was possible. At Scott Russell's suggestion, they approached the directors of the Eastern Steam Navigation Company with the new design plan. The James Watt Company would design the ship's screw, Professor Piazzi Smyth would design its gyroscopic equipment, and Russell himself would build the hull and paddle wheel.

=== 1854–1859: Construction to launch ===
==== Construction ====
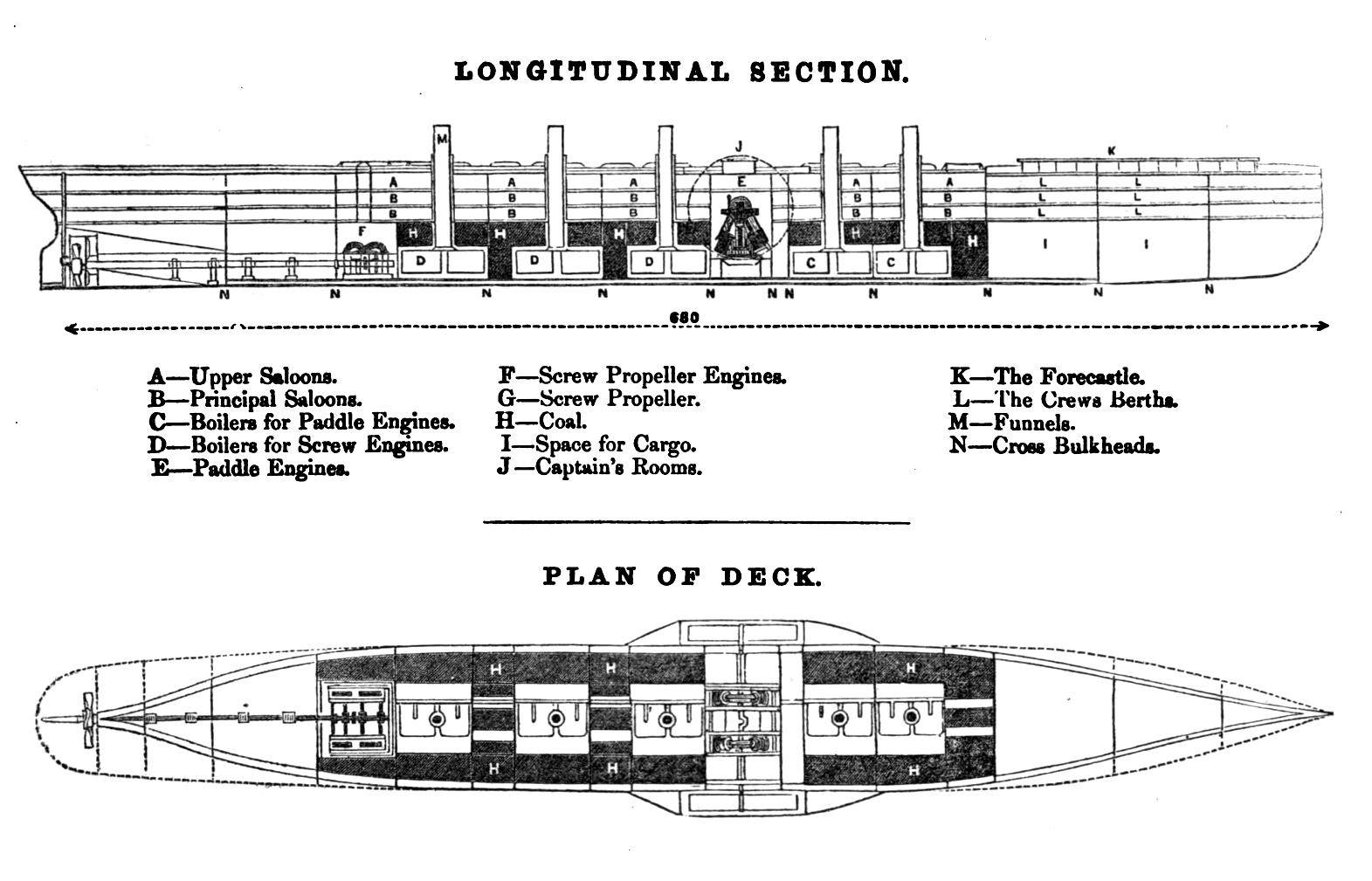
Sectional plan of Great Eastern

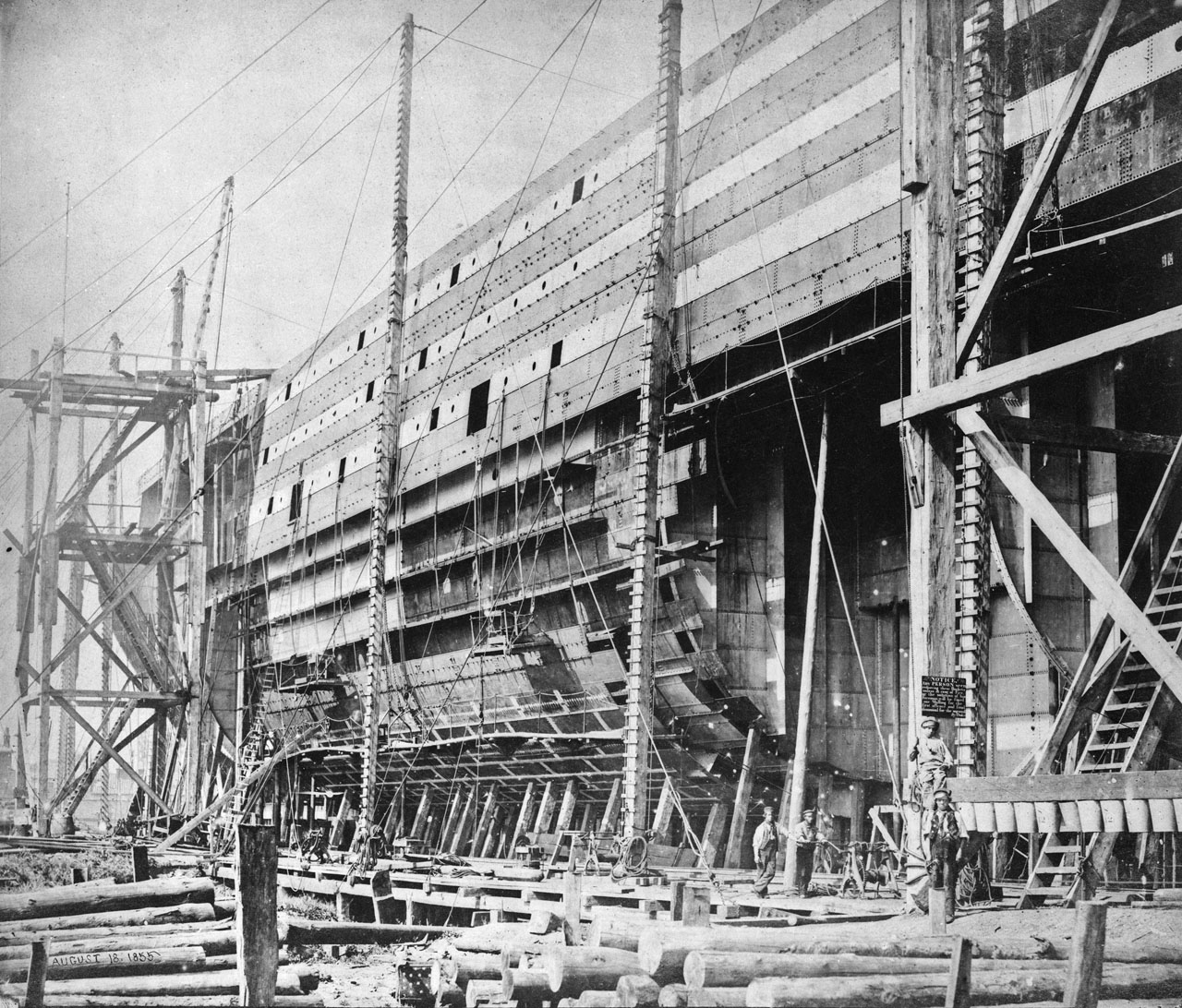
Construction of Great Eastern, August 18, 1855

Brunel entered into a partnership with Scott Russell to build Great Eastern. Unknown to Brunel, Russell was in financial difficulties. The two men disagreed on many details. It was Brunel's final great project, and he collapsed from a stroke after being photographed on her deck, and died only ten days later, a mere four days after Great Eastern's first sea trials. About the ship, Brunel said "I have never embarked on any one thing to which I have so entirely devoted myself, and to which I have devoted so much time, thought and labour, on the success of which I have staked so much reputation."

Great Eastern was built by Messrs Scott Russell & Co. of Millwall, Middlesex, England, the keel being laid down on 1 May 1854. She was 211 metres (692 ft 3 in) long, 25 metres (82 ft 0 in) wide, with a draught of 6.1 metres (20 ft 0 in) unloaded and 9.1 metres (29 ft 10 in) fully laden, and displaced 32,000 tons fully loaded. In comparison, SS Persia, launched in 1856, was 119 m (390 ft 5 in) long with a 14 m (45 ft 11 in) beam. She was at first named Leviathan, but her high building and launching costs ruined the Eastern Steam Navigation Company and so she lay unfinished for a year before being sold to the Great Eastern Ship Company and finally renamed Great Eastern.

The hull was an all-iron construction, a double hull of 19-millimetre (0.75 in) wrought iron in 0.86 m (2 ft 10 in) plates with ribs every 1.8 m (5 ft 11 in). Her roughly 30,000 iron plates weighed 340 kilograms (1/3 long ton) each, and were cut over individually made wooden templates before being rolled to the required curvature. Internally the hull was divided by two 107 m (351 ft 1 in) long, 18 m (59 ft 1 in) high, longitudinal bulkheads and further transverse bulkheads dividing the ship into nineteen compartments. Great Eastern was the first ship to incorporate a double-skinned hull, a feature which would not be seen again in a ship for 100 years, but which would later become compulsory for reasons of safety. To maximize her fuel capacity, stored coal was bunkered around and over her 10 boilers; which provided steam at 172 kPa (25 PSI). She had sail, paddle and screw propulsion. The paddle-wheels were 17 m (55 ft 9 in) in diameter and the four-bladed screw-propeller was 7.3 m (23 ft 11 in) across. The power came from four steam engines for the paddles and an additional engine for the propeller. The cylinders for the paddle engines measured 1.87 m (74 in) bore and 4.3 m (14 ft) stroke. The four cylinders for the screw engine measured 2.13 m (84 in) bore and 1.21 m (4.0 ft) stroke. Total power was estimated at 6,000 kilowatts (8,000 hp). She had six masts (said to be named after the days of a week – Monday being the fore mast and Saturday the spanker mast), providing space for 1,686 square metres (18,150 sq ft) of sails (7 gaff and maximum 9 (usually 4) square sails), rigged similar to a topsail schooner with a main gaff sail (fore-and-aft sail) on each mast, one "jib" on the fore mast and three square sails on masts no. 2 and no. 3 (Tuesday & Wednesday); for a time mast no. 4 was also fitted with 3 yards. In later years, some of the yards were removed. According to some sources she would have carried 5,435 m^{2} (58,500 sq ft) in sails. Setting sails turned out to be unusable at the same time as the paddles and screw were under steam, because the hot exhaust from the five (later four) funnels would set them on fire. Her maximum speed was 13 knots (24 km/h; 15 mph). She was involved in a series of accidents during construction, with 6 workers being killed.

==== Launch ====
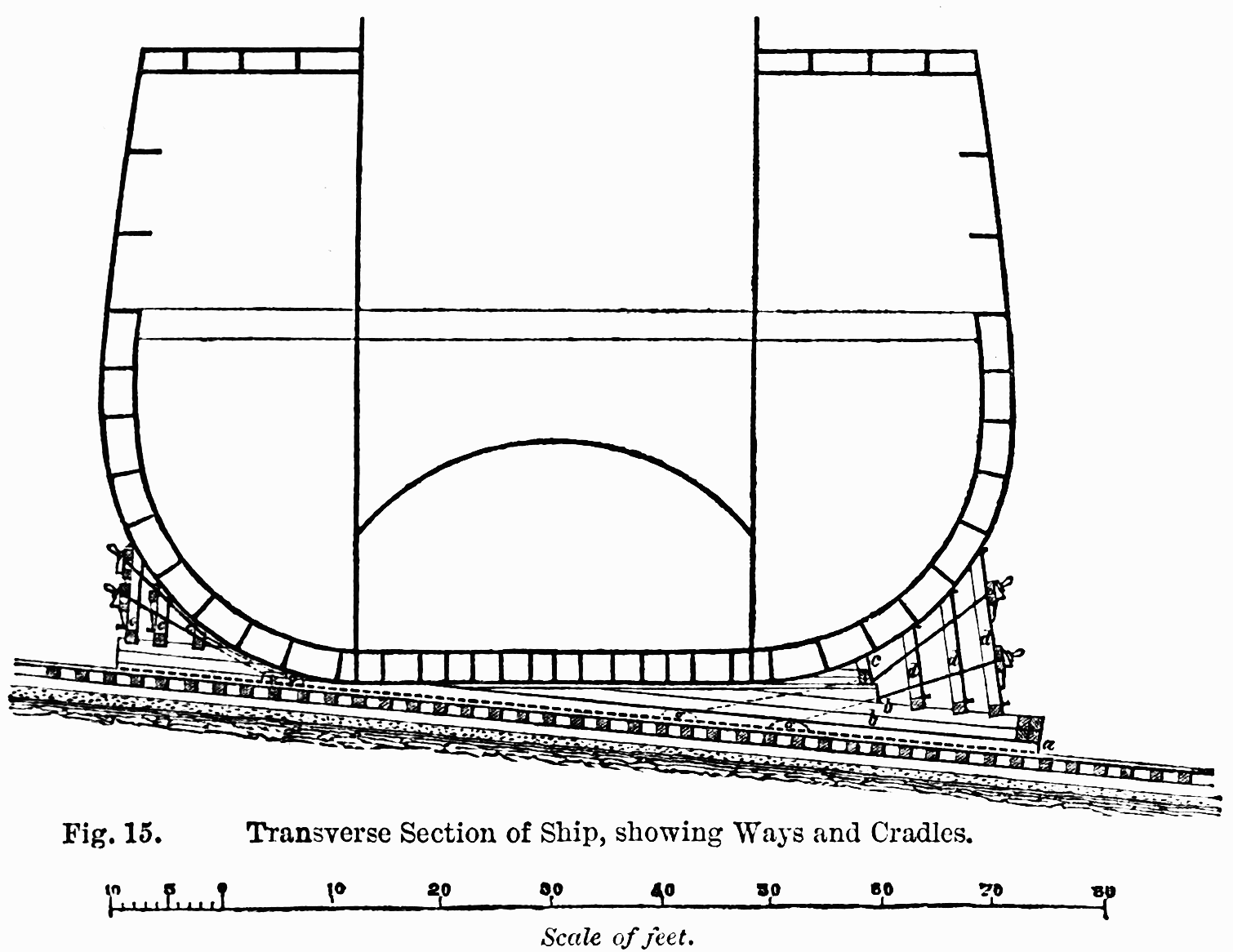
Section of Great Eastern with launching cradle on slipway

Great Eastern was planned to be launched on 3 November 1857. The ship's massive size posed major logistical issues; according to one source, the ship's 19,000 tons (12,000 inert tons during the launch) made it the single heaviest object moved by humans to that point. On 3 November, a large crowd gathered to watch the ship launch, with notables present including the Comte de Paris, the Duke of Aumale, and the Siamese ambassador to Britain. The launch, however, failed, and the ship was stranded on her launch rails – in addition, two men were killed and several others injured, leading some to declare Great Eastern an unlucky ship. Brunel rescheduled the launch for January 1858, hoping to use the tide in the next launch attempt.

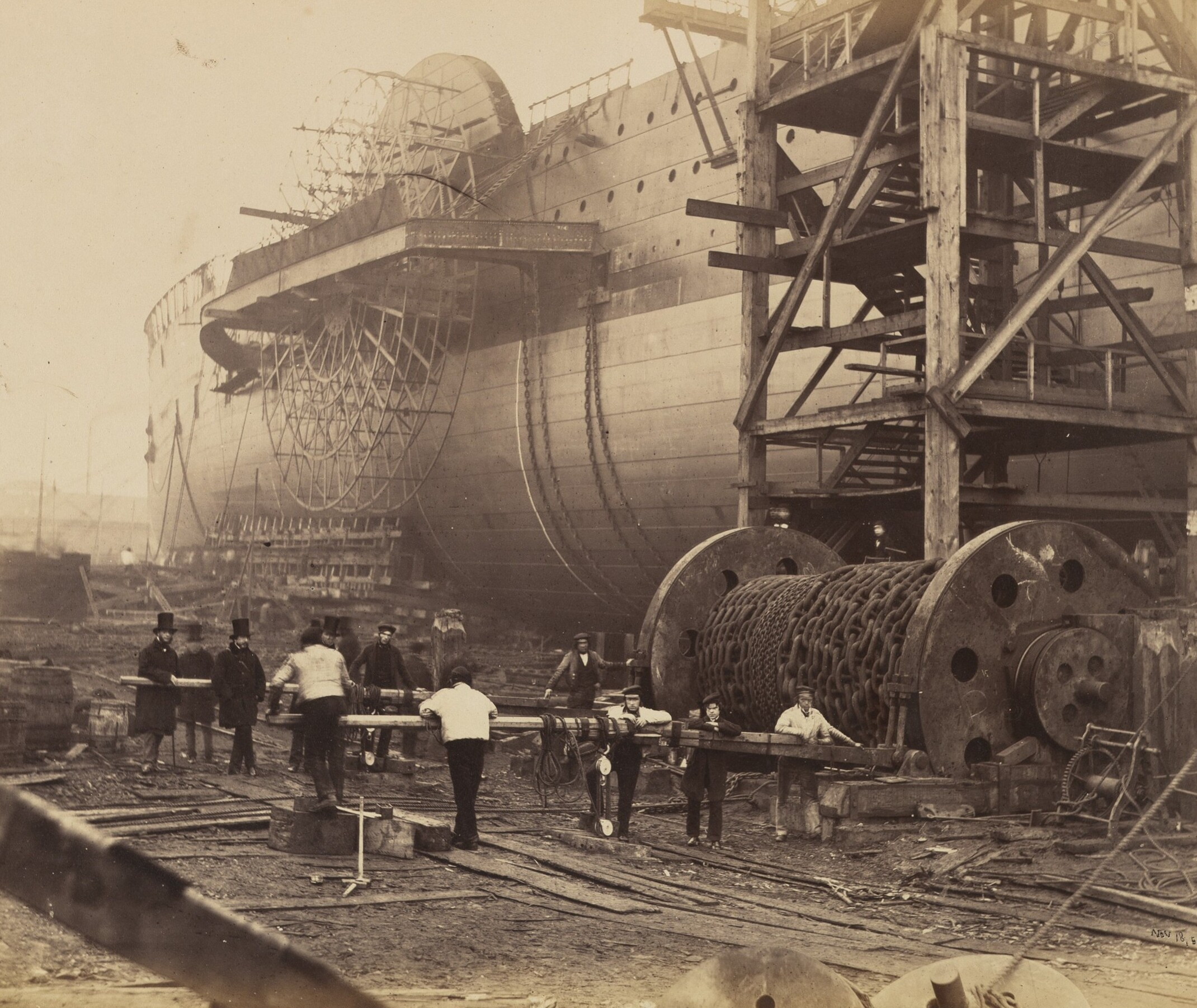
Great Eastern two months before launch, November 1857.

In the leadup to the second launch, Brunel and Great Eastern's backers gathered a significant number of chains, jacks, hydraulic rams, and windlasses to assist in launching the ship. Some were obtained from sympathetic engineers, others through returned favours, and yet more for increasing sums of money; so lucrative was renting out of supplies for the ship's launch that engineer Richard Tangye was able to found his own engineering firm (Tangye & Co) the next year, remarking that "We launched Great Eastern, and she launched us". Advice sent to Brunel on how to launch the ship came from a number of sources, including steamboat captains on the Great Lakes and one admirer who wrote an insightful description on how the massive Bronze Horseman had been erected in Saint Petersburg. High winds prevented the ship from being launched on 30 January, but the next morning a fresh attempt successfully launched the ship around 10:00 in the morning.

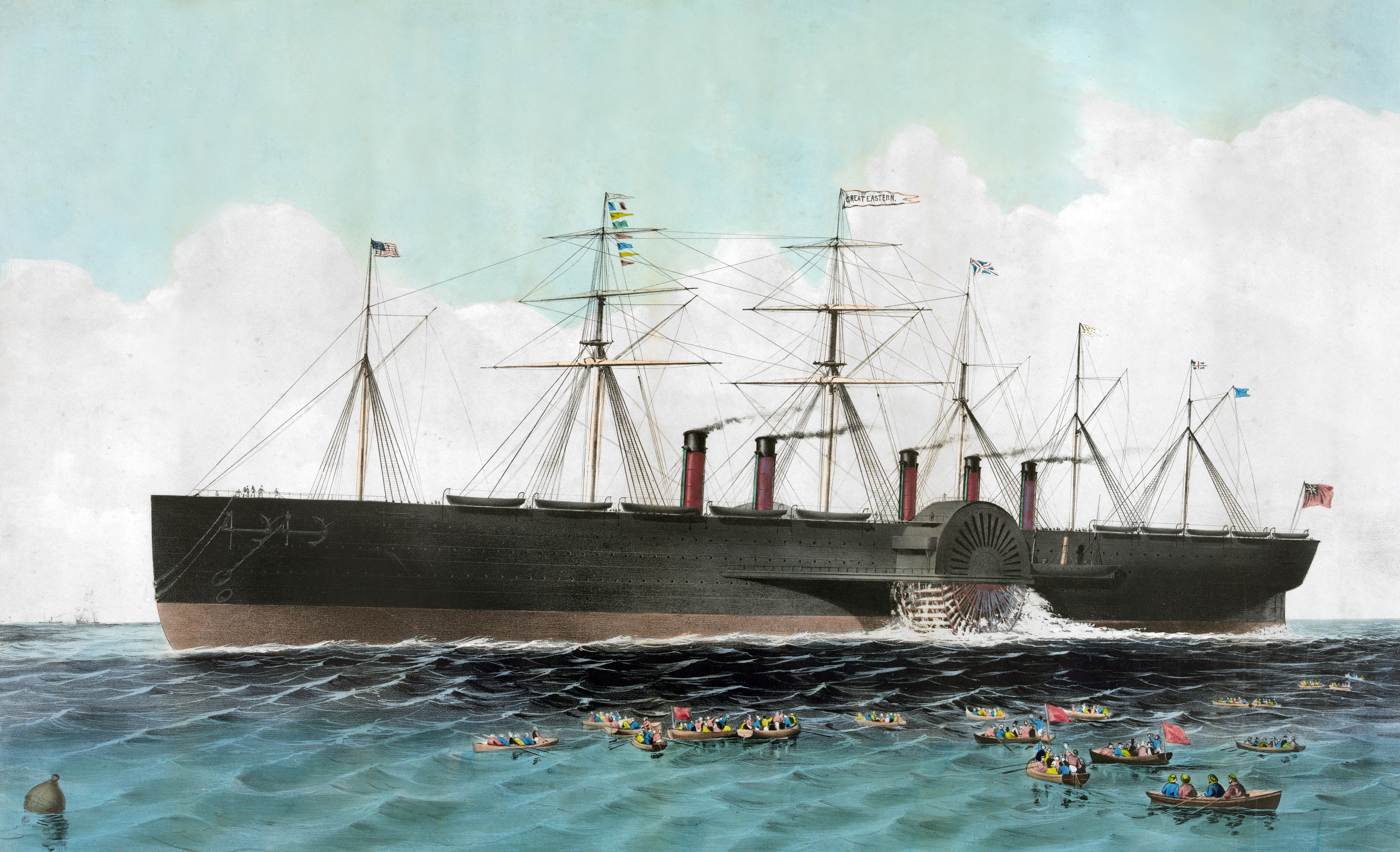
Hand-coloured lithograph of the Great Eastern, as imagined by the artist at her launch in 1858

Following her launch, Great Eastern spent a further eight months being fitted out. However, the cost of the fitting out ($600,000) concerned many investors, who had already spent nearly $6,000,000 constructing her. With the building company already in debt, cost-cutting measures were implemented; the ship was removed from Russell's shipyard, and many investors requested she be sold. As reported by the Times, one investor openly proposed that the ship be sold to the Royal Navy, noting if the navy employed Great Eastern as a ram, she would easily cleave through any warship afloat. These efforts had mixed success, with the ship eventually being sold to a new company for £800,000, equating to a loss of $3,000,000 for investors in the Eastern Steam Navigation Company. The new company modified parts of its predecessor's design, most notably cutting the ship's coal capacity as it intended to use the ship for the American market. Fitting out concluded in August 1859 and was marked with a lavish banquet for visitors (which included engineers, stockholders, members of Parliament, five earls, and other notables). In early September 1859, the ship sailed from her dock towards the channel, accompanied by many spectators. However, off Hastings she suffered a massive steam explosion (caused by a valve being left shut by accident after a pressure test of the system) that killed five crewmen and destroyed the forwardmost funnel. She proceeded to Portland Bill and then to Holyhead, though some investors claimed more money could have been made if the ship had remained as an "exhibition ship" for tourists in the Thames. Great Eastern successfully rode out the infamous Royal Charter Storm, after which it was moved to Southampton for the winter. The start of 1860 led to a further change of ownership when the owning company was found to be badly in debt and the value of the ship depreciated by half. This revelation forced the resignation of the board of directors, who were then replaced by a third group of controlling stockholders.

With the new board in place, the ship was recapitalized to raise an additional $50,000. The new board was determined to finish the ship, but also bet heavily on making large profits exhibiting the ship in North American seaports. To accomplish this, the company played major American and Canadian cities against each other, goading them into competition over which city would welcome Great Eastern; the city of Portland, Maine (with additional investment from the Grand Trunk Railway) went so far as to build a $125,000 pier to accommodate the ship. Ultimately New York City – which had quickly dredged a berth for her alongside a lumber wharf – was decided on as the ship's first destination.

=== 1860–1862: Early career ===
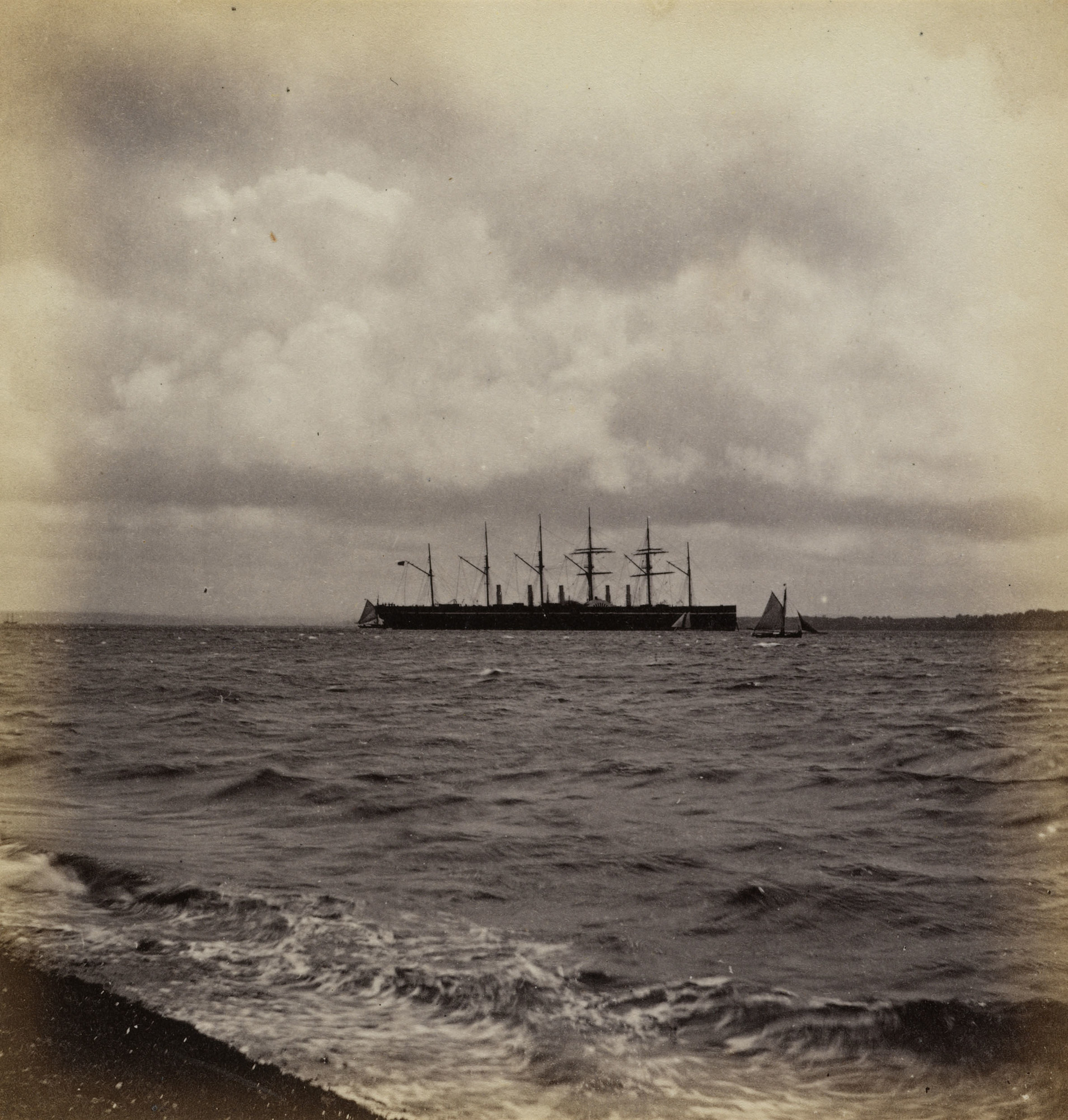
Great Eastern in Southampton, June 1860

After some delays, Great Eastern began her eleven-day maiden voyage on 17 June 1860 from Liverpool with 35 paying passengers, 8 company "dead heads" (passengers who do not pay) and 418 crew. Among the passengers were two journalists, Zerah Colburn and Alexander Lyman Holley. Her first crossing went without incident, and the ship's seaworthiness was proven again when she easily survived a small gale. Great Eastern arrived in New York on 28 June and was successfully docked, though she did damage part of a wharf. The ship was received with great aplomb, with many vessels and tens of thousands of people crowding to see her. In preparation for the crowds, the crew established a bar on deck, spread sand to soak up tobacco juice, and prepared to receive thousands of visitors. However, relations between the crew and New Yorkers began to sour – the public was outraged by the $1 entry fee (similar excursion trips in New York charged 25 cents) and many would-be visitors decided to forgo visiting the ship. Great Eastern left New York in late July, taking several hundred passengers on an excursion trip to Cape May and then to Old Point, Virginia. However, this too raised issues as the ship did not have enough provisions (a burst pipe in a storeroom had ruined much of the ship's food) to make the short trip comfortable, while her rudimentary bathrooms posed a sanitation issue. Duplicate tickets were sold for some berths, families were separated and remixed in improperly assigned cabins, and five plainclothes police officers (put on by New York Police Department to deter pickpockets) were discovered and chased into a livestock pen on deck. After reaching Virginia, the ship steamed back to New York, and from there sailed south again for an excursion cruise in the Chesapeake bay. The ship departed for Annapolis, where it was given 5,000 tons of coal by the Baltimore and Ohio Railroad. Great Eastern remained in Annapolis for several days, where she was toured by several thousand visitors and President James Buchanan. During the presidential visit, one member of the company board discussed sending the ship to Savannah to transport Southern cotton to English mills, but this idea was never followed up on.

Upon its second return to New York, the company decided to sail from the United States. From a financial perspective, the American venture had been a disaster; the ship had taken in only $120,000 against a $72,000 overhead, whereas the company had expected to take in $700,000. In addition, the company was facing a daily interest payment of $5,000, which ate into any profits the ship made. Hoping to net more profit before returning to Britain, the ship sailed from New York in mid August, bound for Halifax with 100 passengers. However, on approach to the port the ship was hailed by a local lighthouse service, which was empowered by law to collect a toll based on ship tonnage – given the size of the ship, the lighthouse levied a toll of $1,750 on Great Eastern. Infuriated by the size of the toll, a party went ashore to request that the toll be waived, but the governor of Halifax denied this request. Angered by the refusal, the captain and company leadership ordered the ship to return to Britain immediately, and as such no passengers or visitors were taken on in Halifax.

With the engineering success but financial failure of the 1860 trip, the ship's ownership company again attempted to turn Great Eastern profitable. During the winter of 1860, Scott Russell (who had recently won a $120,000 legal judgement against the ship company) refitted the ship and repaired damage sustained during its first year of operations; during the refit, she once broke free from her moorings and cut off the bowsprit of HMS Blenheim. She departed for New York in May 1861 (her other potential port, Baltimore, being now considered too risky because of the outbreak of the American Civil War), arriving in the port with little fanfare. Taking on a cargo of 5,000 tons of barrelled wheat and 194 passengers, she departed for Liverpool on 25 May, making an uneventful trip. Upon her return to Britain, it was announced that the ship's company had been contracted by the British War Office to transport 2,000 troops to Canada, part of a show of force to intimidate the rapidly-arming United States. After a further refit to carry troops, Great Eastern departed Britain for Quebec City carrying 2,144 soldiers, 473 passengers, and 122 horses; according to one source, this number of passengers – when coupled with Great Eastern's crew of 400 – marked the most number of people aboard a single ship to that point in history. The voyage was a success and the ship made it to Quebec, where it took two days for the city's steamers to ferry the passengers from the ship. The crossing was made in record-setting time, taking 8 days and 6 hours. Great Eastern's durable design was praised by the military officers aboard, but soon after her return to Britain the War Office discontinued the contract, and the ship returned to regular passenger service.

In September 1861, Great Eastern was caught in a major hurricane two days out of Liverpool. The ship was trapped in the storm for three days and suffered major damage to her propulsion systems; both her paddle wheels were torn off, her sails stripped away, and her rudder had been bent to 200 degrees and subsequently torn up by the ship's single propeller. A jury-rigged propeller was installed by Hamilton Towle (an American engineer returning from Austria), allowing the ship to steer for Ireland powered only by her screw. Arriving in Queenstown, (now Cobh), she was denied entry to the harbour as it was feared high winds would cause her to smash her anchorage; she was granted entry three days later and towed in by HMS Advice, tearing the anchor off an American merchant on her way to her berth. The only fatal casualty of the cruise occurred in port when a man was killed by backspin off the helm. Damage caused by the storm and lost revenue from the trip amounted to $300,000.

The ship continued a cycle of uneventful cruises, cargo loadings, and brief exhibitions from late 1861 to mid-1862. By July 1862, the ship was turning its first noteworthy profits, carrying 500 passengers and 8,000 tons of foodstuffs from New York to Liverpool, bringing in $225,000 in gross and requiring a turnaround of only 11 days. However, the ship's owners struggled to sustain this profitability as they were heavily focused on upper- and middle-class passenger service. As such, the ship was not used to transport large groups of immigrants travelling to the United States, nor did her transatlantic passages take full advantage of the major downturn in the American clipper industry during the American Civil War.

=== 1862–1884: Later career ===
==== Great Eastern Rock incident ====
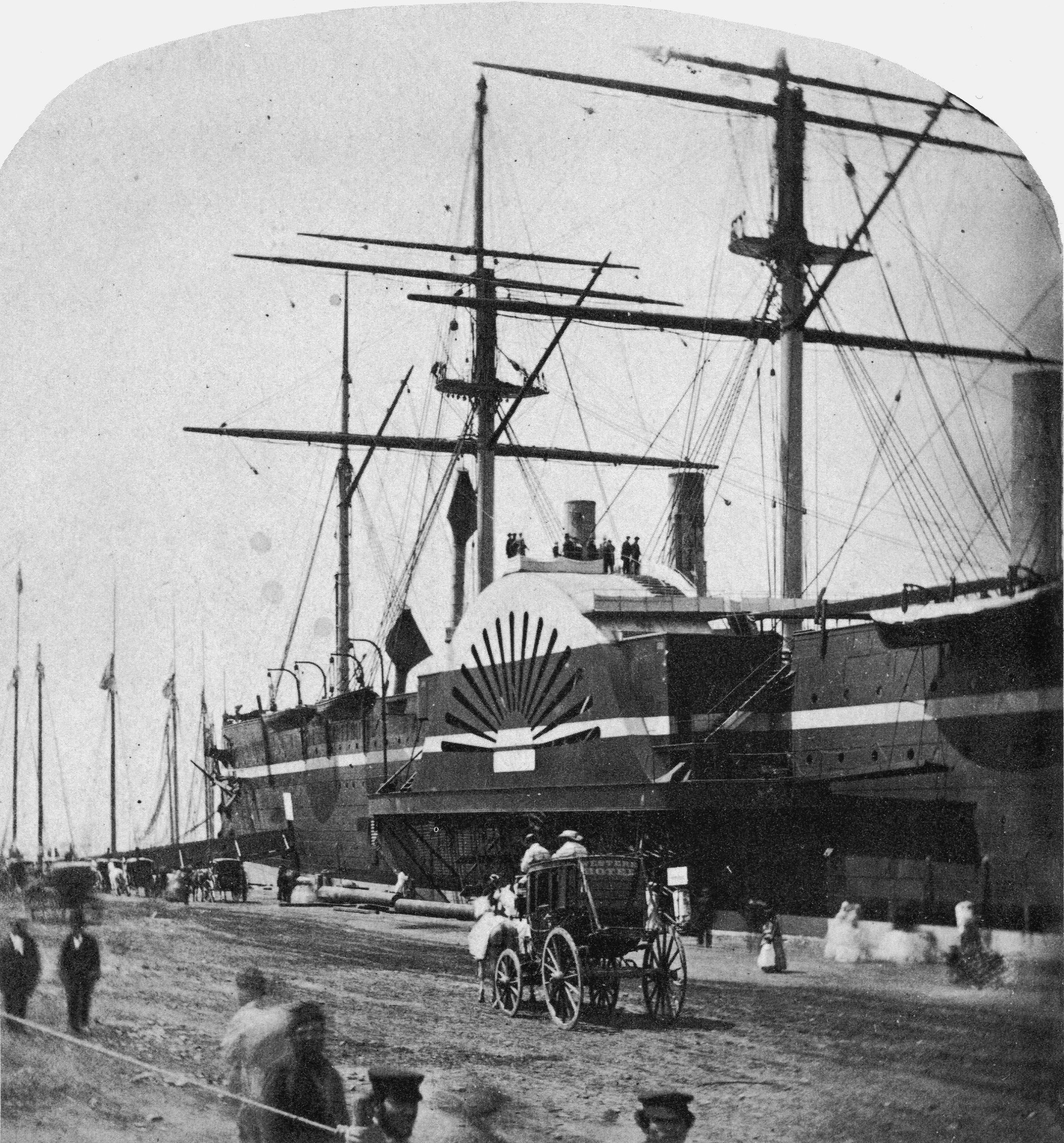
Berthed at New York, 1860

On 17 August 1862, Great Eastern departed from Liverpool for New York, carrying 820 passengers and several thousand tons of cargo – given the size of her load, she was drawing 9 metres (30 ft) of water. After outrunning a small squall, the ship approached the New York coast on the night of 27 August. Fearing that Great Eastern was resting too low in the water to pass by Sandy Hook, the ship's captain instead chose the nominally safer route through Long Island Sound. While passing by Montauk Point around 2:00 AM, the ship collided with an uncharted rock needle (later named Great Eastern Rock) that stood around 8 metres (26 ft) below the surface. The rock punctured the outer hull of the ship, leaving a gash 2.7 metres (9 ft) wide and 25 metres (83 ft) long – it was later calculated that the needle was large enough to contact the inner hull, but that the outer hull and strong transverse braces had prevented the inner hull from being breached. The collision was noticed by the crew, who guessed that the ship had struck a shifting sand shoal, and after a bilge check Great Eastern continued onto New York without incident. While in port, however, it was noticed that the ship had acquired a slight list to starboard, and so a diver was sent in to inspect the hull. After several days' inspection, the diver reported the large hole in the ship's outer hull, a major issue as no drydock in the world could fit the ship. The ship's hull was repaired by metalworkers in a cofferdam, but cost the company $350,000 and delayed the ship's return to Britain by several months. She would make one more trip to New York and back in 1863 before being laid up until 1864 due to her operating costs.

In January 1864, it was announced that the ship would be auctioned off. During the auction, four members of the company board of directors bid $125,000 for the ship and won it, thus acquiring personal control of the vessel. The group then allowed the ship company to go bankrupt, thus separating the ship from the now defunct shipping company and divesting many smaller stockholders. The ship was then contracted out to Cyrus West Field, an American financier, who intended to use it to lay underwater cables. The ship's owners developed a business model whereby they would rent out Great Eastern as a cable layer in exchange for shares in cable companies, ensuring that if Great Eastern succeeded in laying cables, the unprofitable ship could be personally lucrative for her owners.

==== Cable laying ====
In May 1865, Great Eastern steamed to Sheerness to take on wire for the laying of the Transatlantic telegraph cable. In return for using the ship, her owners wanted $250,000 in telegraph company stock, but only on the condition the wire laying succeeded. To accommodate the 22,450 kilometres (13,950 mi) of cable she was carrying, Great Eastern had some of her salons and rooms replaced with large tanks to hold the cable. In July the ship began laying the undersea cable near Valentia Island, gradually working her way west at a speed of 11 km/h (6 kn). The effort went relatively smoothly for several weeks, but the cable end was lost mid-Atlantic in an accident, forcing the ship to return in 1866 with a new line. The ship's first officer, Robert Halpin, managed to locate the lost cable end and the unbroken cable made it to shore in Heart's Content, Newfoundland on 27 July 1866.

Halpin became captain of Great Eastern, with the ship laying further cables. In early 1869 she laid a series of undersea cables near Brest. Later that year she was outfitted to lay undersea cables in the Indian Ocean; most of the operation's expenses were covered by the British government and banks in India, which hoped to circumvent the unreliable overland cables linking Britain to India. In preparation for operations in the hot climate, the ship was painted white to deflect heat away from the ship's cable tanks. Great Eastern departed from Britain in December 1869, arriving in Bombay (now Mumbai) 83 days later to lay her first cable anchor. Upon her arrival in port, Great Eastern's size generated considerable public interest, with the captain offering tickets to view the ship for 2 rupees apiece, distributing proceeds to the crew. Departing from Bombay before the onset of the Monsoon season, she proceeded north to lay a cable between Bombay and Aden. From Aden, she laid another cable to the island of Jabal al-Tair, where a second ship rendezvoused with her to take up the cable to Suez and then on to Alexandria.

==== Suez Canal concerns ====
The Suez Canal, which opened in 1869, was a setback for the ship, as at the time the channel was too shallow for Great Eastern to navigate. Going around Africa it would not be able to compete with ships that could use the canal. Ali Rischdi, a famed Arab navigator, proposed taking the ship through the canal, but this was never attempted.

=== 1885–1890: Break up ===
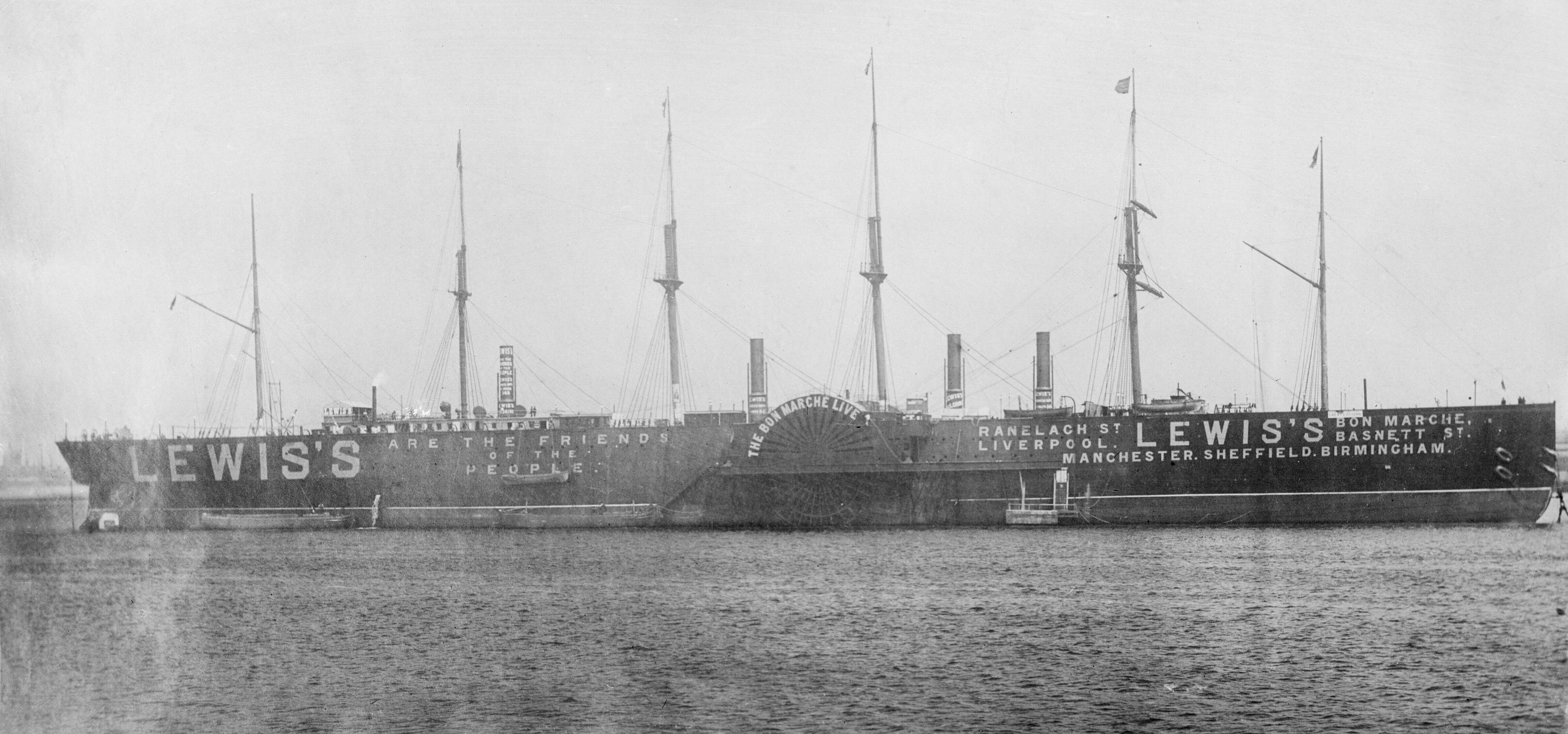
Great Eastern as a floating billboard for Lewis's Department Store in Liverpool, 1880s

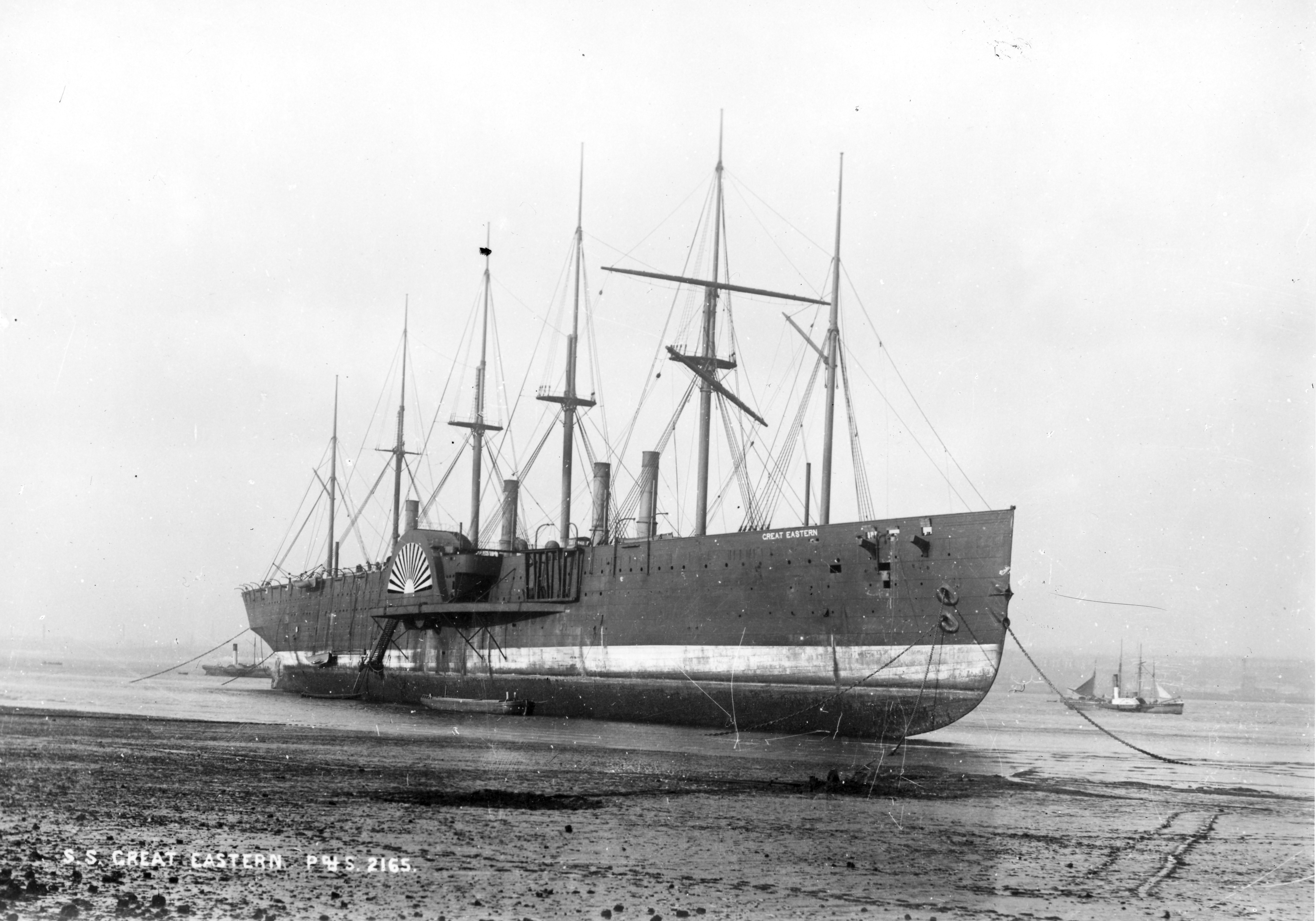
Great Eastern beached for breaking up

At the end of her cable-laying career – hastened by the launch of the CS Faraday, a ship purpose-built for cable laying – she was refitted as a liner, but once again efforts to make her a commercial success failed. She remained moored in Milford Harbour for some time, annoying the Milford harbour board, which wanted to build dockyards in the area. Many proposals for the ship were raised; according to one source, pubs were full of talk of filling her with gunpowder and blowing her up. The ship was ultimately saved, however, as a dock engineer (Frederick Appleby) was able to build a dock around her, using the ship's massive hulk as a station for driving pylons. During her 11 years moored in Milford, she accrued a large amount of biofouling on her hull. Early marine naturalist Henry Lee (best known at the time for his skepticism towards sea monsters) conducted an extensive study of her hull, calculating she had ~300 tons of marine life attached to her. She was sold at auction, at Lloyd's on 4 November 1885, by order of the Court of Chancery. Bidding commenced at £10,000, rising to £26,200 and sold to Mr Mattos, a city merchant.

Sold again, she was used as a showboat, a floating palace/concert hall and gymnasium. She later acted as an advertising hoarding – sailing up and down the Mersey for Lewis's Department Store, who at this point were her owners, before being sold. The idea was to attract people to the store by using her as a floating visitor attraction. In 1886 she was sailed to Liverpool for the Liverpool Exhibition of 1886 – during the transit, she struck and badly damaged one of her tugs, the last of 10 ships she would damage or sink. On 10 May 1887, the steamship G. E. Wood collided with her in the Mersey. Sold again after the exhibition, one company considered using her to raise shallow shipwrecks, while one humorist suggested that Great Eastern be used to help dig the Panama canal by ramming her into the isthmus. She was, again, sold at auction in 1888, fetching £16,000 for her value as scrap. Many pieces of the ship were bought by private collectors, former passengers, and friends of the crew – various fixtures, lamps, furniture, paneling, and other artifacts were kept. Parts of Great Eastern were repurposed for other uses; one ferry company converted her wood paneling into a public house bar, while one mistress at a Lancashire boarding school acquired the ship's deck caboose for use as a children's playhouse.

An early example of breaking-up a structure by use of a wrecking ball, she was scrapped near the Sloyne, at New Ferry on the River Mersey by Henry Bath & Son Ltd in 1889–1890—it took 18 months to take her apart, with her double hull being particularly difficult to salvage. The breaking of the ship caused a minor labour dispute as workers – who were paid by the ton of ship scrapped – became frustrated with the slow pace of breaking and went on strike.

==== Trapped worker legend ====
After Great Eastern's scrapping, rumours spread that the shipbreakers had found the remains of trapped worker(s) entombed in her double hull—likely inspired by tales spread by her crew of a phantom riveter who had been sealed in the ship's hull. The legend was first widely noted on by James Dugan in 1952, who quoted a letter from a Captain David Duff, and many later sources cite Dugan's work. Other authors, notably L. T. C. Rolt in his biography of Brunel, have dismissed the claim (noting such a discovery would have been recorded in company logs and received press attention), but the legend has become widely mentioned in books and articles about nautical ghost stories. In London and Londoners in the Eighteen-Fifties and Sixties, Alfred Rosling Bennett writes about the skeleton that "it was then remembered that while on the stocks building a pay-clerk had disappeared with a large sum of money... and was supposed to have fled with it", and questions if the remains could have been deposited by workmen who had murdered the man. Brian Dunning wrote about the legend in 2020, noting that while it was technically impossible to prove or disprove, the incident could not have happened given the lack of evidence being found during the numerous times Great Eastern was being repaired. This legend is also mentioned in the song "Ballad Of The Great Eastern", released by Sting in 2013.

==== Surviving parts ====
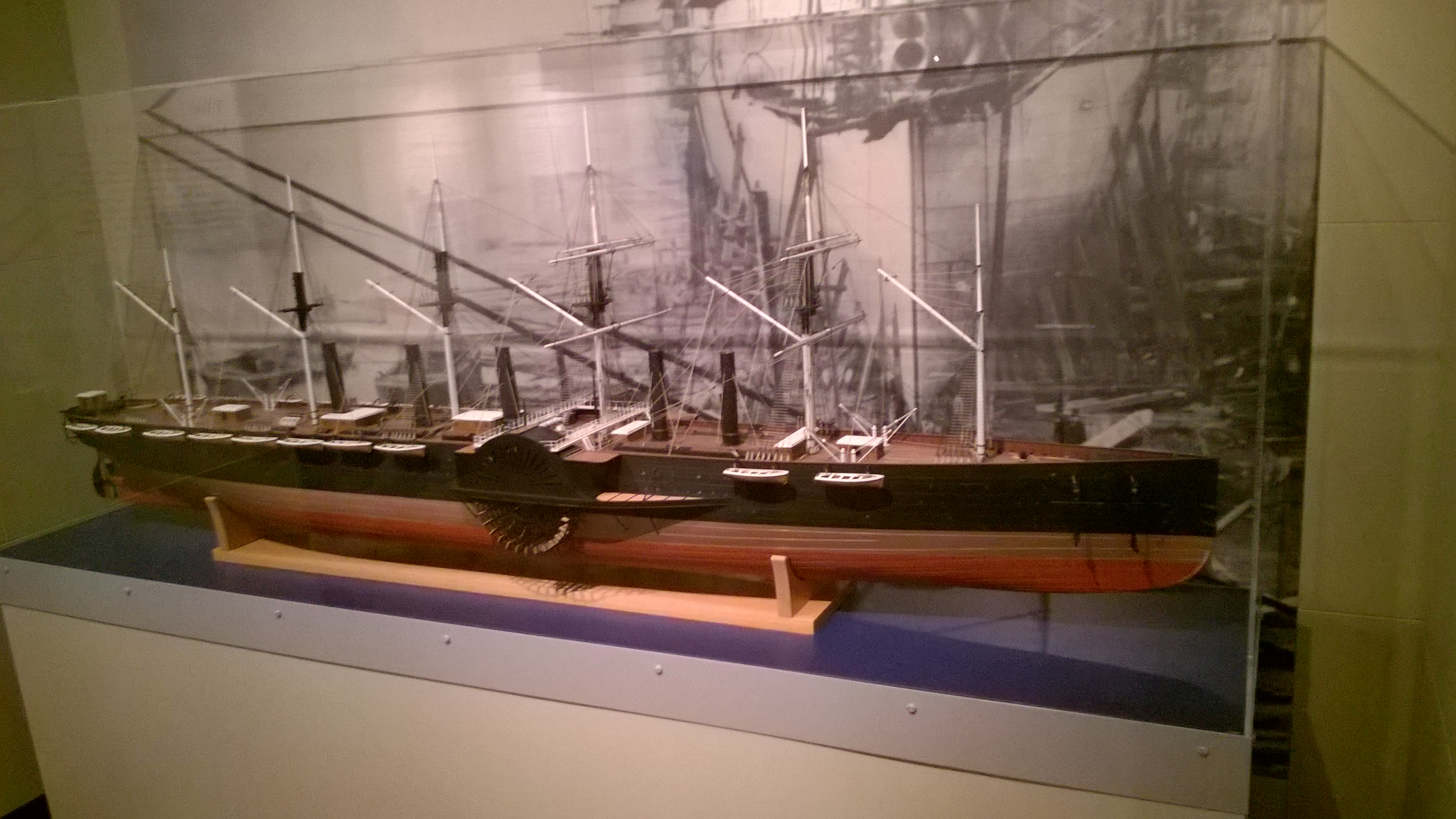
Model of Great Eastern in the Museum of London Docklands

Football historian Stephen Kelly states that in 1928, Liverpool Football Club were looking for a flagpole for their Anfield ground, and consequently purchased her top mast. However, further investigation by local journalist Simon Weedy has shown that the mast was originally moved there by Everton F.C., prior to their departure from Anfield in 1892. It still stands there today at the Kop end. In 2011, the Channel 4 programme Time Team found geophysical survey evidence to suggest that residual iron parts from the ship's keel and lower structure still reside in the foreshore.

During 1859, when Great Eastern was off Portland conducting trials, an explosion aboard blew off one of the funnels. The funnel was salvaged and subsequently purchased by the water company supplying Weymouth and Melcombe Regis in Dorset, UK, and used as a filtering device. It was later transferred to the Bristol Maritime Museum close to Brunel's SS Great Britain then moved to the SS Great Britain Museum.

In October 2007, the recovery of a 6,500-pound (2.9 t) anchor in 70 feet (21 m) of water about four miles (6.4 km) from Great Eastern Rock stirred speculation that it may have belonged to Great Eastern.

== In popular culture ==
- Great Eastern is the subject of the Sting song, "Ballad of the Great Eastern" from the 2013 album The Last Ship.
- The history of Great Eastern is chronicled in detail in James Dugan's non-fiction book The Great Iron Ship.
- An Atlantic crossing on Great Eastern is the backdrop to Jules Verne's 1871 novel A Floating City
- The 1867 ten-day maiden trip from Liverpool to New York forms the backdrop of the posthumously published eight-volume erotic novel, The Great Eastern, by the Greek writer Andreas Embirikos
- Great Eastern and its creator Isambard Kingdom Brunel are central to Howard A. Rodman's 2019 novel The Great Eastern, in which Captain Ahab is pitted against Captain Nemo.
- The Great Eastern was the name of a radio comedy show on CBC Radio One from 1994 to 1999, named for the steamship.
- In the trade management video game Anno 1800, released in 2019 by Ubisoft, the player has the opportunity to construct Great Eastern as an addition to their naval fleet. Great Eastern has the largest cargo capacity of any ship in the game with a total of eight cargo slots.
- In China Miéville's fantasy stories set in Bas-Lag, the pirate city of Armada contains a ship named The Grand Easterly, based on SS Great Eastern.
- The launching of the ship, Brunel's illness & subsequent death feature as the initial setup for the 2019 novel The Great London Conspiracy by Jordan Mooney.

== Gallery ==
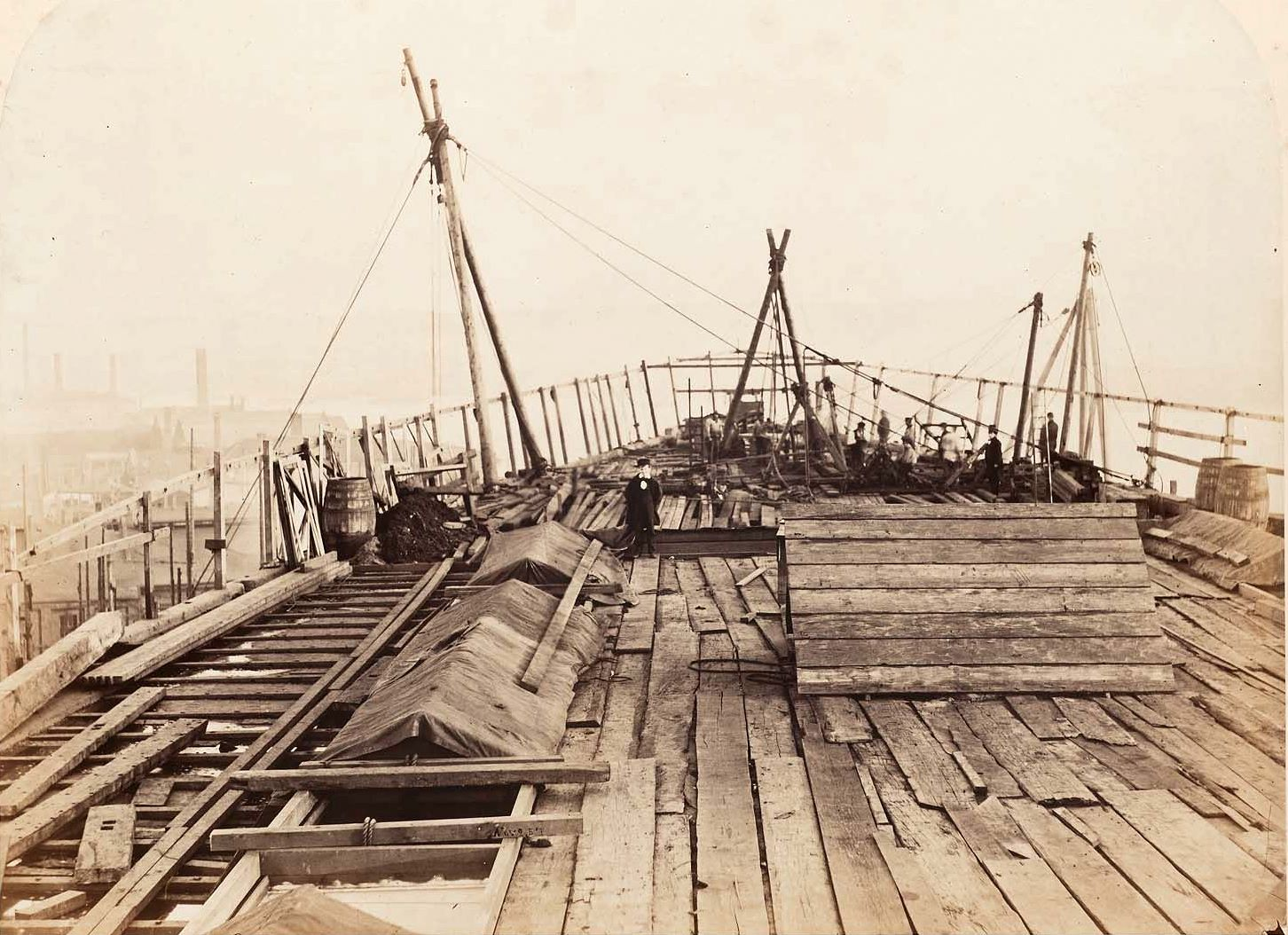
On the deck, 1857

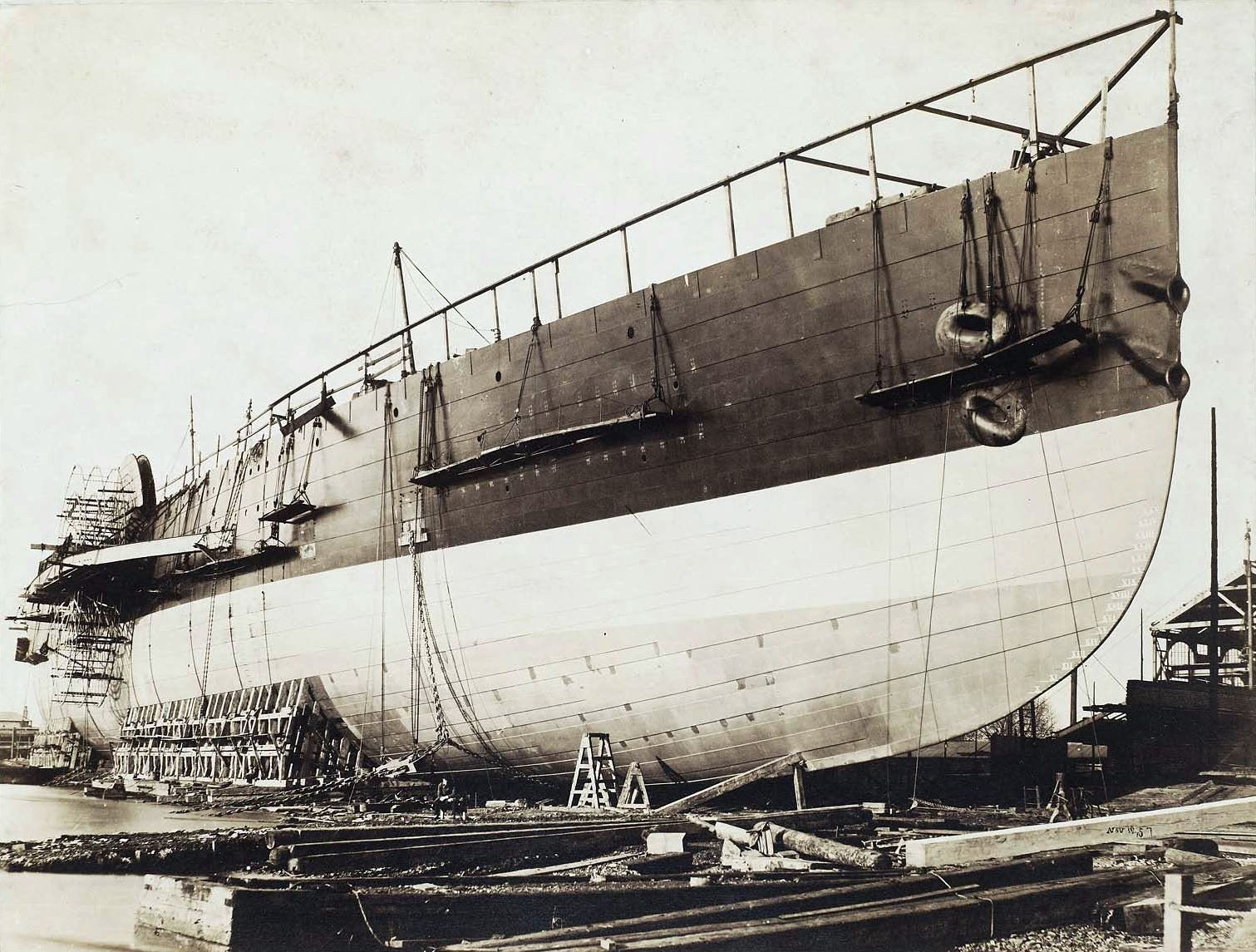
Great Eastern,
12 November 1857

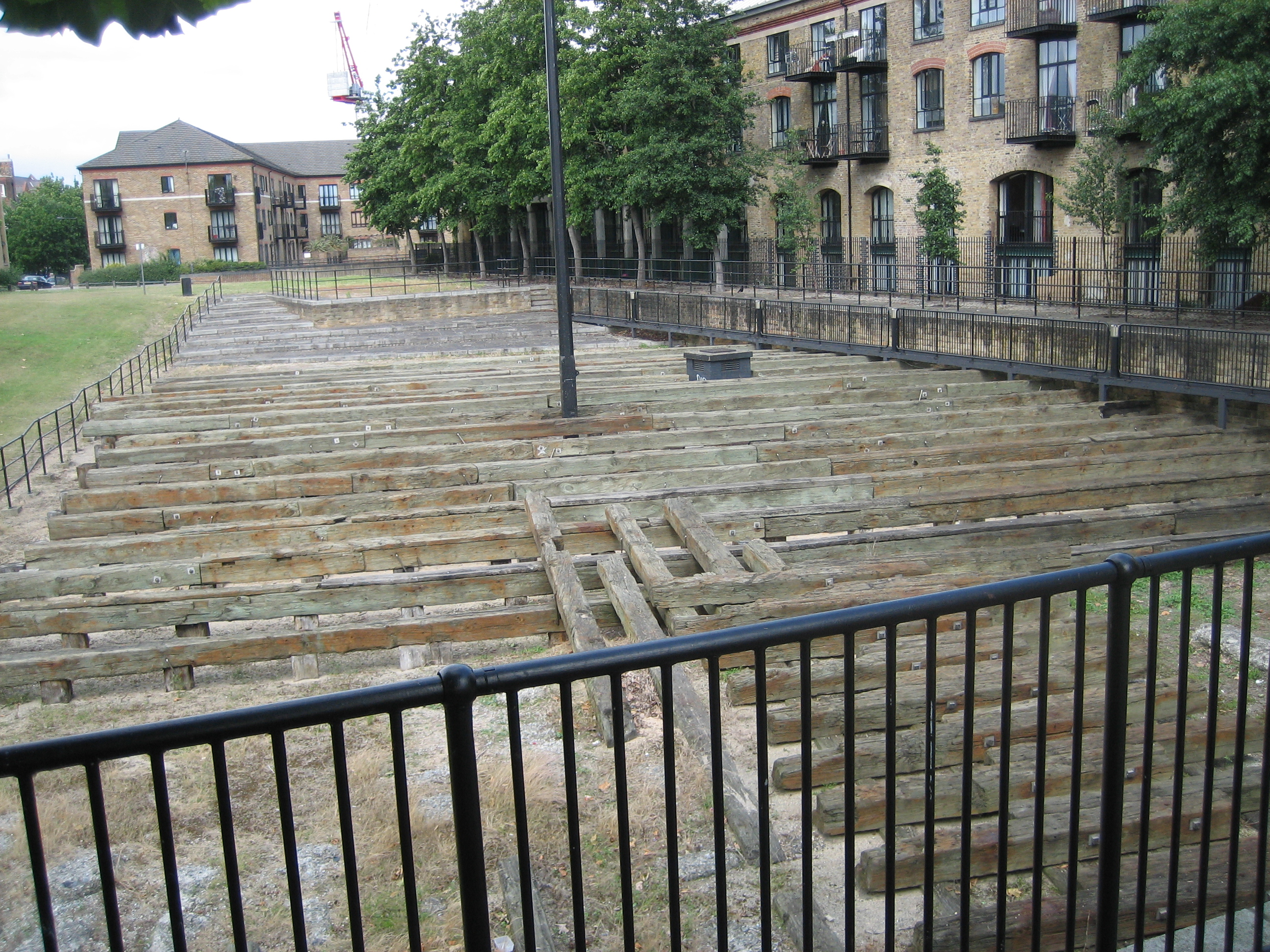
SS Great Eastern's launch ramp at Millwall

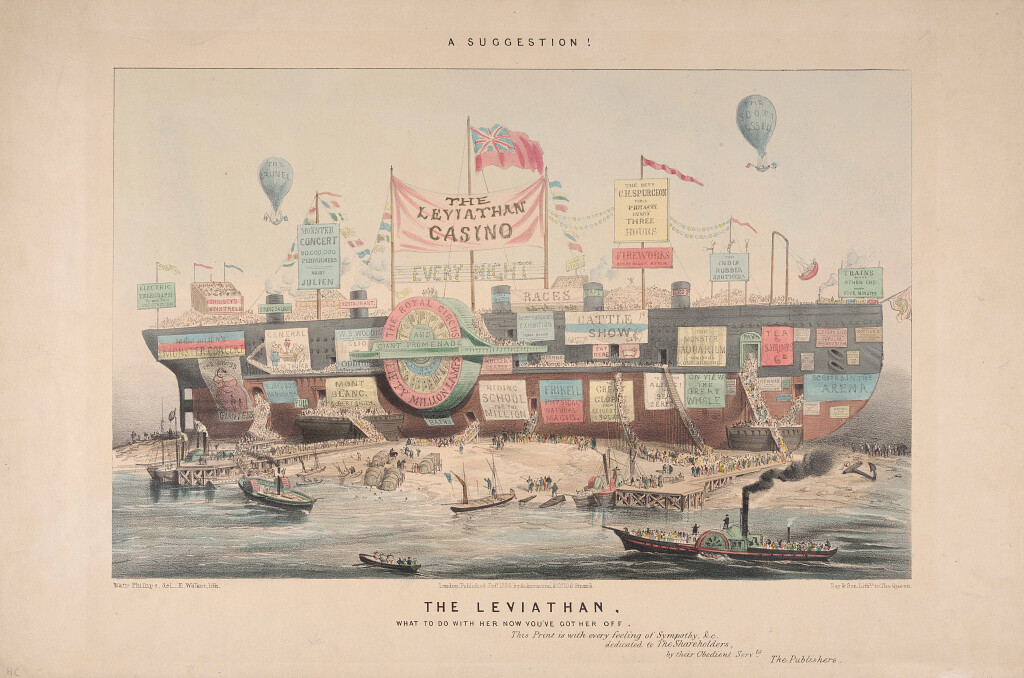
Print referring to the difficulty of trying to launch Great Eastern. The Mariners' Museum

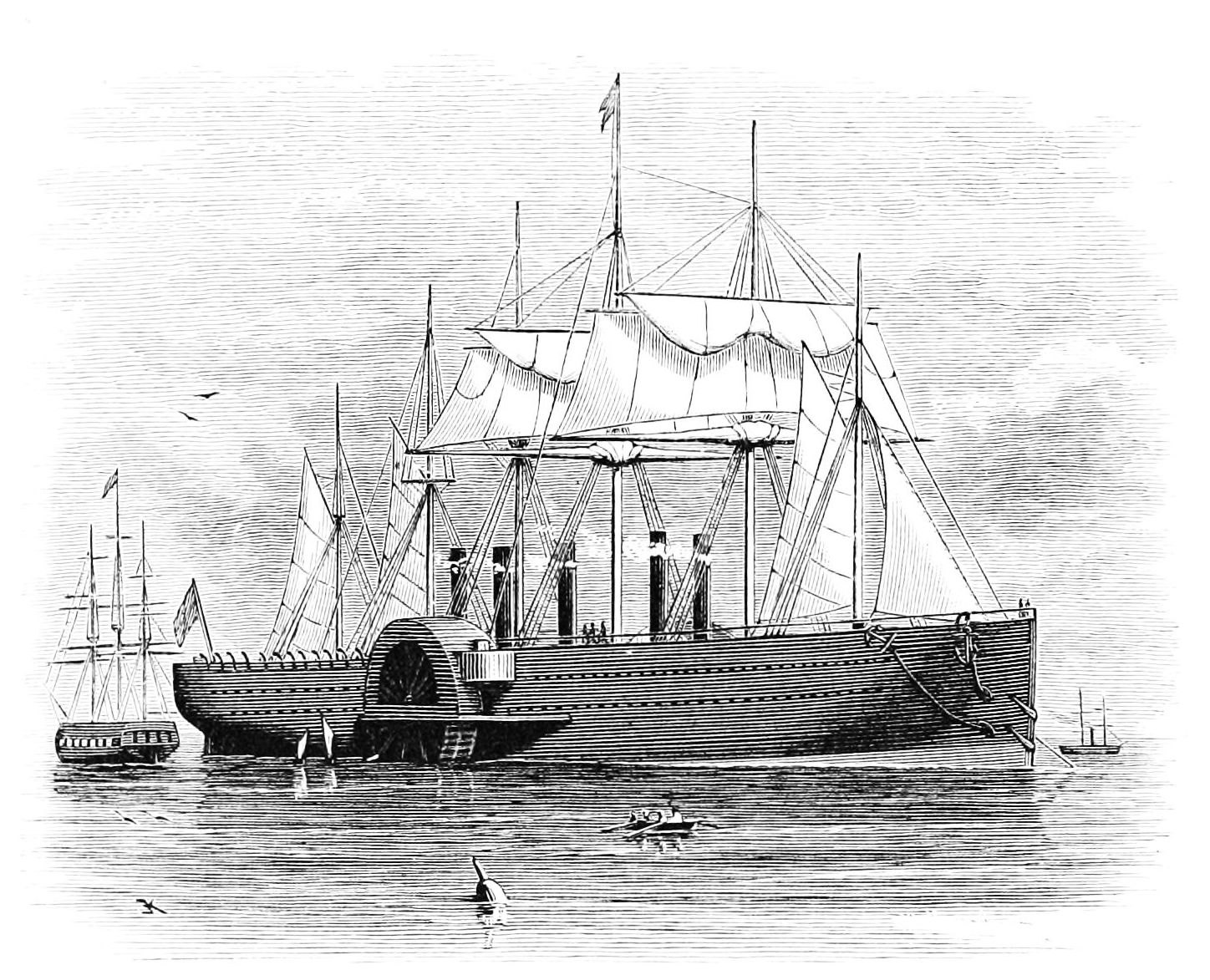
Magazine illustration ca. 1877

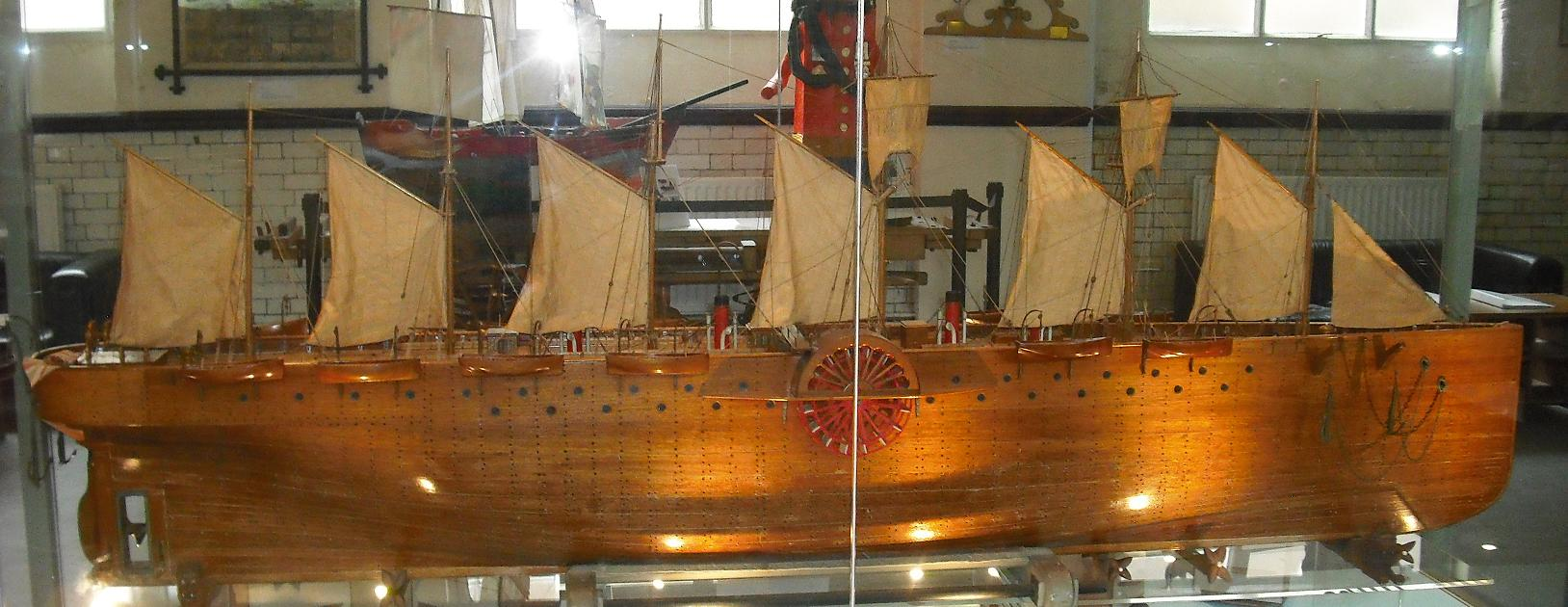
James Henry Pullen's model of SS Great Eastern

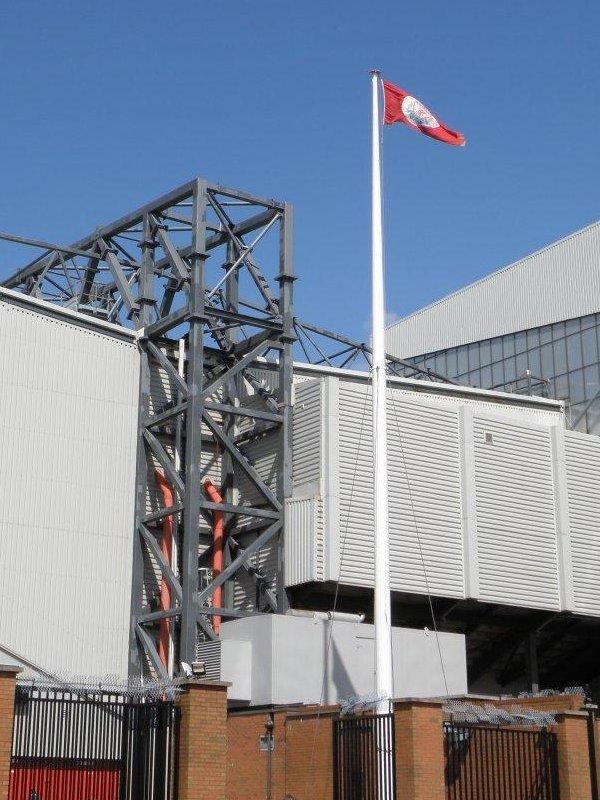
A topmast salvaged from Great Eastern at the Kop end of Anfield, the home stadium of Liverpool F.C.

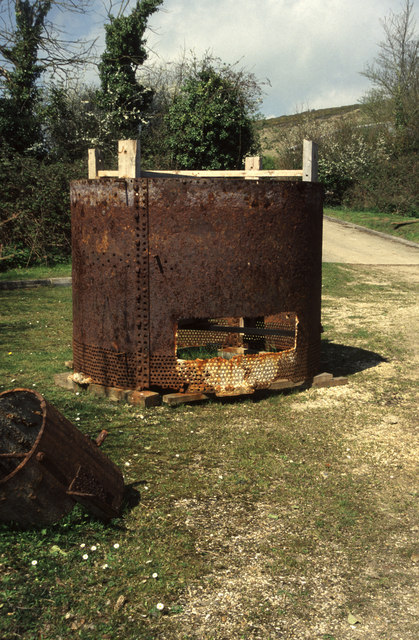
Part of a funnel from SS Great Eastern. SS Great Britain Museum, Bristol

== See also ==
- James Henry Pullen's model of SS Great Eastern
- Steering engine – Great Eastern was the first ship so equipped
- Transatlantic telegraph cable
- Robert Halpin, commanded the SS Great Eastern when a cable layer
- List of large sailing vessels
