= E. R. C. Brinkworth =

Edwin Robert Courtney Brinkworth (28 September 1901 – 1978) was a historian of central England and historical writer who produced three books on the history of Banbury, Oxfordshire.

== Early life ==
Brinkworth was born in Bath, Somerset, on 28 September 1901 to Edwin James Brinkworth and his wife Alice Maude Brinkworth, both school teachers. He had a younger brother, Leonard George Brinkworth.

== Career ==
Brinkworth's first historical work was the edited version of the Episcopal visitation book for the Archdeaconry of Buckingham, 1662, produced in association with the Buckinghamshire Record Society in 1947. In 1958 he produced Old Banbury: A Short Popular History which was published by the Banbury Historical Society.

== Death ==
Brinkworth died in Banbury in 1978.

== Selected publications ==
- Episcopal visitation book for the Archdeaconry of Buckingham, 1662. Buckinghamshire Record Society, Buckingham, 1947. (Editor)
- Old Banbury: A Short Popular History. Banbury Historical Society, 1958.
- Shakespeare and the Bawdy Court of Stratford. Phillimore, London, 1972. ISBN 0900592826
- New Light on the Life of Shakespeare. Oxford, 1975.
- Banbury Wills and Inventories Part Two 1621-1650. Banbury Historical Society, Banbury, 1976. (Edited with J.S.W. Gibson) ISBN 090012914X
- Banbury Corporation Records: Tudor and Stuart/Calendared, Abstracted and Edited & c. Banbury Historical Society, Banbury, 1977. (Edited with J.S.W. Gibson) ISBN 0900129158
