= Richmond Opera =

- Choir
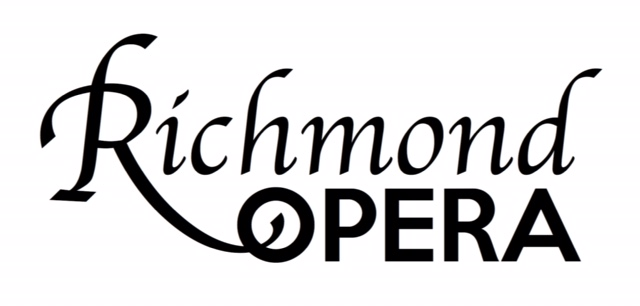
- Richmond Opera logo
- Origin: Isleworth, England, United Kingdom
- Founded: 2004
- Genre: Opera
- Music director: Helena Brown (2002–2012); Leslie A. Lewis (2012–2013); Janet Oates (2014); Lindsay Bramley (from 2015)
- Website: richmondopera.org.uk

Richmond Opera is an opera company based in Richmond, London in the UK. Originally founded as Isleworth Baroque in 2004, Richmond Opera performs a fully-staged opera each year at the Normansfield Theatre in Teddington, along with concerts, semi-staged productions, and workshops.

== Beginnings ==
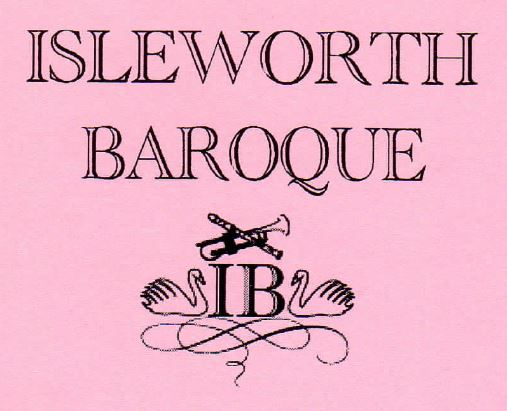
The original Isleworth Baroque logo

Richmond Opera was founded as Isleworth Baroque by Helena Brown (1948–2012), then a harpsichordist with the English Chamber Orchestra and the Academy of St Martin in the Fields. In 2002 Brown gathered together singers and musicians, many from an adult education class run by Hounslow London Borough Council, to perform Handel's Acis and Galatea. Staged in the conservatory of Syon House in Isleworth, the performers competed with the sounds of heavy rain (the roof leaked), low-flying aircraft, and the cries of peacocks in the surrounding grounds. Nonetheless in 2003 they went on to stage Purcell's The Faerie Queen. From these roots and with some initial funding from Hounslow London Borough Council, Isleworth Baroque was formed in 2004. The society continued to perform regularly and give workshops on Baroque Opera, incorporating Baroque music and elements of Baroque dance.

== 2002 to 2012 ==
Richmond Opera, then known as Isleworth Baroque, was led by Helena Brown until her death in 2012. Unusually for a Baroque Music group, Brown had the instruments play at Modern Concert Pitch (A=440) rather than at Baroque Pitch (A=415) to encourage musicians from outside the baroque tradition to take part. Janet Oates, now a composer, choir master and professional singer, took part in Isleworth Baroque's first production and remained with the company as a soloist, musician, and director for 15 years. Isleworth Baroque gave performances of Purcell's Dido and Aeneas in 2006 and Cavalli's La Calisto in 2007 which received positive reviews. Actor Stan Streather joined the company and performed solo roles from 2008 to 2011, as did singer Rosalind O'Dowd who went on to co-found Ormond Opera. Emerita Professor of Music Education Lucy Green joined Isleworth Baroque in 2009, initially as a singer and later directing several productions. A 2012 production of Lampe's Dragon of Wantley featured tenor William Morgan, now a soloist with the English National Opera.

== 2013 onwards ==
From 2013 through 2014 Isleworth Baroque continued under the musical stewardship of American conductor and coordinator of University of Roehampton Music Leslie Anne Lewis and Janet Oates. In 2014 the company gave the premiere performance of an oratorio, Lilith, which had been composed by Oates. Isleworth Baroque then switched to performing at Baroque Pitch (A=415) to encourage musicians with specialist baroque instruments to take part. Singer, conductor and librettist Lindsay Bramley was appointed as musical director in 2015. In 2016 Bramley expanded Isleworth Baroque's purview with performances of Gilbert and Sullivan's Trial by Jury and Mozart's The Magic Flute. In the same year the society changed its name to Richmond Opera to reflect a broader approach to repertoire and a shift in the location of most of the company's activities to the London Borough of Richmond upon Thames.

== Ethos ==
Richmond Opera's charitable objects focus on inclusivity for audience and performers at all levels. The company has a history of working with female music directors and theatre directors.

== Affiliations ==
Richmond Opera is a member of Making Music, the National Federation of Music Societies, and also of Arts Richmond, an independent charity supporting arts and culture in the London Borough of Richmond upon Thames.

Richmond Opera is a registered charity in England and Wales. Its charitable objects are:

(a) to promote public education in, and appreciation of, baroque music (particularly baroque opera) through public concerts, study days and full-scale productions; and

(b) to encourage and provide an opportunity for amateur musicians to develop through participation in the performance and enjoyment of live performances of baroque music."

Richmond Opera is not formally connected with an organisation of the same name which existed in the London area from 1972 to 1988.
