= Royal Earlswood Hospital =

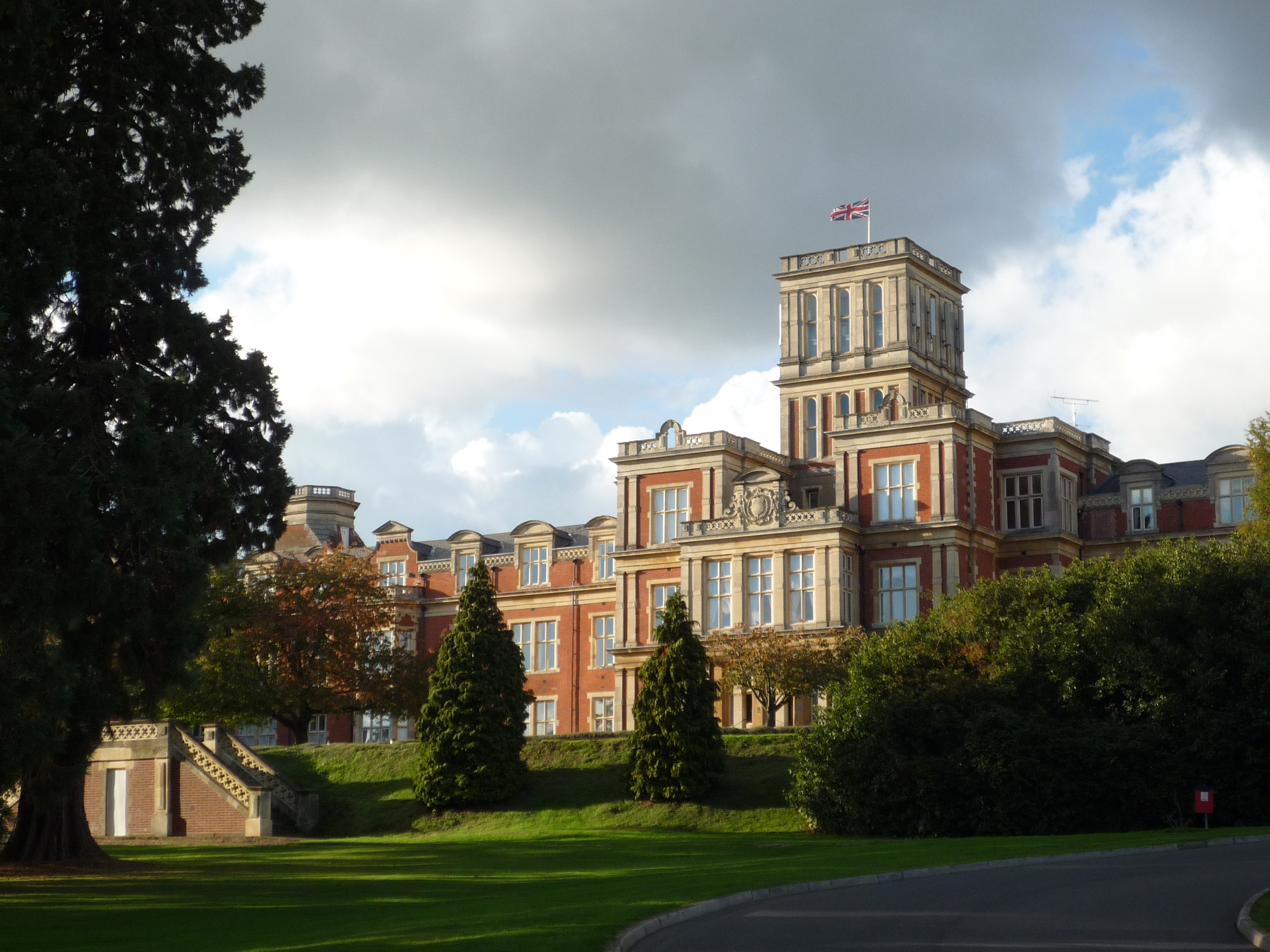
- The main building, now called Victoria Court

- Shown in Surrey

Geography
- Location: Redhill, Surrey, England
- Coordinates: 51°13′22″N 00°10′01″W

Organisation
- Care system: NHS
- Type: Mental health

History
- Founded: 1847; 179 years ago
- Closed: 1997; 29 years ago

Links
- Lists: Hospitals in England

The Royal Earlswood Hospital, formerly The Asylum for Idiots and The Royal Earlswood Institution for Mental Defectives, in Redhill, Surrey, was the first establishment to cater specifically for people with developmental disabilities. Previously they had been housed either in asylums for the mentally ill or in workhouses.

== History ==
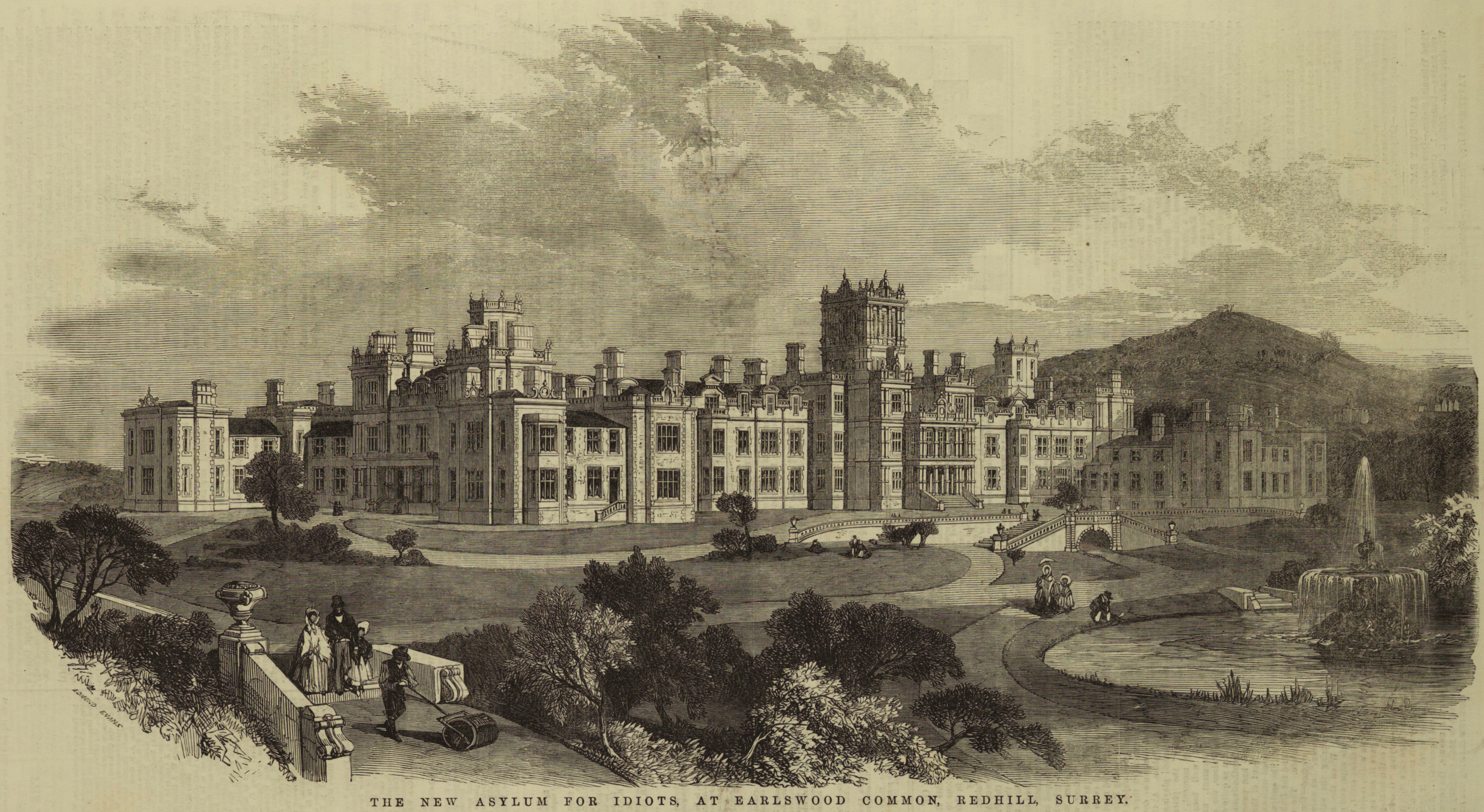
Royal Earlswood Hospital about 1854

In 1847, Ann Serena Plumbe took an interest in the plight of those with neurodevelopmental disabilities, or "idiots" as they were termed at the time, and began to discuss what could be done to assist them. In discussion with Dr John Conolly (of the Hanwell Asylum) and Rev Dr Andrew Reed (a philanthropist and founder of several orphanages) they determined to educate such people. Reed toured Europe to gather information on institutions serving the purpose and in October the project to found The Asylum for Idiots, as it was originally called, began with the appointment of a board of management.

A property known as Park House in Highgate was purchased in March 1848 and the first patients were admitted in April 1848, including a 13 year-old Andrew Reed Plumbe. The building quickly proved too small, so in 1850 an 155-acre site was purchased at Earlswood Common, near Redhill, and a public appeal launched to raise funds for the building of a model 'Asylum for Idiots' to house 400 residents. Queen Victoria subscribed 250 guineas in the name of the Prince of Wales who became a life member. The hospital was designed by William Bonython Moffat and built by John Jay. Prince Albert took a special interest from the beginning. He laid the foundation stone in June 1853 and opened the Asylum in June 1855. In 1862 Queen Victoria conferred a Royal charter on the asylum. One notable inmate in the early years of the asylum was artist James Henry Pullen (1835–1916).

John Langdon Down (after whom Down's syndrome was named) was medical superintendent of the hospital from 1855 to 1868. At this time patients slept in fifteen-bed dormitories and there was one member of staff to each seven patients. Tuberculosis accounted for the majority of deaths in the institution. Two new wings were completed in 1873. Andrew Reed Plumbe remained at Earlswood until his death in 1881, aged 45.

The asylum was renamed The Royal Earlswood Institution for Mental Defectives in June 1926. Nerissa and Katherine Bowes-Lyon, who were nieces of the Queen Mother and first cousins of Elizabeth II, were placed in the hospital in 1941. The hospital joined the National Health Service in 1948.

Following the introduction of Care in the Community, the hospital went into a period of decline and closed in March 1997. The site was redeveloped for residential use and is now known as Royal Earlswood Park.

A number of the buildings are listed: these include the main building, the workshop and the gate lodges.

== The Royal Earlswood Museum ==
The Royal Earlswood Museum was located at the Belfry Shopping Centre nearby in Redhill. It illustrated the history and development of the asylum and contained works by former inmate, James Henry Pullen. The museum is now closed and in 2012 its collections and artefacts were donated to the Langdon Down Museum of Learning Disability in Teddington, Richmond upon Thames. The museum's archives are located in the Surrey History Centre in Woking.
