= Buckinghamshire Record Society =

Text publication society

Buckinghamshire Record Society logo

The Buckinghamshire Record Society is a text publication society for the county of Buckinghamshire in England. It was established in 1947 when it was separated from the Buckinghamshire Archaeological Society. The society is a registered charity.

== Selected publications ==
Publications of the society include:

=== Main series ===
- Vol. 1 The Minute Book of the Monthly Meeting of the Society of Friends for the Upperside of Buckinghamshire, 1669-1690 (1937)
- Vol. 2 The Cartulary of Missenden Abbey, Part 1 (1938)
- Vol. 3 Early Buckinghamshire Charters
- Vol. 4 A Calendar of the Feet of Fines for the County of Buckingham, 7 Richard I to 44 Henry III
- Vol. 5 A Calendar of Deeds preserved in the Museum at Aylesbury
- Vol. 6 Calendar of the Roll of the Justices on Eyre, 1227
- Vol. 7 Episcopal Visitation Book for the Archdeaconry of Buckingham, 1662
- Vol. 8 Subsidy Roll for the County of Buckingham Anno 1524
- Vol. 9 The Cartulary of Snelshall Priory
- Vol. 10 The Cartulary of Missenden Abbey, Part 2
- Vol. 11 The First Ledger Book of High Wycombe and Borough of High Wycombe: Second Ledger Book, 1684-1770
- Vol. 12 The Cartulary of Missenden Abbey, Part 3
- Vol. 13 Ship Money Papers and Richard Grenville's Note-Book
- Vol. 14 Early Taxation Returns. Taxation of Personal Property in 1332 and later
- Vol. 15 Luffield Priory Charters, Part 1
- Vol. 16 The Letter-Books of Samuel Wilberforce, 1843-68
- Vol. 17 The Certificate of Musters for Buckinghamshire in 1522
- Vol. 18 Luffield Priory Charters, Part 2
- Vol. 19 The Courts of the Archdeaconry of Buckingham, 1483-1523
- Vol. 20 The Letters of Thomas Hayton, Vicar of Long Crendon, 1821-1887
- Vol. 21 Buckinghamshire Contributions for Ireland, 1642, and Richard Grenville's Military Accounts, 1642-1645
- Vol. 22 The Buckinghamshire Posse Comitatus 1798
- Vol. 23 The Autobiography of Joseph Mayett of Quainton (1783-1839)
- Vol. 24 Buckinghamshire Probate Inventories, 1661-1714
- Vol. 25 A Calendar of the Feet of Fines for Buckinghamshire, 1259-1307, with an appendix, 1179-1259
- Vol. 26 Descriptions of Lord Cobham's Gardens at Stowe, 1700-1750
- Vol. 27 Buckinghamshire Returns of the Census of Religious Worship, 1851
- Vol. 28 Buckinghamshire Dissent and Parish Life, 1669-1712
- Vol. 29 Inquests and Indictments from Late Fourteenth Century Buckinghamshire
- Vol. 30 Buckinghamshire Glebe Terriers, 1578-1640
- Vol. 31 Recollections of Nineteenth Century Buckinghamshire
- Vol. 32 Index to Probate Records of the Archdeaconry Court of Buckingham, 1483-1660, and of the Buckinghamshire Peculiars, 1420-1660
- Vol. 33 The Household Book (1510-1551) of Sir Edward Don of Horsenden
- Vol. 34 The Buckinghamshire Eyre of 1286
- Vol. 35 The Winslow Manor Court Books, Part I, 1327-1377, and Part II, 1423-1460

== See also ==
- Centre for Buckinghamshire Studies
