= Normansfield Theatre =

Theatre building in Teddington, England

Coordinates: 51°25′06″N 0°18′54″W

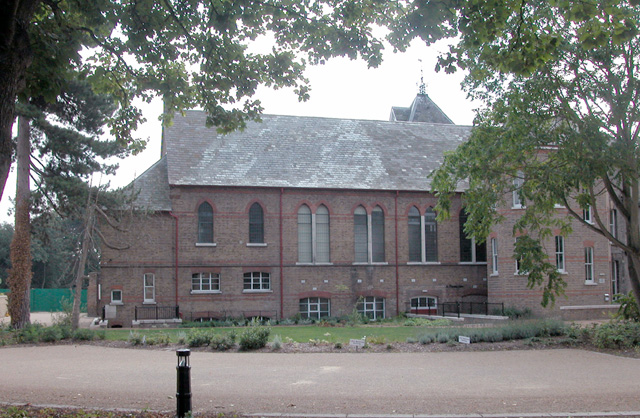
Normansfield Theatre exterior

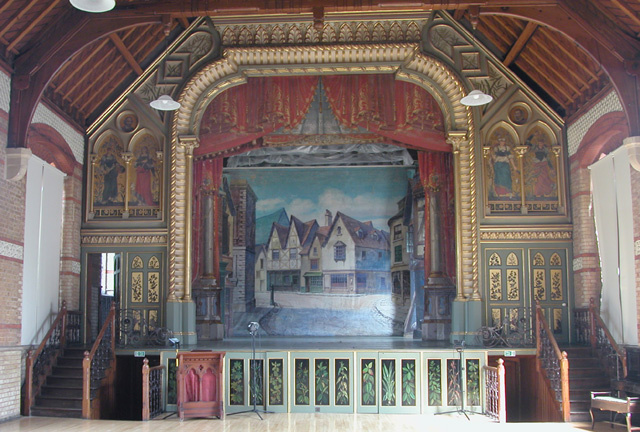
Stage of the theatre

The Normansfield Theatre is a Victorian era building in Teddington, England.

The theatre is on the site of Normansfield Hospital, which was a self-sufficient Victorian hospital complex run by Dr. John Langdon Down. The hospital was where he conducted the pioneering research into the syndrome now known as Down syndrome. The theatre was constructed in 1877 and completed in 1879 for the use of the patients.

The theatre is held in care by the Langdon Down Centre Trust. It hosts productions by many different groups, including West London amateur opera company Richmond Opera (formerly Isleworth Baroque).

Work on the previously Grade II* listed building began in 2010. The workshops have been re-developed as social housing.

It is a popular filming location. It appeared in the Agatha Christie's Poirot episodes "The Tragedy at Marsdon Manor," "The Case of the Missing Will," "Double Sin," and "After the Funeral." It was also used in Dorian Gray (2009), the ITV series Downton Abbey, and the Netflix series Bridgerton
