= Rex Brinkworth =

Rex Brinkworth (1929) MBE (1929 or 1930 – 29 October 1998) was founder of the UK Down's Syndrome Association.

In 1970 Brinkworth, a teacher with an interest in children with learning disabilities, founded the Down's Babies' Association shortly after his own daughter, Francoise, was born with the condition. The Association started off on a purely voluntary basis and had small offices in Birmingham. A network of branches slowly extended across the country. These were made up of families and a few medical, education and social work professionals. Rex produced the first factsheets for parents containing positive information and activities to help the development of children with Down's syndrome.

The Down's Babies' Association eventually became the UK Down's Syndrome Association whose head office is now based in a wing of the old Normansfield Hospital, Teddington, Middlesex
