= Normansfield Hospital =

Coordinates: 51°25′12.83″N 0°18′45.22″W

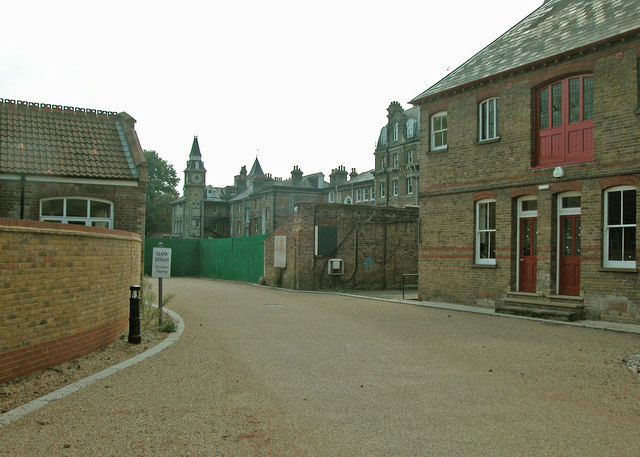
- Normansfield Hospital

- Location within Richmond upon Thames

Geography
- Location: Teddington, London, England, United Kingdom

Organisation
- Type: Mental health

History
- Founded: 1868
- Closed: 1997

Links
- Lists: Hospitals in England

Listed Building – Grade II*
- Official name: Normansfield Hospital
- Designated: 25 May 1983; amended 2 September 1996
- Reference no.: 1065379

Normansfield Hospital is a Grade II* listed building in Teddington in the London Borough of Richmond upon Thames, England. It was built as a facility for patients with an intellectual disability and included a theatre. It now houses the national office of the Down's Syndrome Association, and the Langdon Down Museum of Learning Disability.

== History ==
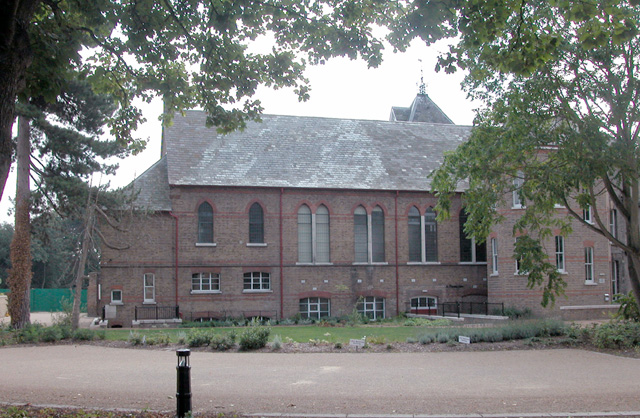
Normansfield Theatre exterior

The Normansfield Hospital was founded at the White House in Teddington as an institution for mentally disabled children by John Langdon Down, after whom Down syndrome was named. It was opened as the Normansfield Training Institution for Imbeciles in May 1868. The south wing was built in 1869, the north wing was added in 1873 and the Normansfield Theatre was opened by the Earl of Devon in 1879.

When Down died in 1896, his sons, Reginald and Percival, succeeded him as managers of the institution. It was renamed Normansfield in 1925 and joined the National Health Service in 1951.

The hospital was the scene of a strike by the nursing staff in the Trades Union COHSE in 1976. The nurses were angry that the regional health authority had ignored their grievances against the consultant psychiatrist Terence Lawlor and demanded that he be suspended. His suspension led to a public inquiry chaired by Michael Sherrard. It was one of many official inquiries into National Health Service mental hospitals during that period.

Dr Lawlor's professional style emerged as intolerant, abusive and tyrannical. COHSE was roundly criticised for a strike over which its officials had broken union rules, misled their membership and then blamed the nurses. An NHS administrator was found to be fearful of Dr Lawlor. The only body to emerge with any credit was the local Community Health Council, which was abolished in 2003. The inquiry recommended that Lawlor should be sacked. The same judgement applied to several senior nurses and administrators. The hospital closed in 1997.

The Down's Syndrome Association operates the Langdon Down Centre in the former hospital's theatre wing, which includes the national office of the Down's Syndrome Association, the Normansfield Theatre (a Grade II* listed Victorian theatre) and the Langdon Down Museum of Learning Disability. The museum's exhibits include information on John Langdon Down and his family, the history of the care of people with learning disabilities, and the history of the Normansfield Hospital and its residents. The museum also features art, including many works by James Henry Pullen, and artefacts of the former Royal Earlswood Museum in Surrey about the former Royal Earlswood Hospital.

The museum opened in 2012, and is a member of The London Museums of Health & Medicine group.

== See also ==
- Institutionalisation
