= Buckinghamshire Archives =

English county record office

Coordinates: 51.8143°N 0.8121°W

County record office overview
- Formed: 1938
- Headquarters: Walton Street Offices, Aylesbury, Buckinghamshire
- Employees: 13
- Website: www.buckinghamshire.gov.uk/culture-and-tourism/archives/

Buckinghamshire Archives (prior to 2020 the Centre for Buckinghamshire Studies) is the county record office for Buckinghamshire, England. It houses the former Buckinghamshire Record Office and the former Buckinghamshire Local Studies Library. It is located in the offices of Buckinghamshire Council, in Walton Street, Aylesbury.

The principal collections cover current-day Buckinghamshire (the areas administered by Buckinghamshire Council and Milton Keynes Council), as well as those areas of the county that are now in Berkshire, and include records from a range of organisations, families and individuals, notably:

- Church of England and Nonconformist churches including registers of baptism, marriage and burial
- Around 35,000 wills proved by the Archdeaconry of Buckingham
- County and District Councils
- Quarter and Petty Session courts
- Landed estates of families including the Aubrey-Fletchers, Hampdens, Carringtons and Fremantles
- Historic maps including Ordnance Survey, tithe and inclosure maps

The Archive also holds:

- A wide range of local history books, some for loan.
- Pamphlets and articles of local history interest.
- Local newspapers
- Computers for access to family history resources like Ancestry and FreeBMD.

Individual highlights within the collections include: the Winslow Manor court records and rolls, from 1327 onwards; records of the courts of the Archdeaconry of Buckingham, from 1483 onwards; the Charter to Incorporate the Borough of Buckingham by Letters Patent of Mary I, 1554; the cartulary of Missenden Abbey; the journal of Georgiana Grenfell of Taplow Court originally created for her children but by 1870 becoming her own personal journal, together with other papers of the Grenfell family; archives and records of Stoke Mandeville Hospital; papers and correspondence of the poet Theodora Roscoe; the 1798 posse comitatus of the Marquess of Buckingham as Lord Lieutenant of Buckinghamshire; and papers of Lord Carrington, including non-Carrington items such as the "Wycombe Family Notes", compiled by Charles W. Raffety.
