= John Langdon Down =

British physician (1828–1896)

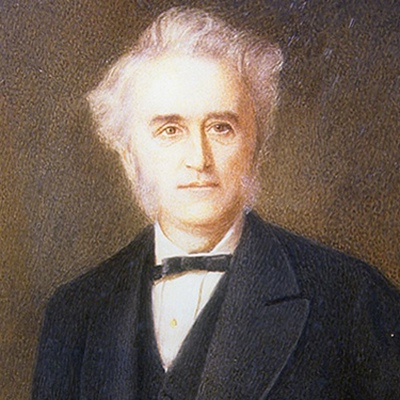
- Portrait of John Langdon Down (c. 1870) by Sydney Hodges
- Born: John Langdon Haydon Down; 18 November 1828; Torpoint, Cornwall, England
- Died: 7 October 1896 (aged 67); Teddington, Middlesex, England
- Education: London Hospital Medical College
- Occupation: Medical doctor
- Known for: First to describe Down's syndrome
- Children: 4

John Langdon Haydon Down (18 November 1828 – 7 October 1896) was a British physician best known for his description of the genetic condition Down's syndrome (also known as Down syndrome), which he originally classified in 1862. He is also noted for his work in social medicine and as a pioneer in the care of mentally disabled patients.

== Biography ==
=== Early life and education ===
Down was born in Torpoint, Cornwall, the youngest of seven children of the merchant Thomas Joseph Down. His father was originally from Derry in Ireland, and his mother, Hannah Haydon, from North Devon. His father was descended from an Irish family, his great-great-grandfather having been the Church of Ireland Bishop of Derry and Raphoe. John Down went to local schools including the Devonport Classical and Mathematical School.

At 14 he was apprenticed to his father, the village apothecary at Anthony St Jacob's. The vicar gave him a present of Arnott's Physics which made him determined to take up a scientific career. In 1846 he had a chance encounter with a girl who presented with what would later be called Down syndrome. This sparked his interest in becoming a doctor. At the age of 18, he went to London where he got a post working for a surgeon in the Whitechapel Road where he had to bleed patients, extract teeth, wash bottles and dispense drugs. Later he entered the pharmaceutical laboratory in Bloomsbury Square and won the prize for organic chemistry. He also met Michael Faraday and helped him with his work on gases. More than once he was called back to Torpoint to help his father in the business until the latter died in 1853.

=== Medical career ===
==== Early career ====
Down entered the Royal London Hospital as a student in 1853. One of his teachers was William John Little (of Little's disease). There he had a career distinguished by honours and gold medals and he qualified in 1856 at the Apothecaries Hall and the Royal College of Surgeons. In order to save money while in medical school, he stayed with his sister and her husband. While living with his sister, he met her sister-in-law, Mary Crellin, whom he later married in 1860. In 1858, he was appointed Medical Superintendent of the Earlswood Asylum in Surrey where he worked for 10 years.

==== Royal Earlswood Hospital ====
Down decided to transform Earlswood, a large institution which had its origins in two pioneering institutions set up in Highgate and Colchester, while he took his MB in London, won the gold medal in physiology and took his MRCP and MD degrees. He was elected Assistant Physician to the London Hospital and continued to live at Earlswood and practice there and in London.

Before Down and his wife, Mary, transformed Earlswood, it contained horrible conditions where patients were subject to corporal punishment, kept in dirty conditions, and unschooled. The duo banned punishment and replaced with kindness and rewards, the patients' dignity was valued and they were taught horse riding, gardening, crafts and elocution. Down restructured the administration of the Asylum and started a regimen of stimulation, good food, and occupational training.

==== Later career ====
After resigning from Earlswood, Down set up his own private home for those with developmental and intellectual disabilities at Normansfield, between Hampton Wick and Teddington. The home's first occupants were 18 mentally disabled children of upper-class members of the community such as lords and physicians. In the home, Down and his wife did their best to educate the children and exposed them to a wide variety of mentally stimulating activities. Normansfield was a success and eventually had to be expanded to house the growing number of its inhabitants. By 1876 the number of inhabitants in Normansfield had grown to 160.

Down also made contributions to medicine through his research and was the first person to publish a description of the Prader-Willi syndrome, which he called 'polysarcia'.

In 1887, he wrote the book Mental Affections of Childhood and Youth. It was published at the request of the Medical Society of London and was a transcript of three lectures along with fifteen papers Down published on mental defects. The book details his ideas and findings about several mental abnormalities such as Down syndrome and microcephaly and savant syndrome (naming it "idiot savantism"). It also contains his view on the leading thoughts and available literature on the subject. In the lectures and some of the papers, he also weighed in on what he believed were the potential causes of various mental disorders. A recurring theme was the influence of parental physical and mental health on their child's chances of being born with a mental disorder. He also explored how the obstetric practices of the time could have influenced postnatal health.

Down was a respected member of his community and was an elected member of the Middlesex County Council.

=== Death ===
Down died in the autumn of 1896 at the age of 67. His body was cremated and kept in Normansfield. After his death, people stood on the streets in respect as his funeral procession passed by. After his wife died, she was also cremated and their ashes were scattered together.

== Medicine ==
=== Observations on an Ethnic Classification of Idiots ===
In 1866, he wrote the paper "Observations on an Ethnic Classification of Idiots" in which he put forward the theory that it was possible to classify different types of conditions by ethnic characteristics. He listed several types including the Malay, Caucasian and Ethiopian types. In the main, the paper is about what is known as Down syndrome, named after him, but which he classified as the Mongolian type of idiot. As a result, Down syndrome was also known as "Mongolism" and people with Down syndrome referred to as "Mongoloids". Down's original terminology, later recognised as racist, continued to be used colloquially into the late 20th century. Down's paper also argued that if mere disease is able to break down racial barriers to the point of causing the facial features of the offspring of whites to resemble those of another race, then racial differences must be the result of variation, affirming therefore the unity of the human species. Down used this reasoning to argue against a tendency he perceived in his day to regard different races as separate species. However his classification clearly placed Whites at the top of an imagined hierarchy and others below.

=== Views on women ===
Down was an advocate for higher education for women and disagreed with the notion that it would make the women liable to produce "feeble-minded" children. He also believed women should be allowed to join the workforce. This belief led him to petition the lords of Earlswood to pay his wife Mary for her contributions to the running of Earlswood. This request was refused because at the time the contributions of women in the workforce were considered volunteer work. This situation was thought to put a strain on Down's relationship with the lords of Earlswood. Down eventually retired from Earlswood in 1868 after the lords refused to give him the money he needed to display the artwork of some of his patients at an exhibition.

== Legacy ==
His two surviving sons, Reginald and Percival, both qualified in medicine at the London Hospital, joined their father, and became responsible for the hospital after his death in 1896. His grandson, Reginald's son, was born in 1905 with Down syndrome.

Down's institution was later absorbed into the National Health Service in 1952.

A century after Down's death, his contributions to the field of medicine were celebrated at the Mansell Symposium in the Medical Society of London, and the Royal Society of Medicine published a biography about him.

The building at Normansfield is grade II* listed and is now known as the Langdon Down Centre. It accommodates the headquarters of the Down's Syndrome Association.

The newest part of his hometown, Torpoint, had a street named in his honour: Langdon Down Way.

== Bibliography ==
- Down, J Langdon (1887). On some of the mental affections of childhood and youth. J & A Churchill. OCLC 14771059.
- Down, J. Langdon (1990). On Some of the Mental Affections of Childhood and Youth. London : Philadelphia: Mac Keith Press; J.B. Lippincott. ISBN 0-397-48017-2.
- Down, J. Langdon (1866): Observations on an Ethnic Classification of Idiots. In: London Hospital Reports, 3: 1866, 259-262

== Sources ==
- GEW Wolstenholme; R Porter (1967). Mongolism: in commemoration of Dr. John Langdon Haydon Down. J & A Churchill. OCLC 32437930.
- A Sakula (1985). "The 'Langdons' : three distinguished Fellows". Journal of the Royal College of Physicians of London. 19 (3): 153. OCLC 12360810. PMC 5371144. PMID 30667828.
- OC Ward (1998). John Langdon Down, 1828–1896. Royal Society of Medicine Press. ISBN 1-85315-374-5.
- Wright, David (2011). DOWNS: The History of a Disability. Oxford: Oxford University Press. p. 256. ISBN 978-0-19-956793-5.
