= List of fellows of the British Academy elected in the 1930s =

The British Academy consists of world-leading scholars and researchers in the humanities and social sciences. Each year, it elects fellows to its membership. The following were elected in the 1930s.

== 1930 ==
- Professor Norman H. Baynes
- Dr J. Bonar
- Professor J. Wight Duff
- Dr Edward Jenks
- H. W. B. Joseph
- Professor J. E. Lloyd
- Dr Allen Mawer
- Professor J. G. Robertson
- Rev. H. E. Salter
- Professor C. K. Webster

== 1931 ==
- Professor W. M. Calder
- Sir William A. Craigie
- W. E. Crum
- Professor H. W. Garrod, CBE
- Professor S. H. Langdon
- Dr R. R. Marett
- Professor J. H. Muirhead
- Professor E. J. Rapson
- G. J. Turner
- Beatrice Webb
- Professor A. N. Whitehead
- Professor J. Dover Wilson

== 1932 ==
- H. I. Bell, OBE
- Sir T. L. Heath, KCB, KCVO
- Dr R. B. McKerrow
- Dr W. Miller
- Professor H. A. Prichard
- D. H. Robertson
- Professor R. W. Seton-Watson
- Professor D. Nichol Smith
- Very Rev. H. J. White

== 1933 ==
- C. Bailey
- Professor S. A. Cook
- Professor R. M. Dawkins
- Dr J. K. Fotheringham
- Professor J. Laird
- Professor R. W. Lee
- Professor G. C. Moore Smith
- Professor J. Holland Rose
- Sir Herbert Thompson

== 1934 ==
- Dr A. E. Brooke
- R. G. Collingwood
- R. E. W. Flower
- C. Johnson
- Professor J. S. Mackenzie
- N. McLean
- Dr A. W. Pickard-Cambridge
- Professor H. J. Rose
- Professor R. H. Tawney
- R. Campbell Thompson
- Professor P. H. Winfield

== 1935 ==
- A. W. Clapham
- R. G. Hawtrey
- Professor A. Berriedale Keith
- Dr F. R. Tennant
- Professor Basil Williams

== 1936 ==
- Professor F. E. Adcock
- E. A. Barber
- Dr L. D. Barnett
- Dr A. J. Carlyle
- Professor G. N. Clark
- Sir John Marshal
- Dr H. Thomas

== 1937 ==
- Lascelles Abercrombie
- Sir W. Beveridge
- W. H. Buckler
- F. M. Cornford
- J. D. Denniston
- Sir H. Richmond
- Professor Arnold Toynbee

== 1938 ==
- Professor B. Ashmole
- Lord Atkin
- Dr C. M. Bowra
- E. W. Brooks
- Professor W. G. de Burgh
- Dr D. Randall-MacIver
- Rev. Dr J. W. Oman
- Dr C. T. Onions
- Professor Ifor Williams

== 1939 ==
- Professor J. M. Creed
- Campbell Dodgson
- Professor G. R. Driver
- Professor V. H. Galbraith
- Sir Stephen Gaselee
- Dr A. D. McNair
- Sir Sarvepalli Radhakrishnan

== See also ==
- Fellows of the British Academy
