= Herbert Edward Salter =

English historian and clergyman

Herbert Edward Salter (1863–1951) was an English historian and clergyman.

== Early life and education ==
Born at Montague Street, Bloomsbury, London on 6 February 1863, Salter was the son of the physician Henry Hyde Salter, FRS, and his wife Henrietta Laura, daughter of the Rev. Edward Powlett Blunt. His brother was the judge Sir Arthur Salter. Herbert was educated at Wimborne Grammar School and, from 1876, Winchester College (on a scholarship). He then studied at New College, Oxford, graduating with a first-class degree in Literae Humaniores in 1886 and then another first in Theology the following year.

== Career, work and recognition ==
Salter trained for the priesthood at Cuddesdon College and was ordained Deacon at Cuddesdon Church on 27 June 1888. He then served as Curate at Sandhurst, and was ordained Priest at Oxford in 1889. In 1891, he left that office to be vice-principal of Leeds Clergy School. He was then vicar of Mattingley (1893–99) and Shirburn, Oxfordshire (1899–1909). During his incumbency of the latter parish he began to gather material for its history, which eventually led to him editing documents for publication by the Oxford Historical Society (OHS). He devoted the rest of his life to studying the history of Oxford, the city's university and the county; he edited 34 volumes for the OHS alone, but also wrote historical works. As The Oxford Dictionary of National Biography notes, "Salter came to be recognised as the leading authority on Oxford history since Anthony Wood".

Salter was elected a research fellow at Magdalen College, Oxford, in 1918; he used the stipend to fund publication costs. He was elected a fellow of the British Academy and an honorary freeman of Oxford in 1930; in 1933 was given an honorary DLitt by the university; and in 1934 he gave the Ford Lectures at the University of Oxford. That year, he was the subject of a Festschrift.

Salter retired from his fellowship at Magdalen in 1939.

Salter died at his home in Sturminster Newton in Dorset on 23 April 1951. His first wife Beatrice, née Ruddach, had died in 1932, and the following year he married his second wife, Gladys Nina Dewar, who survived him. There were four children from the first marriage.

== Selected publications ==
Note: POHS = Publications of the Oxford Historical Society. ORS = Oxfordshire Record Series (of the Oxfordshire Record Society).

- Eynsham Cartulary, 2 vols., POHS, nos. 49, 51 (Oxford, 1907–08).
- (with William Patterson Ellis) A Subsidy Collected in the Diocese of Lincoln in 1526 (Oxford: B. H. Blackwell, 1909).
- Survey of Oxford in 1772, with Maps and Plans (London: Henry Frowde, 1912).
- Records of Mediaeval Oxford (Oxford: Oxford Chronicle Company, 1912).
- The Oxford Deeds of Balliol College, POHS, no. 64 (Oxford: Clarendon Press, 1913).
- Remarks and Collections of Thomas Hearne, vols. 9–11, POHS, nos. 65, 67, 72 (Oxford: Clarendon Press, 1914–21).
- A Cartulary of the Hospital of St. John the Baptist, 3 vols., POHS, nos. 66, 68 and 69 (Oxford: Clarendon Press, 1914–17).
- (with G. J. Turner) The Register of St. Augustine's Abbey, Canterbury, Commonly Called the Black Book, parts 1 and 2 (London: Oxford University Press, 1915–24).
- Mediaeval Archives of the University of Oxford, POHS, nos. 70 and 73 (Oxford: Clarendon Press, 1920).
- Munimenta Civitatis Oxonie, POHS, no. 71 (Oxford: Clarendon Press, 1920).
- Newington Longeville Charters, ORS, no. 3 (Oxford: Oxfordshire Record Society, 1921).
- The Historic Names of the Streets and Lanes of Oxford Intra Muros (Oxford: Clarendon Press, 1921).
- Chapters of the Augustine Canons, POHS, no. 74 (Oxford: Clarendon Press, 1922).
- Surveys and Tokens, POHS, no. 75 (Oxford: Clarendon Press, 1923).
- Registrum Annalium Collegii Mertonensis, 1483–1521, POHS, no. 76 (Oxford: Clarendon Press, 1923).
- Snappe's Formulary, POHS, no. 80 (Oxford: Clarendon Press, 1924).
- Oxford City Properties, POHS, no. 83 (Oxford: Clarendon Press, 1926).
- (with the Rev. G. C. Richards) The Dean's Register of Oriel, 1446–1661, POHS, no. 84 (Oxford: Clarendon Press, 1926).
- (based on work by C. L. Shadwell) Oriel College Records, POHS, no. 85 (Oxford: Clarendon Press, 1926).
- (vol. 3 with M. G. Hobson) Oxford Council Acts, vols. 1–3, POHS, Old Series, nos. 87, 95; New Series, no. 2 (Oxford: Clarendon Press, 1928–39).
- Facsimiles of Early Charters in Oxford Muniment Rooms (Oxford: Oxford University Press, 1929).
- The Oseney Abbey Cartulary, 6 vols., POHS, nos. 89–91, 97–98, 101 (Oxford: Clarendon Press, 1929–36)
- The Feet of Fines for Oxfordshire, 1195–1291, ORS, no. 12 (Oxford: Oxfordshire Record Society, 1930).
- The Boarstall Cartulary, POHS, no. 88 (Oxford: Clarendon Press, 1930).
- Registrum Cancellarii Oxoniensis, 2 vols., POHS, nos. 93–94 (Oxford: Clarendon Press, 1932).
- The Churchwardens' Accounts of St. Michael's Church, Oxford (Oxford: Oxfordshire Archaeological Society, 1933).
- Map of Medieval Oxford (Oxford: Oxford University Press, 1934).
- Medieval Oxford, POHS, no. 100 (Oxford: Clarendon Press, 1936).
- (with W. H. Stevenson) The Early History of St. John's College Oxford, POHS, New Series, no. 1 (Oxford: Clarendon Press, 1939).
- (with W. A. Pantin and H. G. Richardson) Formularies which Bear on the History of Oxford, c. 1204–1420, 2 vols., POHS, New Series, nos. 4 and 5 (Oxford: Clarendon Press, 1942).
- The Thame Cartulary, ORS, nos. 25–26 (Oxford: Oxfordshire Record Society, 1947–48).
- (with Mary D. Lobel) A History of the County of Oxford, vol. 3: The University of Oxford (Oxford: Oxford University Press for the Victoria County History, 1954).
- (posthumously; edited by W. A. Pantin) Survey of Oxford, 2 vols, POHS, New Series, nos. 14 and 20 (Oxford: Clarendon Press, 1960).
