= F. M. Powicke =

British historian (1879–1963)

Sir F. M. Powicke FBA FRHistS
- Portrait of Powicke, c. 1947
- Born: Frederick Maurice Powicke; 16 June 1879; Alnwick, England
- Died: 19 May 1963 (aged 83); Oxford, England
- Other name: Maurice Powicke
- Title: Regius Professor of Modern History (1928–1947)
- Spouse: Susan Irvine Martin (m. 1909)
- Awards: Knight Bachelor (1946)

Academic background
- Education: Owens College, Manchester; Balliol College, Oxford

Academic work
- Discipline: History
- Sub-discipline: English medieval history
- Institutions: Merton College, Oxford; Queen's University, Belfast; Victoria University of Manchester
- Doctoral students: Richard William Hunt; Beryl Smalley; James Lydon (historian)
- Notable students: Margaret Wade Labarge; Kathleen Major
- Influenced: C. R. Cheney; William Abel Pantin; R. W. Southern

Sir Frederick Maurice Powicke (16 June 1879 – 19 May 1963) was an English medieval historian. He was a fellow of Merton College, Oxford, a professor at Queen's University, Belfast, and the Victoria University of Manchester, and from 1928 until his retirement Regius Professor at the University of Oxford. He was made a Knight Bachelor in 1946.

== Life ==
Powicke was born on 16 June 1879 in Alnwick, the son of Frederick James Powicke, a Congregational minister and historian of 17th-century Puritanism, and Martha, the youngest daughter of William Collyer of Brigstock. Powicke was educated at Owens College, Manchester, where he took his first degree, and at Balliol College, Oxford, where he took another with first-class honours.

From 1908 to 1915 Powicke was a fellow of Merton College, Oxford, although in 1909 he was appointed as Professor of Modern History in the Queen's University, Belfast, where he remained for ten years. From 1919 to 1928 he was Professor of Mediæval History at the Victoria University of Manchester, and during his time in Manchester he was a member of the Chetham Society and served on its council from 1920 to 1933. He also served as Ford's Lecturer in English History at Oxford for 1927. In 1928 he became Regius Professor of Modern History at Oxford, remaining in post until 1947. He was President of the Royal Historical Society from 1933 to 1937.

Powicke was small in build. At Oxford, he was determined to reinvigorate history there and make the university the leading centre in England for historical study.

Powicke was the author of the volume The Thirteenth Century in the Oxford History of England.

In 1909, Powicke married Susan Irvine Martin, daughter of Anna and Thomas Martin Lindsay. Together they had two daughters. Their daughter Janet married the historian Richard Pares.

Powicke died in the Radcliffe Infirmary in Oxford on 19 May 1963.

== Works ==
- The Loss of Normandy 1189–1204: Studies in the History of the Angevin Empire (1913)
- Bismarck and the Origin of the German Empire (1914)
- Ailred of Rievaulx and his biographer Walter Daniel (1922)
- Stephen Langton (1927) Ford Lectures
- Gerald of Wales (1928)
- Historical Study at Oxford (1929) Inaugural lecture
- Robert Grosseteste and the Nicomachean Ethics (1930)
- Sir Henry Spelman and the 'Concilia' (1930) Raleigh Lecture on History
- The Medieval Books of Merton College (1931) A catalogue
- Oxford Essays in Medieval History. Presented to Herbert Edward Salter (1934) editor
- The Christian Life in the Middle Ages (1935) essays
- International Bibliography of Historical Sciences. Twelfth year (1937) editor
- History, Freedom and Religion (1938) Riddell Memorial Lectures
- Handbook of British Chronology (1939) editor
- Three Lectures (1947)
- King Henry III and the Lord Edward: the Community of the Realm in the Thirteenth Century (1947) 2 volumes (2nd ed., 1968)
- Mediaeval England, 1066–1485 (1948)
- Ways of Medieval Life and Thought: Essays and Addresses (1949)
- Walteri Danielis: Vita Ailredi Abbatis Rievall: The Life of Ailred of Rievaulx by Walter Daniel (1950) editor
- Oxford History of England – Thirteenth Century 1216 – 1307 (1953)
- The Reformation in England (1953)
- Modern Historians and the Study of History: Essays and Papers (London: Odhams Press, 1955)

=== Collaborations ===
- The Universities of Europe in the Middle Ages (3 vols) by Hastings Rashdall, editor with A. B. Emden
- The Battle of Lewes 1264 (1964) with R. F. Treharne and Charles Lemmon
- The Administration of the Honor of Leicester in the Fourteenth Century (1940) with L. Fox
- Essays in Medieval History Presented to Thomas Frederick Tout (1925) editor with A. G. Little

== Honours ==
- Fellow of the British Academy, 1927
- Corresponding Fellow of the Medieval Academy of America, 1929
- Honorary Fellow of Balliol College, Oxford, 1939
- Knight Bachelor, 1946
- Honorary Fellow of Oriel College, Oxford, 1947
- Hon. Member of the Massachusetts Historical Society, 1947
- Hon. Member of the American Historical Association
- Hon. Member of the Royal Irish Academy, 1949
- Hon. DLitt, University of Cambridge
- Hon. DLitt, Durham University
- Hon. LLD, University of St Andrews
- Hon. LLD, University of Glasgow
- Hon. LittD, University of Manchester, University of Liverpool, Queen's University Belfast, University of London and Harvard University
- Hon. Doctorate, University of Caen

Academic offices
Preceded by	Ford Lecturer; 1926–1927	Succeeded by Albert Pollard
Preceded by Henry William Carless Davis	Regius Professor of Modern History at the University of Oxford; 1928–1947	Succeeded by Vivian Hunter Galbraith
Professional and academic associations
Preceded by Sir Richard Lodge	President of the Royal Historical Society; 1933–1937	Succeeded by Frank Stenton
Preceded by A. T. P. Williams	President of the Surtees Society; 1953–61	Succeeded by John Herbert Severn Wild
