= Laetitia Jermyn =

British entomologist, illustrator and author (1788–1848)

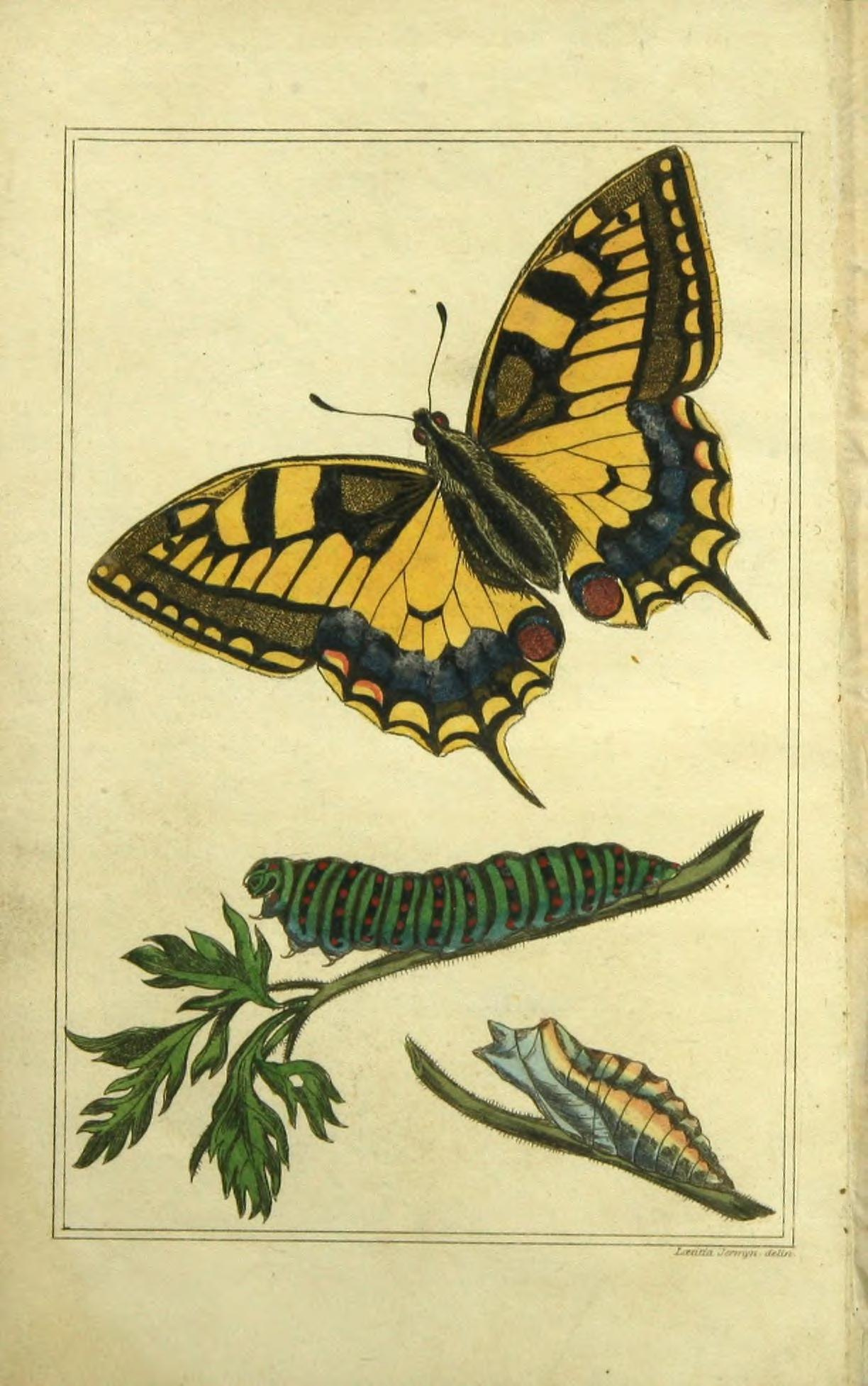
Page from The Butterfly Collector's Vade Mecum by Laetitia Jermyn

Laetitia Jermyn (1788–1848) was a British entomologist, illustrator and author. She was mentored by William Kirby, to whom she dedicated her best remembered work: The Butterfly Collector’s Vade Mecum, meaning 'ready reference'.

== Life ==
Laetitia Jermyn, was born in Suffolk in 1788, the daughter of George Jermyn and his with Margaret née Manning. George had taken gone into partnership with the Ipswich librarian and bookseller Charles Punchard in 1787, running the business on his own following Punchard's death in 1790 Ipswich book seller. George in turn died in 1799, and Laetitia's mother ran the business until her marriage to John Raw, who published the first book under his imprint in 1802. Her family allowed her to foster an interest in butterflies, and she was encouraged too by her neighbour William Kirby. Jermyn was said to have 'cultivated wide literary tastes.'

In 1830, she married Dr. James Ford, an antiquary, scholar, and vicar of Navestock, Essex. Ford was a significant benefactor of Trinity College, Oxford, and the Ford Lectures are named for him. He was said to be 'an ardent bibliophile, studious, punctilious, meditative, but also rather pompous and intolerant.' He one Sunday rebuked his wife mid-sermon for arriving late to the service, asking "I wonder where you will be Madam when the last trumpet sounds?' The couple had no children.

== Work ==
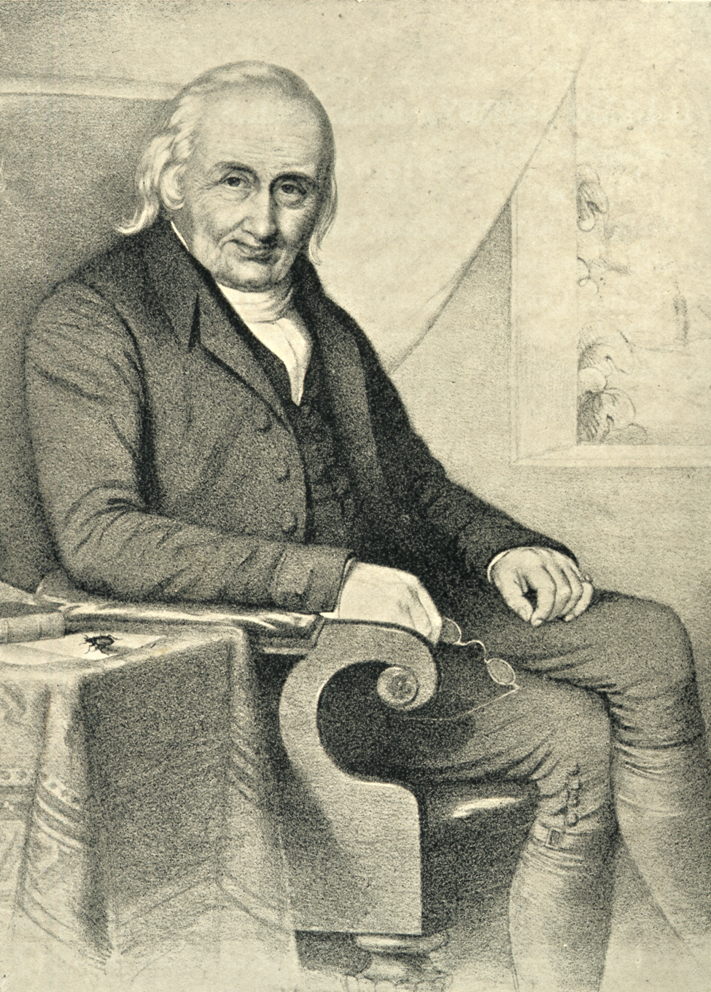
Entomologist William Kirby, Jermyn's neighbour and mentor.

In 1824, Jermyn published The Butterfly Collector’s Vade Mecum, signing the preface 'LJ'. As Peter Marren has written, in the 'resolutely masculine atmosphere of the Victorian age', women were often unwilling or unable to publish scientific works under their own name. In 1827, however, in the second edition of the Vade Mecum, she used her full name. A third edition was published in 1836 under her married name, Laetitia Ford. Jermyn dedicated the book to her neighbour and mentor William Kirby:

Whose ardent and unremitting zeal in the study of entomology, and whose valuable and judicious labours in that science, demand the grateful acknowledgement of every true friend and admirer of natural history.

Jermyn also used the work to defend the practice of butterfly collecting 'against the scorn of those who attack the study of natural history as a trifling and worthless pursuit.' She formally named a species previously known only as 'Albin's Hampstead Eye', calling it Papilio hampstediensis. It is now generally accepted to have been the Junonia villida, more commonly called the Meadow argus.

Jermyn also wrote a memoir of her friend, the poet and naturalist Elizabeth Cobbold, published in 1825. The work was described as 'rhapsodic', highlighting the 'versatility and universality of her [Cobbold's] genius'.

== Death ==
Laetitia Jermyn died in 1848 and was buried (under her maiden name) in Navestock. She is commemorated in Navestock Church with a memorial tablet, which names her as 'Mistress Ford'.
