= Houlbrooke =

Houlbrooke is a surname. Notable people with the surname include:

- Isaac Houlbrooke (born 2001), field hockey player from New Zealand
- Ralph Houlbrooke, professor of early modern history at the University of Reading
- Theophilus Houlbrooke (1745–1824), British minister remembered mainly as an amateur botanist
