= Kate Tiller =

British historian (1949–2024)

Kate Tiller OBE DL FSA FRHistS (1949–30 May 2024) was an academic in the History Faculty at Oxford University, Reader emerita in English local history and a founding Fellow at Kellogg College, University of Oxford.

Her academic fields were British social and local history, with particular research interests in English rural change post-1750, and in religion and community in Britain since 1730. She also wrote on the academic practice of local history, with research interests in local histories of the 20th century and of remembrance and community. She taught on graduate and outreach programmes and to supervise Master's and DPhil students in Chartism and Methodism. Her book English Local History: An Introduction, first published in 1987, has been described as "a standard work" on the subject; the third edition was published in 2020.

She served on the Council of the Chapels Society, a registered charity, and was the academic director and coordinator of the "Communities of Dissent" project run by the Family and Community Historical Research Society (FACHRS) between 2017 and 2020.

Tiller chaired the Victoria County History for Oxfordshire from 2003 to 2021. She also chaired the Oxfordshire Blue Plaques Board (2008-2012) and the Oxfordshire Record Society.

The only woman among the founding fellows of Kellogg College, Oxford elected in 1990, Tiller went on to serve as the college's academic dean, senior tutor and vice president. Tiller planned and implemented the first graduate degree specifically designed for part-time students at the University of Oxford: the Master of Studies in English local history, which began in 1993. Two years later, a part-time DPhil in the same subject began to be offered.

Tiller completed her doctorate on post-Chartist working-class politics at the University of Birmingham in 1979. The same year she joined the Oxford University Department for Continuing Education, being appointed a university lecturer in local history in 1984. In 1999 she became reader in English local history.

== Selected publications ==
=== Articles ===
- "Charterville and the Chartist Land Company" in Oxoniensia, L (1985), pp. 251–266
- "Religion in 19th-century Britain" in J. Golby (ed), Communities and Families. Cambridge University Press and the Open University, 1994, revised edition 1997) pp. 155–181
- "Rural resistance: Custom, community and conflict in South Oxfordshire, 1800-1914" in O. Ashton et al. (eds), The duty of discontent. Essays for Dorothy Thompson (Mansell, 1995) pp. 97–121
- "Shopkeeping in 17th-century Oxfordshire: William Brock of Dorchester" in Oxoniensia, LXII (1997), pp. 269–286
- "English Local History: the state of the art" (Wolfson Lecture, Cambridge, 1998)
- "Hook Norton, Oxfordshire: An open village" in J Thirsk (ed), The English Rural Landscape. Oxford University Press, 2000.
- "Ways of seeing. Hoskins and the Oxfordshire landscape revisited", in P.S. Barnwell and M. Palmer (eds), Post-medieval Landscapes. Landscape History after Hoskins, Vol. 3 (Windgather Press, 2007), pp. 185–200.
- "Local history at the crossroads", in The Local Historian (Vol. 37 No. 4, November 2007).
- "The desert begins to blossom: Oxfordshire and Primitive Methodism, 1824–1860", in Oxoniensia (Vol. LXXI, 2007), pp. 83–109.
- "Local History and the Twentieth Century: an overview and suggested agenda", in International Journal of Regional and Local Studies, Vol. 6 ( 2011).
- "Local History in England" and "Local History in Ireland" in C. Kammen and A.H. Wilson (eds), Encyclopaedia of Local History (Alta Mira Press, US, 2013 and later editions).
- "Anniversaries, war, and local history", in History News, Winter 2015 (American Association of State and Local History).
- "Patterns of Dissent: The Social and Religious Geography of Nonconformity in Three Counties", International Journal of Regional and Local History, Vol. 13, No. 1 (2018), pp. 4–31.
- "How to read a chapel", The Chapels Society Journal, Vol. 3 (2018), pp. 3–23 (The First Christopher Stell Memorial Lecture).
- "Communities of Dissent 1850–1914: the Heyday of Chapel?", The Chapels Society Journal, Vol. 4 (2023), pp. 3–24.

=== Books and edited works ===
- Blenheim: Landscape for a palace. Alan Sutton, 1987. (2nd edition 1997) (Edited with J. Bond)
- English local history: an introduction. Alan Sutton, 1992. (Revised edition with chapter on 20th century, 2002; 3rd edition published 2020).
- Dorchester Abbey: Church and people 635–2005. 2005. (Editor and contributor, including "Religion and community: Dorchester 1800–1920", pp. 61–83.)
- An historical atlas of Oxfordshire. Oxfordshire Record Society, 2010. (Edited with G. Darkes)
- Religious census returns for Berkshire, Berkshire Record Society, 14 (2010), lx +133pp.
- Remembrance and community: War memorials and local history. British Association for Local History, 2013.
- Parsonages. Shire, 2016.
- Communities of Dissent 1850–1914. The Chapels Society Journal, Vol. 4 (2023) (edited with Chris Skidmore)
