= William of Nottingham =

William of Nottingham usually refers to either of:

- William of Nottingham I (d. 1254), the 4th Franciscan Minister Provincial of England
- William of Nottingham II (fl. 1320), the 17th Franciscan Minister Provincial of England

It may also refer to:

- William of Nottingham (mid-13th century), high sheriff of Lincolnshire
- William of Nottingham (14th century), a prominent Anglo-Irish noble
- William of Nottingham (lawyer) (fl. in 15th century) a lawyer who served as attorney general of England from 1452 to 1461

== See also ==
- William Nottingham High School in Syracuse, New York, named for a local lawyer
