= James Hamilton Wylie =

British historian

James Hamilton Wylie (8 June 1844 – 25 February 1914) was a British historian. Described by Juliet Barker as "the epitome of a Victorian antiquarian" and "the master of Lancastrian history" by James Westfall Thompson, he is best known for his four-volume History of England Under Henry the Fourth (1884–98) and three-volume The Reign of Henry the Fifth (1914–1929), completed after his death by William Templeton Waugh.

Educated at Christ's Hospital and Pembroke College, Oxford, Wylie spent much of his career as an Inspector of Schools.

Wylie gave the Ford Lectures in 1900 on The Council of Constance to the death of John Hus.
