= William Abel Pantin =

British historian (1902–1973)

- Born: 1 May 1902; Blackheath, London, England
- Died: 10 November 1973 (aged 71)
- Education: Westminster School
- Alma mater: Christ Church, Oxford
- Occupation: Mediaeval historian
- Known for: History of the Order of Saint Benedict in England; medieval history of the City and University of Oxford.

William Abel Pantin FBA (1 May 1902 – 10 November 1973) was a historian of medieval England who spent most of his academic life at the University of Oxford.

== Life ==
Pantin was born in Blackheath, south London, on 1 May 1902. He was educated at Westminster School and Christ Church, Oxford, where he obtained a first-class degree in Modern History in 1923. He undertook research at the University of Oxford after winning a Bryce Research Studentship.

From 1926 he taught history at the Victoria University of Manchester, first as an Assistant Lecturer and then as the Bishop Fraser Lecturer. At Manchester he worked under F. M. Powicke, Professor of Mediaeval History, who influenced Pantin's work for the rest of his life. In 1929 the Royal Historical Society awarded its Alexander Prize to Pantin for his essay The General and Provincial Chapters of the English Black Monks, 1215–1540. The "Black Monks" were the Order of Saint Benedict, whose history in England remained a subject of Pantin's research and published works for the rest of his life.

In 1928 Powicke moved to Oxford to become Regius Professor of Modern History. In 1933 Pantin followed, becoming a tutorial fellow and Lecturer in History at Oriel College, Oxford. He was also a university lecturer in mediaeval archaeology and history from 1937 onwards.

Pantin was active in the Oxford Architectural and Historical Society (OAHS), serving on the Editorial Committee of its journal Oxoniensia and on the OAHS's Sub-Committee for Old Houses. He was President of the OAHS 1959–64.

During his career at Oxford a substantial number of the city's unique mediaeval buildings were destroyed for redevelopment. In 1936–37 the University of Oxford had a row of historic houses in Broad Street demolished to make way for the New Bodleian Library. In 1954–55 F. W. Woolworth had the mediaeval Clarendon Hotel in Cornmarket Street demolished to make way for a new retail store. In 1959 Oxford City Council had Lower Fisher Row beside Castle Mill Stream demolished as slum clearance. In each case Pantin recorded the buildings as fully as possible before and during their demolition, and published his results in Oxoniensia.

In 1940 Pantin was appointed General Editor of the Oxford Historical Society. He developed an interest in the archives of the University of Oxford, which in 1946 appointed him Keeper of the Archives.

Pantin was appointed a Fellow of the British Academy (FBA) in 1948 and was a member of the Royal Commission on the Historical Monuments of England from 1963 onwards.

Pantin retired from his college and university posts in 1969, and Oriel College made him an Honorary Fellow in 1971. He died on 10 November 1973.

== Charitable trust ==
There was a William Abel Pantin Trust to further historical research in Oxford and support the charitable and educational functions of the Provost and Fellows of Oriel College, Oxford. It was founded in January 1971 and dissolved in August 2013.

== Works ==
- "Some Recent Works on Monasticism". The Journal of the Historical Association. 12. London: Historical Association. 1927–28.
- Documents Illustrating the General and Provincial Chapters of the English Black Monks, 1215–1540. Vol. I. London: Royal Historical Society. 1931.
- Documents Illustrating the General and Provincial Chapters of the English Black Monks, 1215–1540. Vol. II. London: Royal Historical Society. 1933.
- "College Muniments: A Preliminary Note" (PDF). Oxoniensia. I. Oxford Architectural and Historical Society: 140–143. 1936.
- Documents Illustrating the General and Provincial Chapters of the English Black Monks, 1215–1540. Vol. III. London: Royal Historical Society. 1937.
- "The Recently Demolished Houses in Broad Street" (PDF). Oxoniensia. II. Oxford Architectural and Historical Society: 171–200. 1937. (Also published as an offprint)
- Formularies Which Bear on the History of Oxford, c. 1204–1420. Oxford Historical Society, New Series. Vol. I. Oxford: Oxford Historical Society. 1939.
- "Notley Abbey" (PDF). Oxoniensia. VI. Oxford Architectural and Historical Society: 22–48. 1941.
- "Tackley's Inn, Oxford" (PDF). Oxoniensia. VII. Oxford Architectural and Historical Society: 80–93. 1942.
- Canterbury College Oxford. Oxford Historical Society, New Series, Vol VIII. Vol. III. Oxford: Clarendon Press for the Oxford Historical Society. 1944.
- "Gloucester College" (PDF). Oxoniensia. XI–XII. Oxford Architectural and Historical Society: 65–74. 1946–47.
- Canterbury College Oxford. Vol. I. Oxford: Clarendon Press. 1947.
- Canterbury College Oxford. Vol. II. Oxford: Clarendon Press. 1947.
- Pantin, W. A. (1947). "The development of domestic architecture in Oxford". Antiquaries Journal. XXVII (3–4). London: Society of Antiquaries of London: 120–150. doi:10.1017/s0003581500016796. S2CID 162941290.
- Canterbury College Oxford. Vol. IV. Oxford: Clarendon Press for the Oxford Historical Society. 1950.
- The English Church in the Fourteenth Century. Cambridge: Cambridge University Press. 1955.
- "The Golden Cross, Oxford" (PDF). Oxoniensia. (with E. Clive Rouse). Oxford Architectural and Historical Society. 1955.
- "The Clarendon Hotel Oxford. Part II: The Buildings" (PDF). Oxoniensia. XXIII. Oxford Architectural and Historical Society: 84–129. 1958. (Also published as an offprint)
- Pantin, W. A. (1957). "Medieval Priests' Houses in South-West England" (PDF). Medieval Archaeology. 1. Society for Medieval Archaeology: 118–146. doi:10.1080/00766097.1957.11735386. (Also published as an offprint)
- "Monuments or Muniments? The interrelation of Material Remains and Documentary" (PDF). Medieval Archaeology. 2. Society for Medieval Archaeology: 156–158. 1958. (Also published as an offprint)
- Pantin, W. A. (1959). "Chantry Priests' Houses and other Medieval Lodgings" (PDF). Medieval Archaeology. 3. Society for Medieval Archaeology: 216–258. doi:10.1080/00766097.1959.11735592. (Also published as an offprint)
- "Houses of the Oxford Region. I. Fisher Row, Oxford" (PDF). Oxoniensia. XXV. Oxford: Oxford Architectural and Historical Society: 121–125. 1960.
- "Houses of the Oxford Region. II. Hordley Farm" (PDF). Oxoniensia. XXV. Oxford: Oxford Architectural and Historical Society: 126–130. 1960. (Also published as an offprint)
- Pantin, W. A. (1962). "The Merchants' Houses and Warehouses of Kings Lynn" (PDF). Medieval Archaeology. 6. Society for Medieval Archaeology: 173–181. doi:10.1080/00766097.1962.11735665.
- Pantin, W. A. (1962). "Medieval English Town-house Plans" (PDF). Medieval Archaeology. 6. Society for Medieval Archaeology: 202–239. doi:10.1080/00766097.1962.11735667. (Also published as an offprint)
- "The halls and schools of medieval Oxford: an attempt at reconstruction". Oxford Studies Presented to Daniel Callus. Oxford Historical Society, New Series. Vol. XVI. Oxford: Clarendon Press for the Oxford Historical Society. 1964. pp. 31–100.
- "Minchery Farm, Littlemore" (PDF). Oxoniensia. XXXV. Oxford: Oxford Architectural and Historical Society: 19–26. 1970. (Also published as an offprint)
- Oxford Life in Oxford Archives. Oxford: Oxford University Press. 1972. ISBN 019822351X.

== Sources ==
- Highfield, J.R.L. (1974). "W. A. Pantin: in Memoriam" (PDF). Oxoniensia. XXXIX. Oxford: Oxfordshire Architectural and Historical Society: iv–v.
