= William of Nottingham I =

English Franciscan friar

William of Nottingham, OFM (Latin: Guilelmus de Nottingham, Gulielmus Notingham, or Willelmus de Notyngham; d. 1254), (Note: His death was formerly placed in 1251.) was an English Franciscan friar who served as the fourth Minister Provincial of England (1240–1254).

== Life ==
The Franciscan Order supposedly reached Nottingham in 1230, settling in the Broad Marsh. The son of well-off parents, William entered the order early in life and may have attended Robert Grosseteste's lectures at Oxford. His brother Augustine also joined the Franciscans. He served under Pope Innocent IV and followed the pope's nephew Opizzo east when he was appointed Latin Patriarch of Antioch. While there, Augustine served as titular archbishop of Laodicea in Syria.

Without holding lesser offices, William was appointed vicar of Haymo of Faversham, the third Minister Provincial of England in 1239, and was elected to succeed him upon Haymo's promotion to Minister General of the Order in 1240. As Minister Provincial, he appears in the chronicle of his friend Thomas of Eccleston as a helpful and wise cleric with good humor and strong force of character, "thinking nothing of incurring the anger of the powerful for the sake of justice". He was a contemporary of William of Esseby and enlarged the Franciscan houses at York, Bristol, and Bridgwater. He resisted other proposed expansions, however, with the admonition "I did not become a friar for the purpose of building walls". He had the roof removed from the London chapel and the embossments on its cloister scraped away but provided lecturers from the universities to visit all the larger convents. He resisted inroads by the Dominicans, traveling to the papal court in 1244 to obtain a letter restraining their proselytizing. (He probably attended the general chapter at Genoa during this trip, although Eccleston's account of its activities seems to have been mistaken.) In 1250, John of Parma held a chapter at Oxford, taking a referendum as to whether William should be confirmed in or deposed from his post; the vote was unanimous in his favor.

Little states that he was supported by the general chapter at Metz the next year and, probably at the same time, carried a decree rejecting Pope Innocent IV's laxer Expositio Regulae in favor of Gregory IX's Expositio. Mellors states that he was deposed by the Council of Metz nine years after taking office. En route to the papal court, his socius contracted the plague at Geneva or Genoa. William remained and tended to him, catching the infection himself and dying around July 1254. Mellors claims he was buried in Marseille.

The English Franciscans, indignant at his deposition, had meanwhile reëlected him unanimously. He was succeeded in his position by the Minister Provincial of Germany, Peter of Tewkesbury.

== Works ==
"A Good Sermon on Obedience" (Latin: Sermo Bonus de Obedentia), copied in the style of the 3rd quarter of the 13th century, is attributed to William. On the authority of Eccleston, he is also responsible for A Concordance of the Four Gospels (Note: 12 MSS at Oxford's Trinity College and Cambridge's Pembroke College.) or Concordance to the Evangelists.

This William is also often credited with a Commentary on the Gospels which remained well known for centuries, (Note: As, for instance, by A.G. Little. The misattribution relied on a passage in Thomas of Eccleston whereby this William was said to have compiled "thoroughly useful canons" from Clement of Llanthony's work One from Four and (separately) had one of Clement's commentaries recopied at his scriptorium.) but it should be properly attributed to the later English Minister Provincial also known as William of Nottingham.
