= James Ford (antiquary) =

James Ford (31 October 1779 in Canterbury – 31 January 1850 in Navestock, Essex), was an English antiquary.

== Life ==
Born in Canterbury, Ford was the eldest son of the Rev. James Ford, B.A., minor canon of Durham, and afterwards minor canon of Canterbury. He entered the King's School, Canterbury, in 1788, matriculated at Trinity College, Oxford on 8 July 1797 and became fellow of his college on 2 June 1807. He graduated B.A. 1801. M.A. 1804, B.D. 1812, and in 1811 was junior proctor of the university. He held the perpetual curacies of St Lawrence Church, Ipswich, and of Hill Farrance, Somerset. He was subsequently presented (28 October 1830) to the vicarage of Navestock in Essex, and died on 31 January 1850. His quaint directions for a funeral of great simplicity were carried out when he was buried in Navestock churchyard. There is a monument to him in Navestock Church, and a portrait of him in the common room of Trinity College, Oxford.

On 19 November 1830 Ford married Lætitia Jermyn, the author of The Butterfly Collector's Vade Mecum. They had no children.

Ford bequeathed £2,000 to the University of Oxford for the endowment of the Ford's Professorship of English History, and £4,000 to Trinity College, Oxford for the purchase of advowsons, and £4,000 for the endowment of four Ford's Studentships, two of which were to be confined to youths educated at King's School, Canterbury.

== Literary work ==
Ford was a collector and compiler on antiquarian subjects. His large collection for a new edition of Philip Morant's History of Essex is in the library of Trinity College, Oxford, and his manuscript collections for a history of bishops from the Revolution onwards were purchased by the British Museum. He was also a contributor to the Gentleman's Magazine and to Nichols's Illustrations of the Literary History of the Eighteenth Century vols. vi. and viii., and was the author of The Devout Communicant (1815), and A Century of Christian Prayers (2nd ed. Ipswich, 1824).

A collection of portraits, drawings, landscapes and illustrations collected by Ford is held by the Suffolk Record Office.

== Bibliographical work ==
Notitia Suffolcienses was a bibliographical work Ford wrote but did not publish
