= William Hepburn Buckler =

French-born scholar, archaeologist, diplomat and lawyer

William Hepburn Buckler FBA
- Born: 1 February 1867; Paris, France
- Died: 2 March 1952 (aged 85)
- Education: Trinity College, Cambridge, University of Maryland
- Occupations: scholar, archaeologist, diplomat, lawyer
- Parents: Dr Thomas Hepburn Buckler (father); Eliza née Ridgely (mother)

William Hepburn Buckler, FBA (1867–1952) was a French-born American classical scholar, archaeologist, diplomat and lawyer. He practised as a lawyer in Baltimore before serving in a number of diplomatic posts, which included service in London during the First World War and membership of the US delegation to the Paris Peace Conference of 1919. While a lawyer, Buckler had developed an interest in archaeology and classical scholarship. He was part of the US archaeological expedition (1910–14) to Sardis in modern-day Turkey and returned there in the 1920s to catalogue and decipher ancient inscriptions uncovered at the site – a project he remained involved with throughout the 1930s. He became an expert in the Lydian language and authored two monographs and three volumes of Monumenta Asiæ Minoris Antiqua. His scholarship was recognised with three honorary doctorates, a Festschrift (co-edited by his colleague W. M. Calder) and fellowship of the British Academy.

== Early life, family and education ==
Born in Paris, France, on 1 February 1867, Buckler was the only son of Eliza née Ridgely (1828–1894), daughter of Thomas and Eliza (Eichelberger) Ridgely of Hampton, Maryland, and her second husband Dr Thomas Hepburn Buckler (1812–1901), who had practised as a physician in his native Baltimore (also in Maryland) until 1866, when he moved to Paris and gained a license to practise there which he renewed until 1890. Through his mother's first husband, the younger Buckler was half-brother to Henry White, who was the US Ambassador to Italy from 1905 to 1907 and to France from 1907 to 1909, and a signatory of the Treaty of Versailles.

== Legal and diplomatic career ==
Buckler came to England for his university education. He was admitted to Trinity College, Cambridge, in 1887 and graduated in 1900 with a Bachelor of Arts degree. He then completed a postgraduate Bachelor of Laws degree the following year and returned to the United States where he studied at the University of Maryland before he began practising law in Baltimore in 1893 or 1894. Sources variously state that he ended his legal practice in 1902, 1904 or 1905; Buckler himself stated 1902. By that time, he had already published two books: The Origin and History of Contract in Roman Law (1894) and Notes on Contracts and Torts of Lunatics (1901); Sales in the Instalment Place (1904), which also examined Roman Law, and Studies in American Trade Unionism (1906) followed. From 1904 to 1912, Buckler was a trustee of Johns Hopkins University.

In 1906, Buckler was appointed secretary to the special US mission to Spain for King Alfonso XIII and Victoria Eugenie of Battenberg's wedding. Thus began a diplomatic career which saw him appointed secretary of the US legation in Madrid the following year, serving until 1909. In 1914, he was appointed a special agent at the US Embassy in London, serving for the duration of the First World War in that capacity. He was part of the American delegation to the Paris Peace Conference in 1919.

== Archaeology ==
Buckler developed an interest in archaeology and classical studies while practising law in Baltimore. After his postings in Spain, he was appointed assistant director of the American expedition to Sardis from 1910 to 1914. By then a series of mostly buried ruins located in the Ottoman Empire, Sardis had been the capital of the ancient kingdom of Lydia, a key city of the Persian and Seleucid empires, the seat of a proconsul under the Roman Empire, and the metropolis of the province Lydia in later Roman and Byzantine times. The American expedition of 1910 was the first large-scale archaeological investigation of the site and revealed a temple to Artemis and more than a thousand Lydian tombs. Buckler helped to finance the work.

The First World War and the Greco-Turkish War prohibited his return until 1922. He and William Moir Calder became leading archaeologists in Asia Minor. In 1923, they co-edited Anatolian Studies Presented to Sir William Mitchell Ramsay (published by Manchester University Press) and Buckler himself authored Lydian Inscriptions (1924) and, with D. M. Robinson, Sardis: Publications of the American Society for the Excavation of Sardis, VII. Greek and Latin Inscriptions (1932). Buckler and Calder carried out further excavations in Asia Minor in 1924 and 1925, which lead to the publication of Monumenta Asiæ Minoris Antiqua, of which he worked with Calder to produce volumes 4 to 6 (published between 1933 and 1939). Buckler became a key scholar of the Lydian language and was primarily responsible for deciphering the inscriptions that were uncovered and published in MAMA.

In the words of one obituary in the American Journal of Archaeology, Buckler did "more than any other American for the exploration and publication of monuments of Asia Minor and Cyprus". He was awarded an honorary DLitt by the University of Oxford in 1925 and honorary LLDs by the University of Aberdeen in 1935 and Johns Hopkins University in 1940. In 1937, he was elected a Fellow of the British Academy, the United Kingdom's national academy for the humanities, and was the subject of a Festschrift, Anatolian Studies presented to William Hepburn Buckler (1939) which was edited by Calder and Josef Keil. In 1939, an issue of Byzantion was dedicated to him and his wife, Georgina Grenfell, née Walrond (died 1953), CBE, daughter of the civil servant Theodore Walrond, CB, who was a noted scholar in her own right.

Buckler died on 2 March 1952.
