= William of Nottingham II =

English Franciscan friar

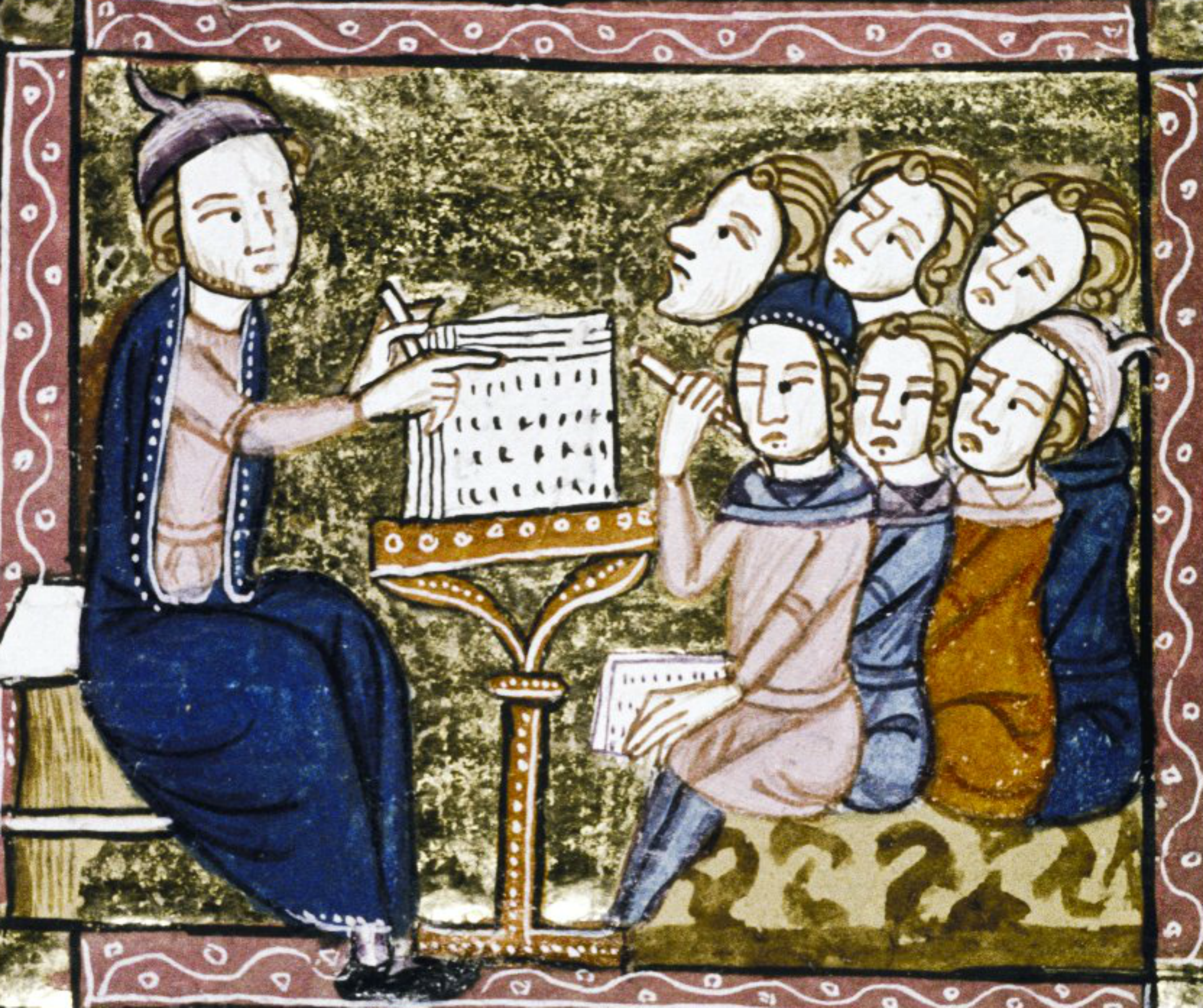
William lecturing to his students from a lectern, from a c. 1350 manuscript of his Commentary on the Gospels inscribed by "Jacobus le Palmer".

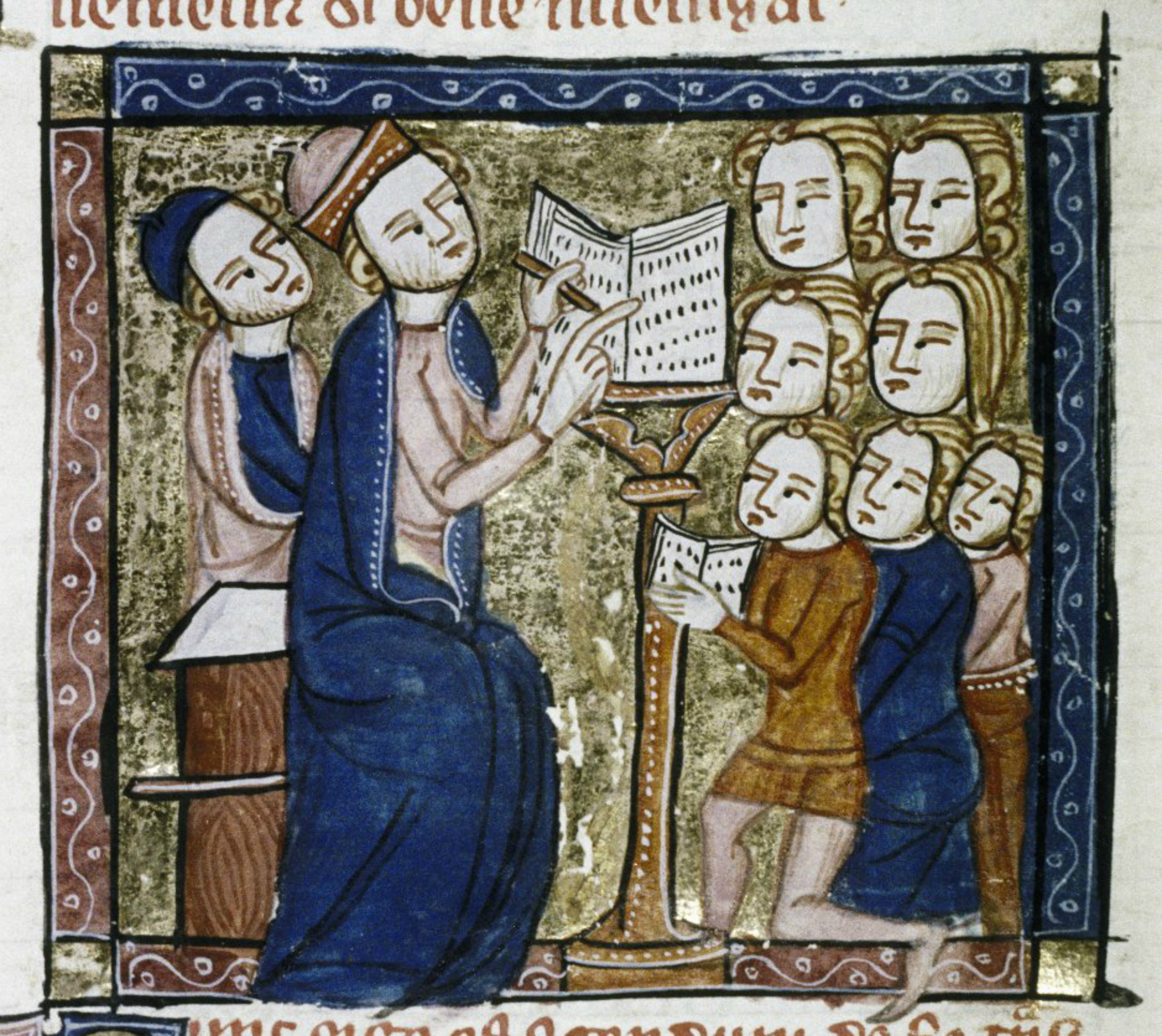
William lecturing his students

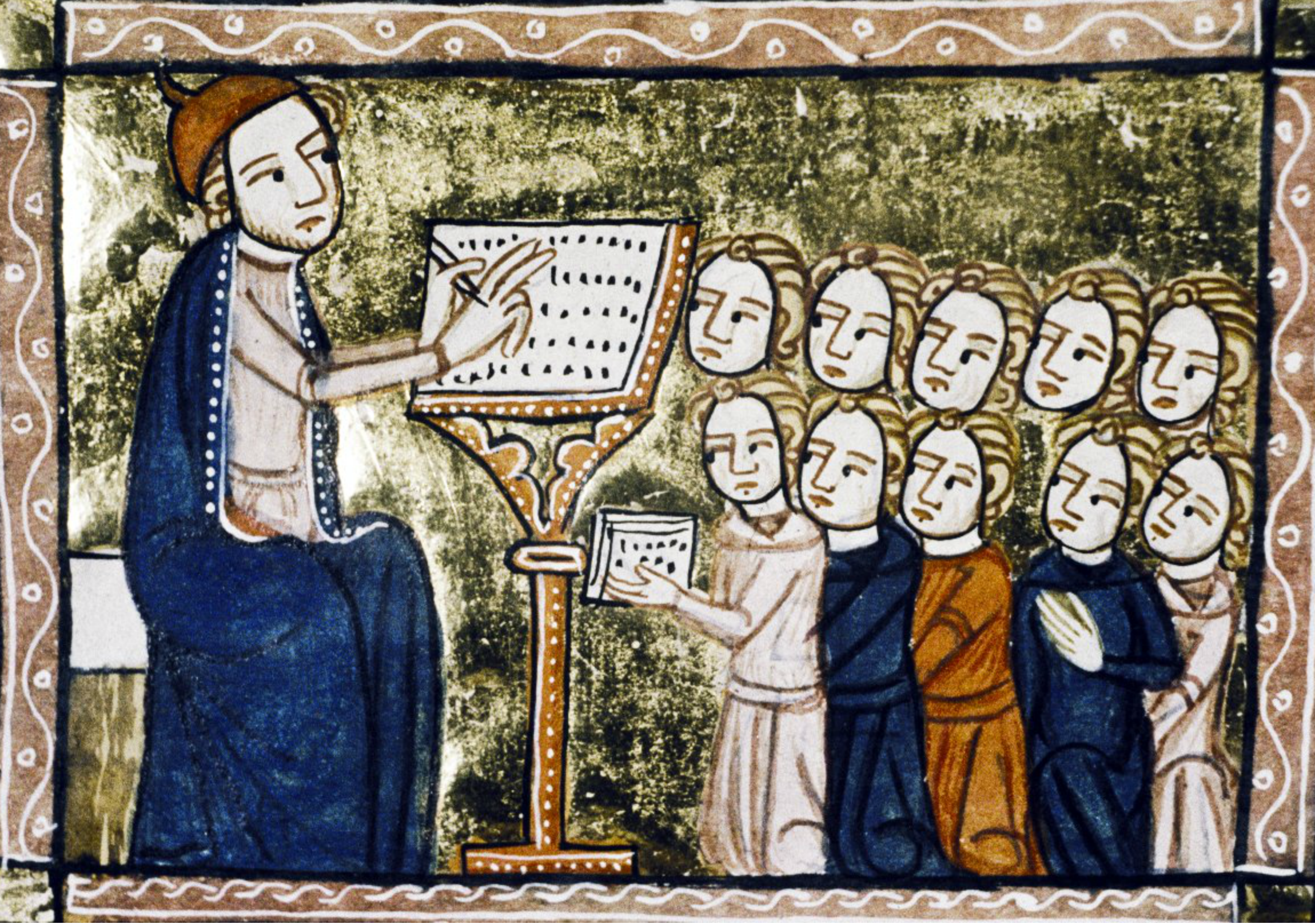
William lecturing his students

William of Nottingham, OFM (Latin: Guilelmus de Nottingham or Nothingham; d. 1330 x 1336) was an English Franciscan friar who served as the seventeenth Minister Provincial of England (c. 1316–1330).

== Life ==
From 1312 to 1314, William served as the 39th reader (Latin: lector) at the Franciscan college at Oxford. He later succeeded Richard of Conington, becoming the 17th Minister Provincial of England (Note: In some sources, he is the 19th or 21st in order, two additional friars given as succeeding Peter of Tewkesbury and/or Adam of Lincoln.) (c. 1316–1330). William attended the Franciscan General Chapter in 1322 and had royal permission to travel abroad in 1324 and 1325. In 1330, he was ordered by Pope John XXII to extradite the friars Peter de Saxlingham, John de Hequinton, Henry de Costeseye, and Thomas de Helmedon. They were all arrested at Cambridge on charges of heresy.

William died in Leicester sometime between 1330 and 1336 (Note: Bale cited by Smalley.) and was buried in the same Greyfriars cemetery that later held Richard III. For a time, it was thought that his body may have been the one discovered in a double stone-and-lead coffin near Richard III's remains. However, continued investigation established that tomb belonged to an as-yet-unknown elderly woman.

He was succeeded as Minister Provincial by Roger of Denemed.

== Works ==
William was the actual author of the Commentary on the Gospels that was formerly attributed to the earlier William of Nottingham. (Note: As, for instance, by A.G. Little.) Based on Clement of Llanthony's One from Four, the postill was well known for centuries and survives in numerous manuscripts. (Note: Including Royal MS 4 E II, Laud. Misc. 165, and Merton MSS 156 & 157.)

His Sentences (Latin: Sententiae) survives in a single copy and preserves various statements made by John Duns Scotus and his classmates while at Oxford, where they immediately preceded William. One section thoroughly and temperately covers the scholastic opinions on the eternity of the world prior to the 1316 disputation, reaching the conservative conclusion that nothing truly infinite exists within God's Creation.

In his capacity as the Franciscan lector at Oxford, he was responsible for copying five large volumes of postills for Sir Hugh of Nottingham, who was a clerk at the Royal Exchequer.

== Gallery ==
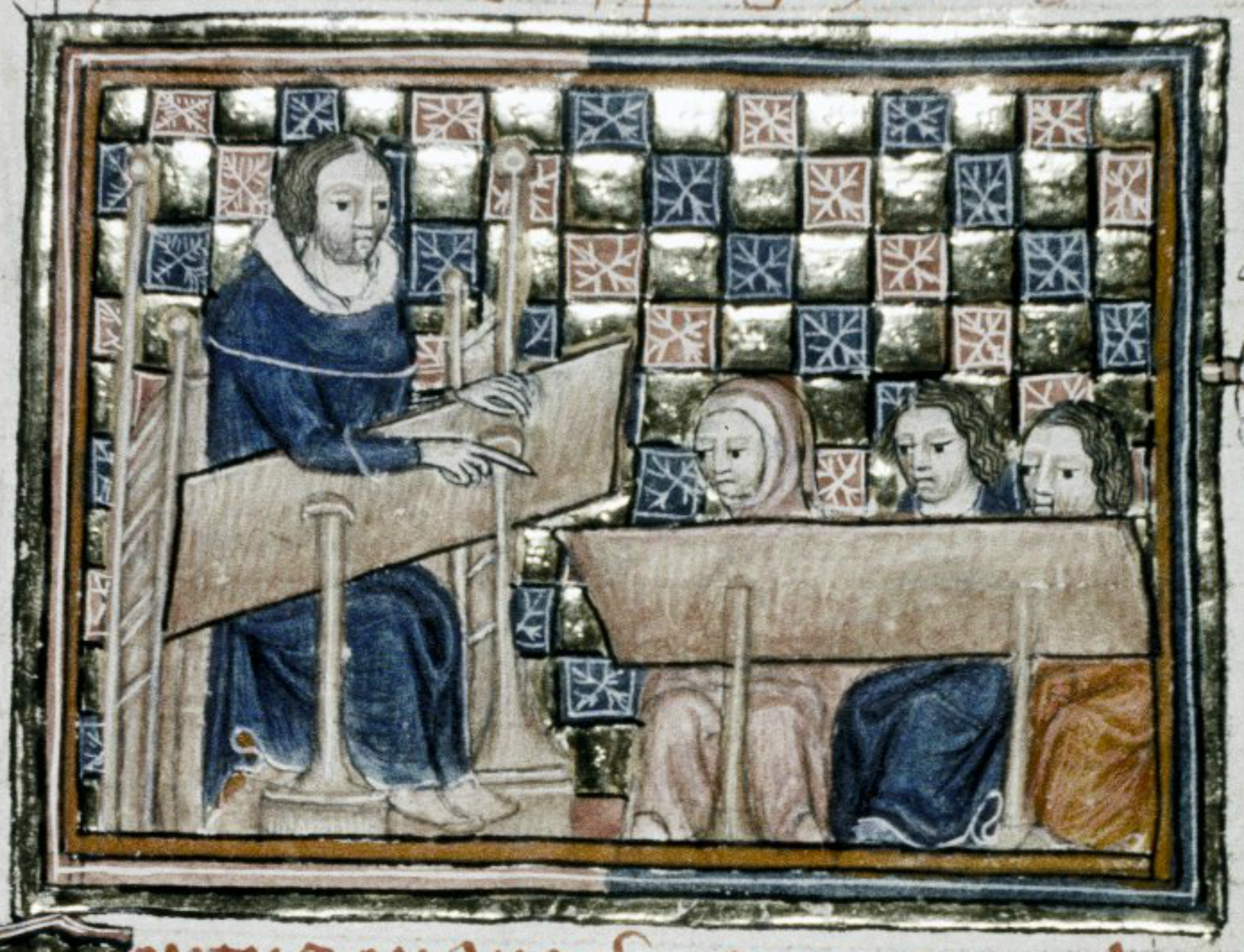
William lecturing his students.

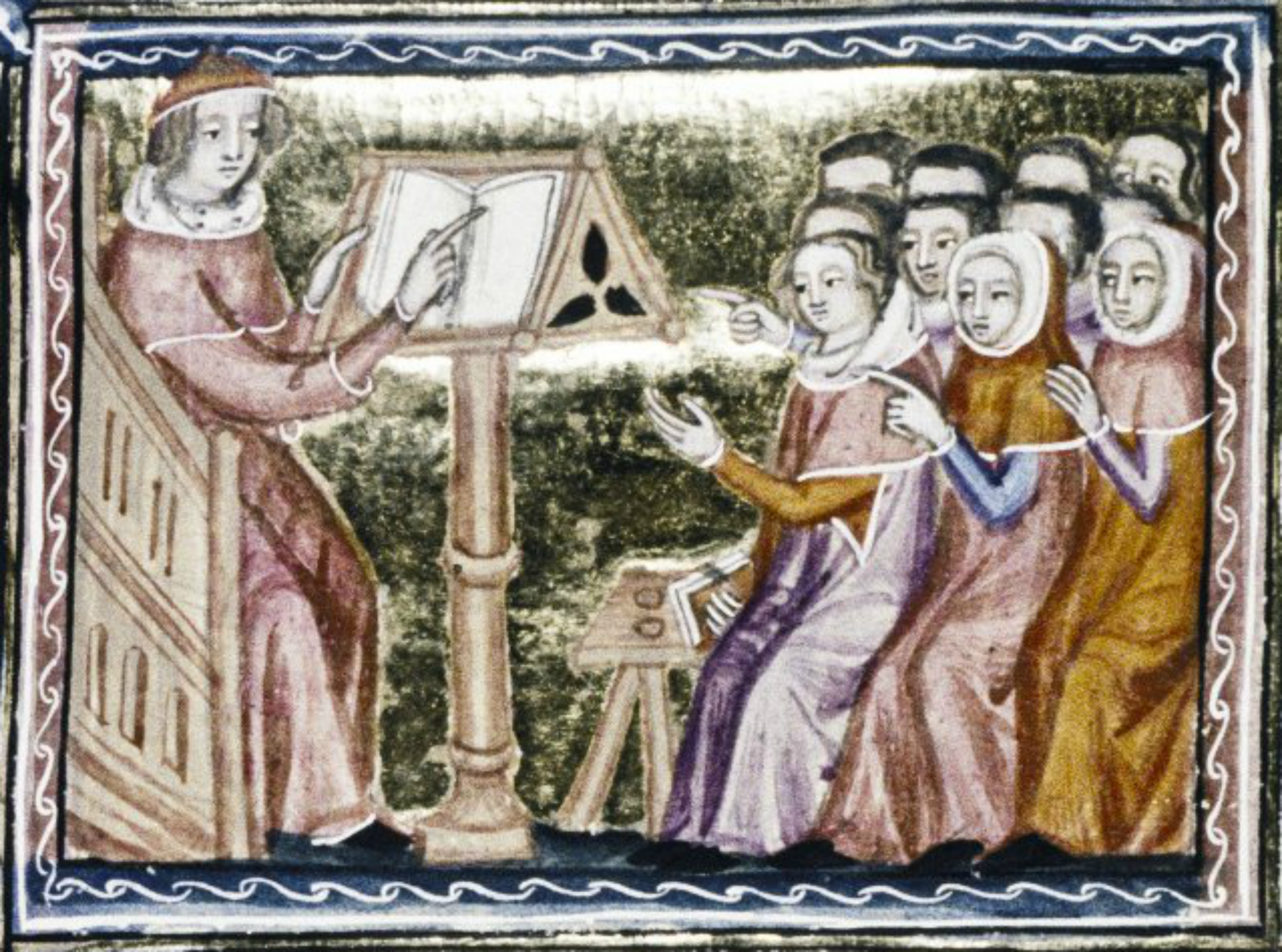
William lecturing his students.

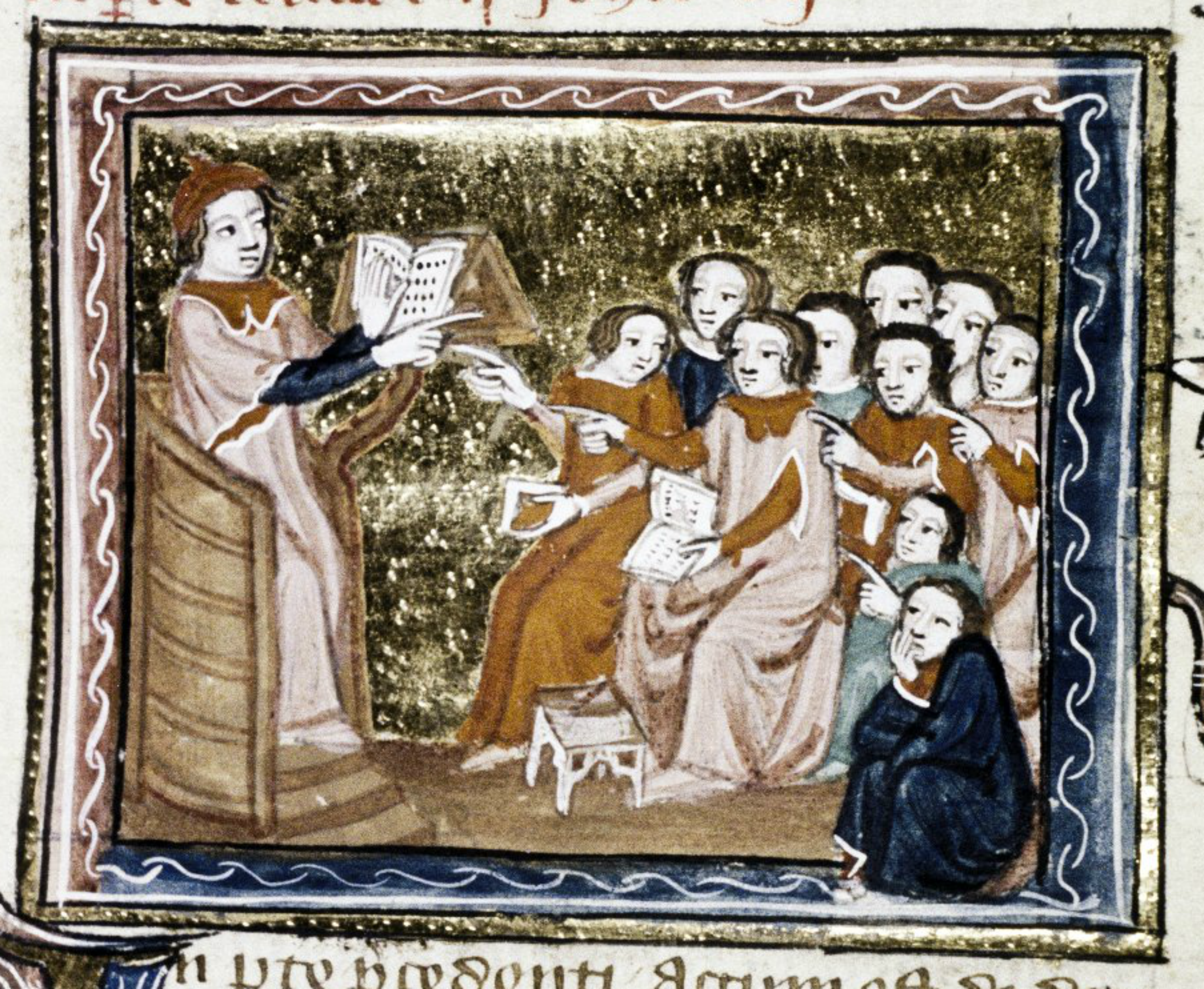
William lecturing his students.

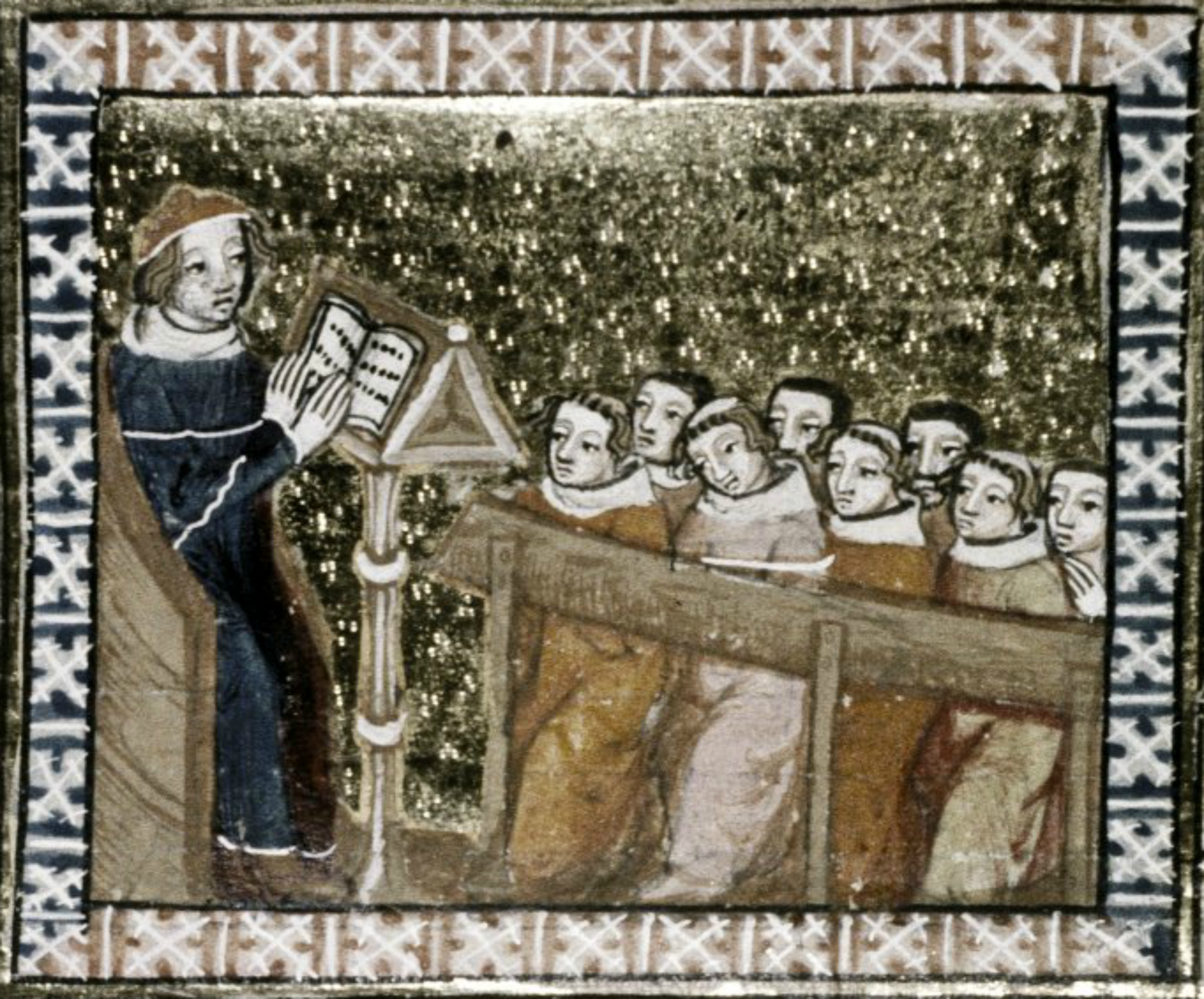
William lecturing his students.

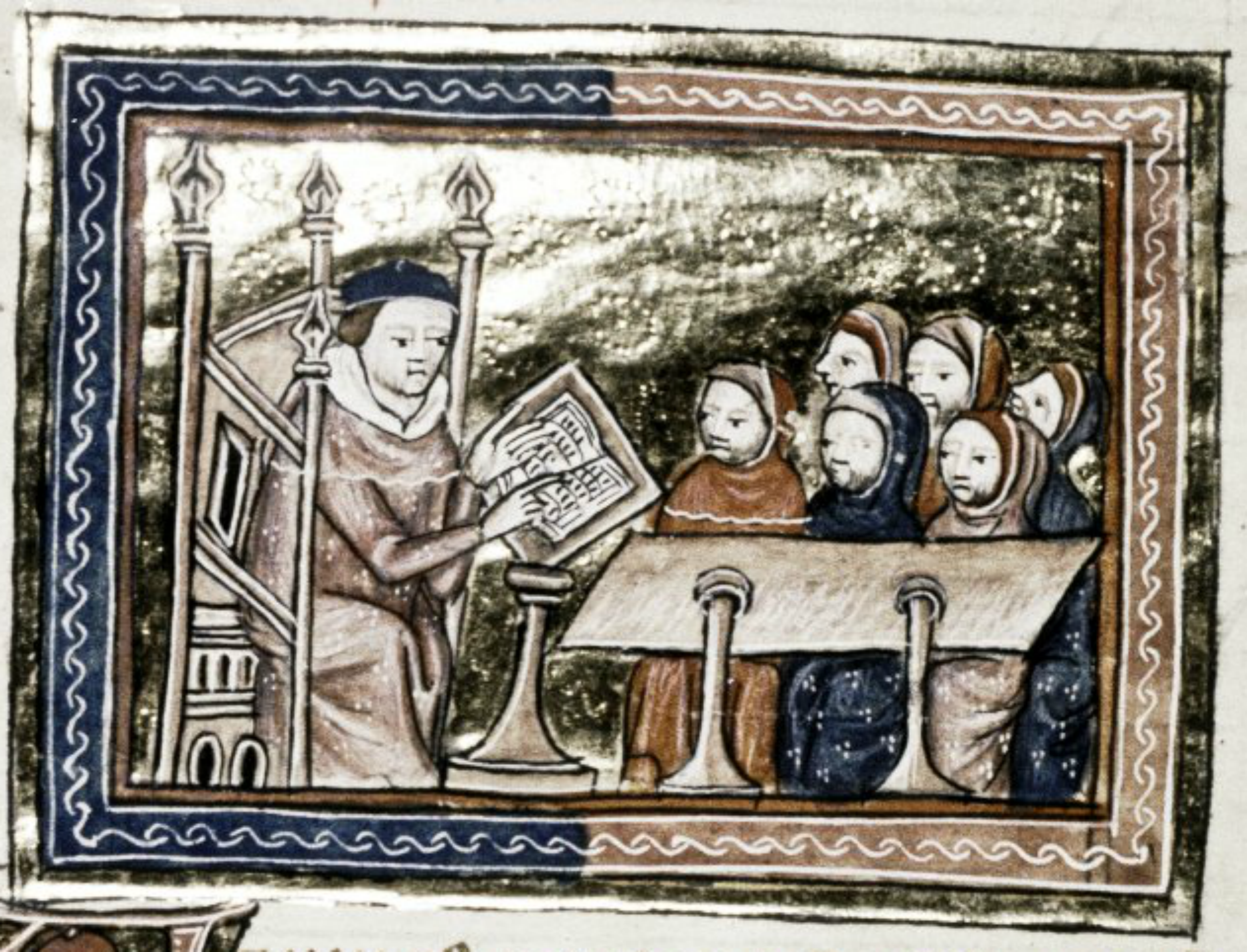
William lecturing his students.

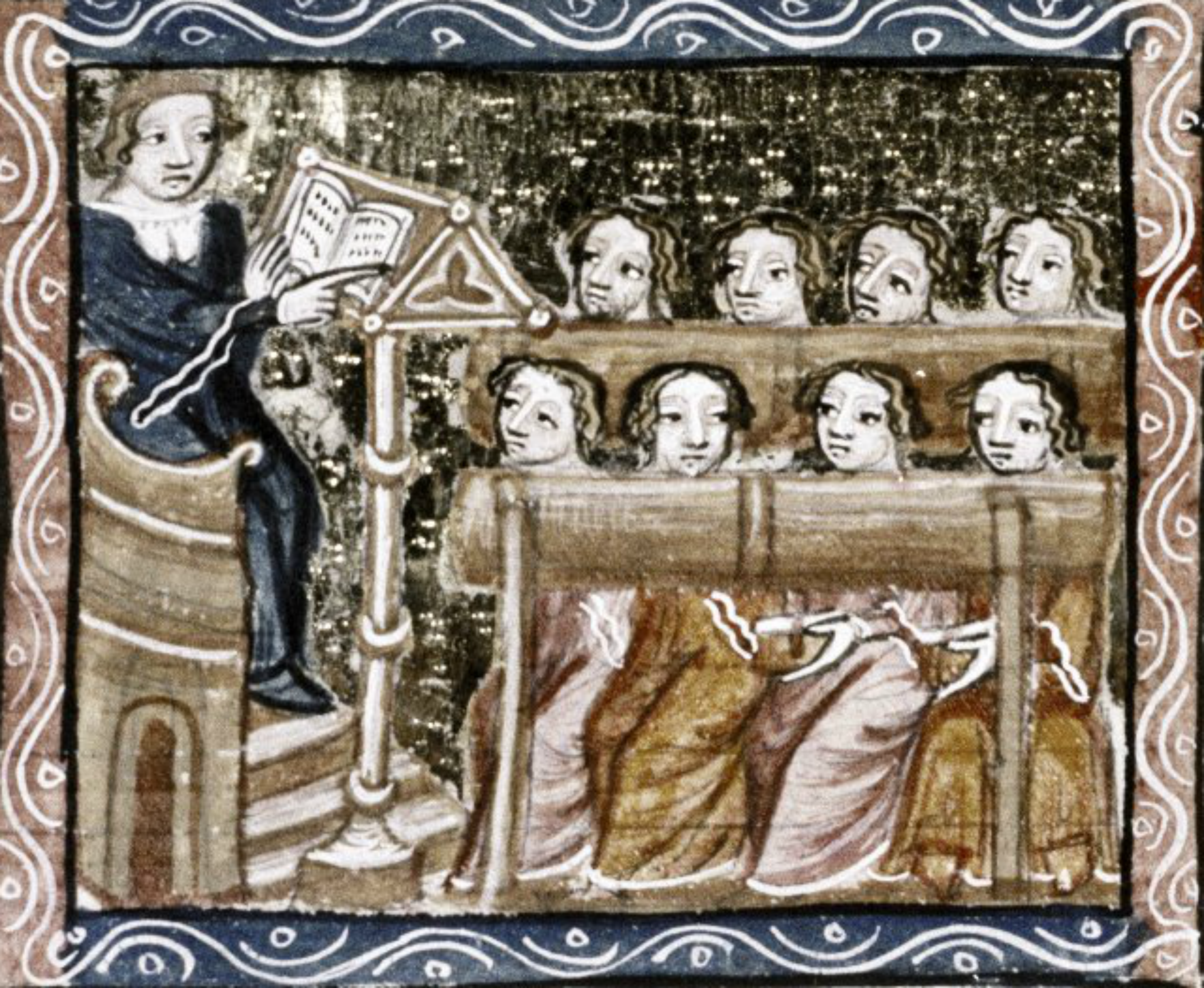
William lecturing his students.
