= Charles Webster (historian) =

British historian (1886–1961)

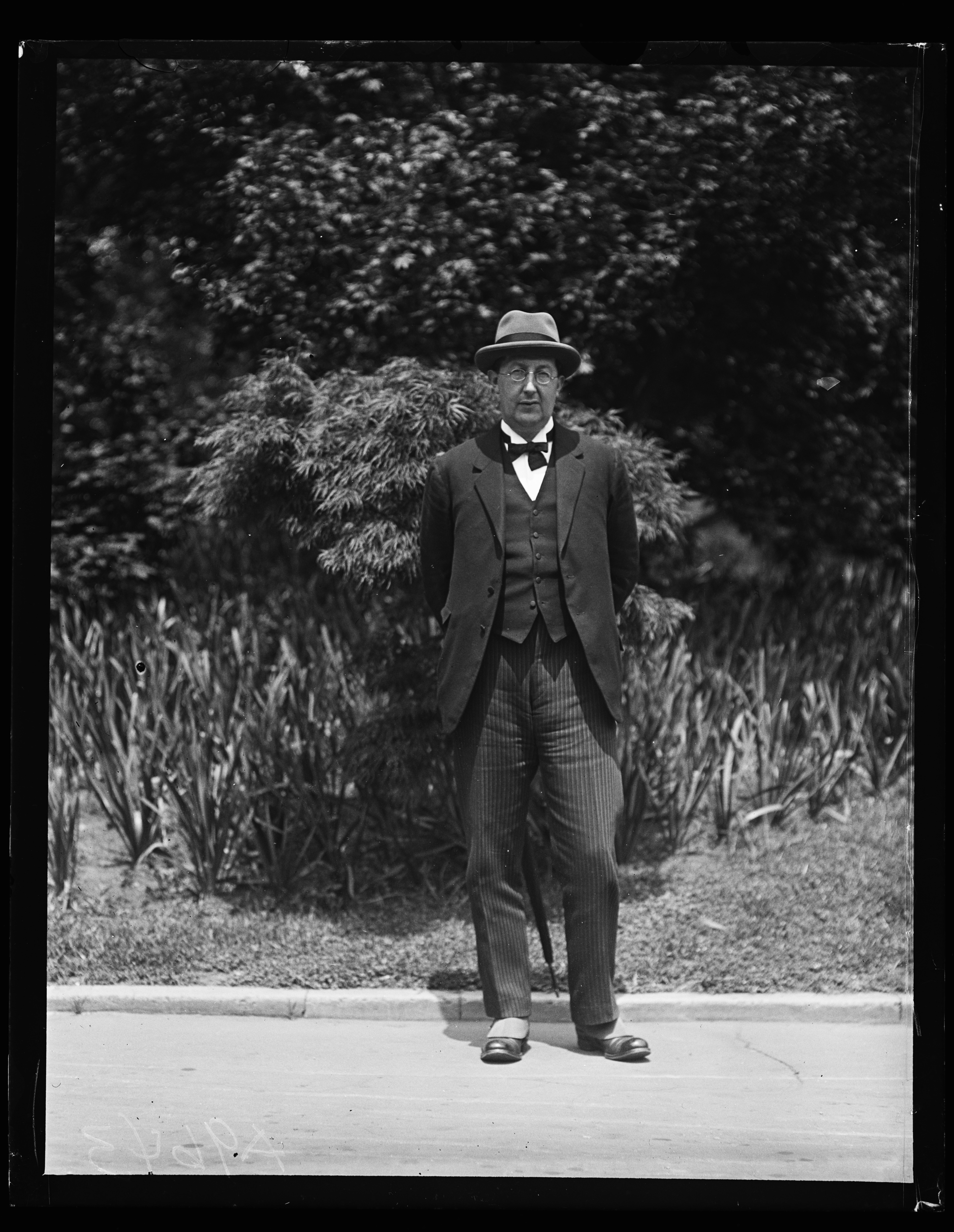
- Webster in 1925
- Born: 25 July 1866
- Died: 1961 (aged 95)
- Education: King's College, Cambridge
- Awards: Knight Commander of the Order of St Michael and St George; Honorary Fellow of King's College, Cambridge

Sir Charles Kingsley Webster KCMG FBA (25 July 1886 – August 1961) was a British diplomat and historian. He was educated at Merchant Taylors' School, Crosby and King's College, Cambridge. After leaving Cambridge University, he went on to become a professor at Harvard, Oxford, and the London School of Economics (LSE). He also served as President of the British Academy from 1950 to 1954.

In addition to his career in academia, Webster worked extensively in the Foreign Office, especially in the United States, and was a leading supporter of the new United Nations, as he had been of the League of Nations.

== Life ==
After studying at Cambridge, Webster became professor of international relations at the University of Wales, Aberystwyth where he wrote his two major books on the foreign policy of Lord Castlereagh, the first (published in 1925) covering the period 1815–1822, the second (published in 1931) that from 1812 to 1815. In 1932 Webster moved to the newly established Stevenson chair of international relations at the LSE.

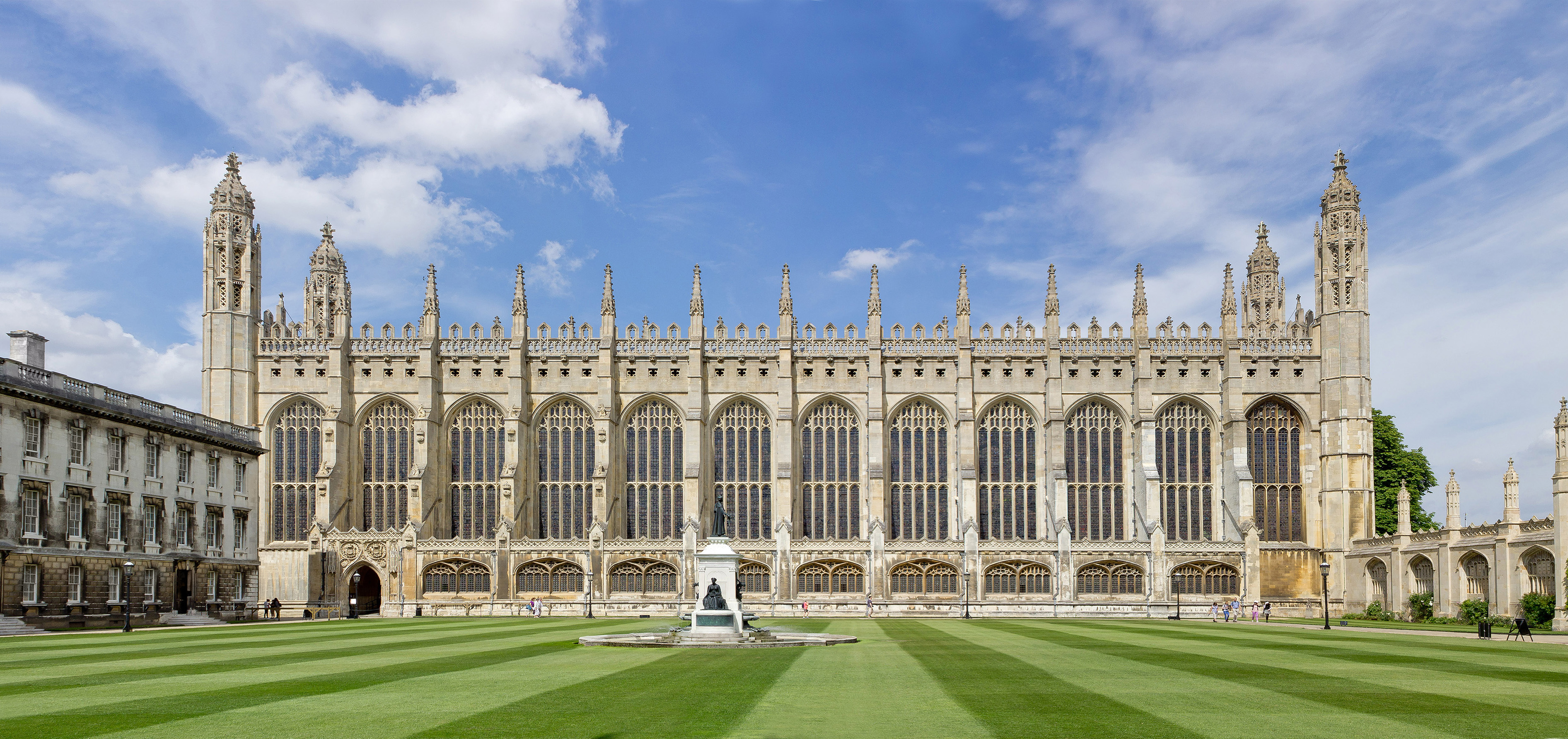
King's College, University of Cambridge

During World War II, he worked extensively in the Foreign Office, especially in the United States, and was a leading supporter of the new United Nations, as he had been of the League of Nations. He was involved in the drafting of the UN Charter.

He attended the first meetings of both the General Assembly and the Security Council in January 1946 and the final meeting of the League of Nations in April. He was made a Knight Commander of the Order of St Michael and St George in the new year's honours list of 1946.

== Career ==
In 1948, Webster gave the Ford Lectures at Oxford University. In 1951, his biography of Henry John Temple, 3rd Viscount Palmerston was finally published. He was President of the British Academy in 1950. He was awarded honorary degrees from Oxford, Cambridge, Wales, Rome, and Williams College, Massachusetts, and was made an honorary fellow of King's College, Cambridge. He retired from his chair at the LSE in 1953.

- Professor of Modern History, Liverpool University, 1914–1922
- Subaltern in the Royal Army Service Corps, 1915–1917
- General Staff of the War Office, 1917–1918
- Secretary, Military Section, British Delegation to the Conference of Paris, 1918–1919
- Wilson Professor of International Politics, University of Wales, 1922–1932
- Außerordentlicher (=Associate) Professor, University of Vienna, 1926
- Nobel Lecturer, Oslo, 1926
- Reader, University of Calcutta, India, 1927
- Professor of History, Harvard University, USA, 1928–1932
- Stevenson Professor of International History, London School of Economics and Political Science, 1932–1953
- Foreign Research and Press Service, 1939–1941
- Director, British School of Information, New York, 1941–1942
- Foreign Office, 1943–1946
- Member of British Delegation, Dumbarton Oaks and San Francisco Conferences, 1944–1945
- Member, Preparatory Commission and General Assembly, United Nations, 1945–1946
- Ford Lecturer, Oxford University, 1948
- President, 1950–1954, and Foreign Secretary, 1955–1958, British Academy

== Works ==
- The Congress of Vienna, 1814–1815, London: Foreign Office Historical Section, 1919
- The Congress of Vienna, Oxford University Press, 1919 (with copyedit instructions, 1934), online at Internet Archive
- British diplomacy, 1813–1815 : select documents dealing with the reconstruction of Europe, 1921, 409p, online at Internet Archive
- The pacification of Europe, 1813–1815, 1922
- The Congress of Vienna, 1814–15, and the Conference of Paris, 1919, London, 1923
- The Foreign Policy of Castlereagh (1815–1822) Britain and the European Alliance, London: G. Bell and Sons, 1925, online at Internet Archive
- The European alliance, 1815–1825, University of Calcutta, 1929
- What the world owes to President Wilson, London: League of Nations Union, 1930
- The League of Nations in theory and practice, London: Allen and Unwin, 1933
- Palmerston, Metternich and the European system, 1830–1841, London: Humphrey Milford, London, 1934
- Editor of British diplomatic representatives, 1789–1852, London, 1934
- Editor of Britain and the independence of Latin America, 1812–1830, London: Ibero-American Institute of Great Britain, 1938
- Some problems of international organisation, University of Leeds, 1943
- Editor of Some letters of the Duke of Wellington to his brother, William Wellesley-Pole, London, 1948
- The Foreign Policy of Palmerston, 1830–1841: Britain, the Liberal Movement, and the Eastern Question, 1951, online edition of vol 2
- The art and practice of diplomacy, London School of Economics, 1952, online
- British Foreign Policy since the Second World War
- The founder of the national home, Weizmann Science Press of Israel, 1955
- Sanctions: the use of force in an international organisation, London, 1956
- The strategic air offensive against Germany, 1939–1945, London, Her Majesty's Stationery Office, 1961, coauthor, 3 volumes, official history

== Sources ==
- Fagg, John Edwin. "Sir Charles Webster 1886– " in S. William Helperin, ed., Some 20th century historians (1961) pp 171–200.
- Hall, Ian. "The art and practice of a diplomatic historian: Sir Charles Webster, 1886–1961." International Politics 42.4 (2005): 470–490.
- Reynolds, P. A. and E. J. Hughes, The historian as diplomat: Charles Kingsley Webster and the United Nations, 1939–1946, (1976).
