= Robert Warden Lee =

English academic lawyer (1868–1958)

- Portrait by Walter Stoneman, 1958
- Born: 14 December 1868; Hanmer, Flintshire, Wales
- Died: 6 January 1958 (aged 89); London, England
- Occupation: Lawyer
- Spouse: Amice Anna Botham (m. 1914)
- Children: 1

Academic background
- Education: Rossall School
- Alma mater: Balliol College, Oxford

Academic work
- Institutions: Worcester College, Oxford; McGill University; All Souls College, Oxford
- Main interests: Roman-Dutch law

Robert Warden Lee, FBA (14 December 1868 – 6 January 1958) was a British lawyer, Rhodes Professor of Roman-Dutch law, and fellow of All Souls College, Oxford.

== Life and career ==
Robert Warden Lee was born in Hanmer, Flintshire, the son of a vicar, the Revd Matthew Henry Lee. He was educated at Rossall School, followed by Balliol College, Oxford, where he was awarded a double first in classics. Following his graduation in 1891, he worked in the Ceylon Civil Service, during which time he developed an interest in Roman-Dutch law, the legal system of British Ceylon.

Lee was called to the bar by Gray's Inn in 1896. He practiced before the Privy Council, mainly in appeals from Ceylon. He also taught law at Worcester College, Oxford, where he was made fellow in 1903. He became the chair of Roman-Dutch law at London University in 1906. In 1914, he became dean of the Law Faculty of McGill University in Montreal. In 1921, Lee returned to the University of Oxford as its first professor of Roman-Dutch law, and as a Fellow of All Souls. He published multiple books on Roman-Dutch law throughout his career.

In 1914, Lee married Amice Anna Botham, daughter of Sir John Macdonell, King's Remembrancer, with whom he had one daughter, Amice Macdonell, a children's writer. Lee retired from his professorship at Oxford in 1956, at the age of eighty-seven, and died in 1958.

== Collection ==
Lee amassed a collection of rare books, ranging from the 17th to 20th centuries, the majority of which relate to Roman-Dutch law. Some of Lee's collection was bequeathed to the library of Gray's Inn, now designated the Lee Collection. Lee also donated 160 items to the Bodleian Libraries, Oxford.

== Arms ==
Coat of arms of Robert Warden Lee

Notes
Displayed on a painted panel in the hall at Gray's Inn.
Crest
A bear statant erect Sable armed Gules muzzled and with a lead reflexed over the back Proper.
Escutcheon
Azure three bars Or a bend compony Or and Gules on a chief Or two trees eradicated Sable fructed Or.
Motto
Fide Et Constantia
