= Ralph Houlbrooke =

Ralph Houlbrooke is emeritus professor of early modern history at the University of Reading. He is chairman of the Berkshire Record Society.

== Selected publications ==
Publications include:

- (ed). The Letter Book of John Parkhurst, Bishop of Norwich, compiled during the years 1571-5 (Norwich: Norfolk Record Society, 1975)
- Church Courts and the People during the English Reformation, 1520-1570 (Oxford: Oxford University Press, 1979)
- The English Family 1450-1700 (Harlow: Longman, 1984)
- with George Parfitt (eds), The Courtship Narrative of Leonard Wheatcroft, Derbyshire Yeoman (Reading: Whiteknights Press, 1986)
- English Family Life, 1576-1716: an Anthology from Diaries (Oxford: Basil Blackwell, 1988)
- (ed.), Death, Ritual and Bereavement (London: Routledge, 1989)
- Death, Religion and the Family in England, 1480-1750 (Oxford: Clarendon Press, 1998; paperback edition 2000)
- (ed.), James VI and I: Ideas, Authority, and Government (Aldershot: Ashgate, 2006)
