= International Bibliography of Historical Sciences =

- Discipline: History
- Language: English
- Edited by: Massimo Mastrogregori

Publication details
- History: 1930–present
- Publisher: De Gruyter
- Frequency: Annual

Standard abbreviations
- ISO 4: Int. Bibliogr. Hist. Sci.

Indexing
- ISSN: 0074-2015

Links
- Journal homepage

International Bibliography of Historical Sciences (Internationale bibliographie der geschichtswissenschaften / Bibliografia internacional de ciencias historicas / Bibliographie internationale des sciences historiques / Bibliografia internazionale delle scienze storiche) is an international bibliography of the most important historical monographs and periodical articles published throughout the world, which deal with history from the earliest to the most recent times.
IBHS was founded in 1930 by International Committee of Historical Sciences., with the aim of representing a landmark in a rapidly evolving scientific world; his first volumes, published by Armand Colin, were reviewed by the great French historian Marc Bloch. Since its foundation the bibliography has stood out for being purely "selective" and "descriptive" rather than "analytical" and "critical".
Until 1995 IBHS was published in collaboration with UNESCO. Volumes 47–48 (1978/1979) were edited by Michel François and Michael Keul; starting from vol. 49 (1980) and up to vol. 62 (1992) the editors were Jean Glénisson and Michael Keul. From volume 62 (1993) the bibliography is edited by the Italian historian Massimo Mastrogregori, with Carlo Colella as assistant editor, and published by the German publishing house De Gruyter.
