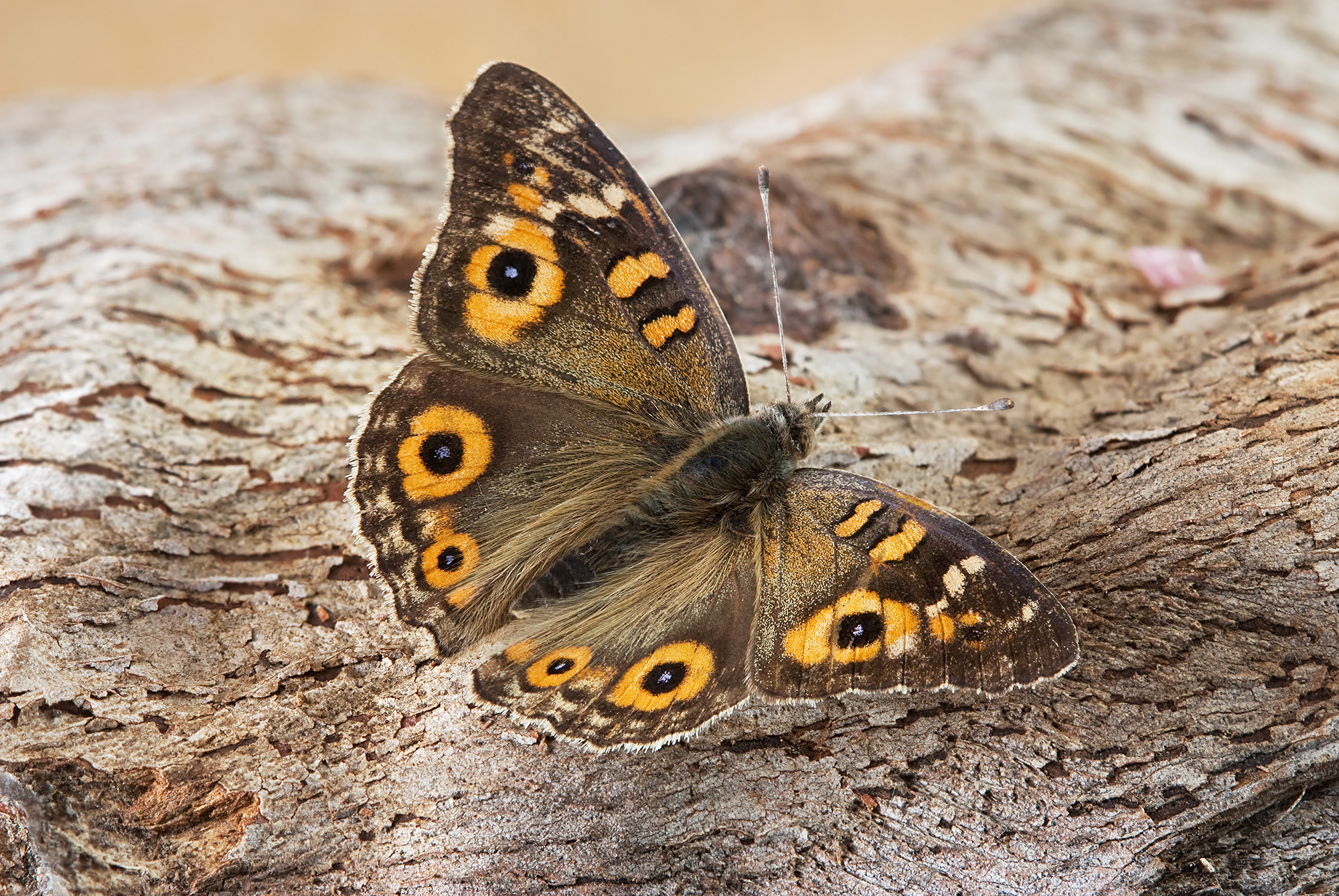
- Upperside of the wings
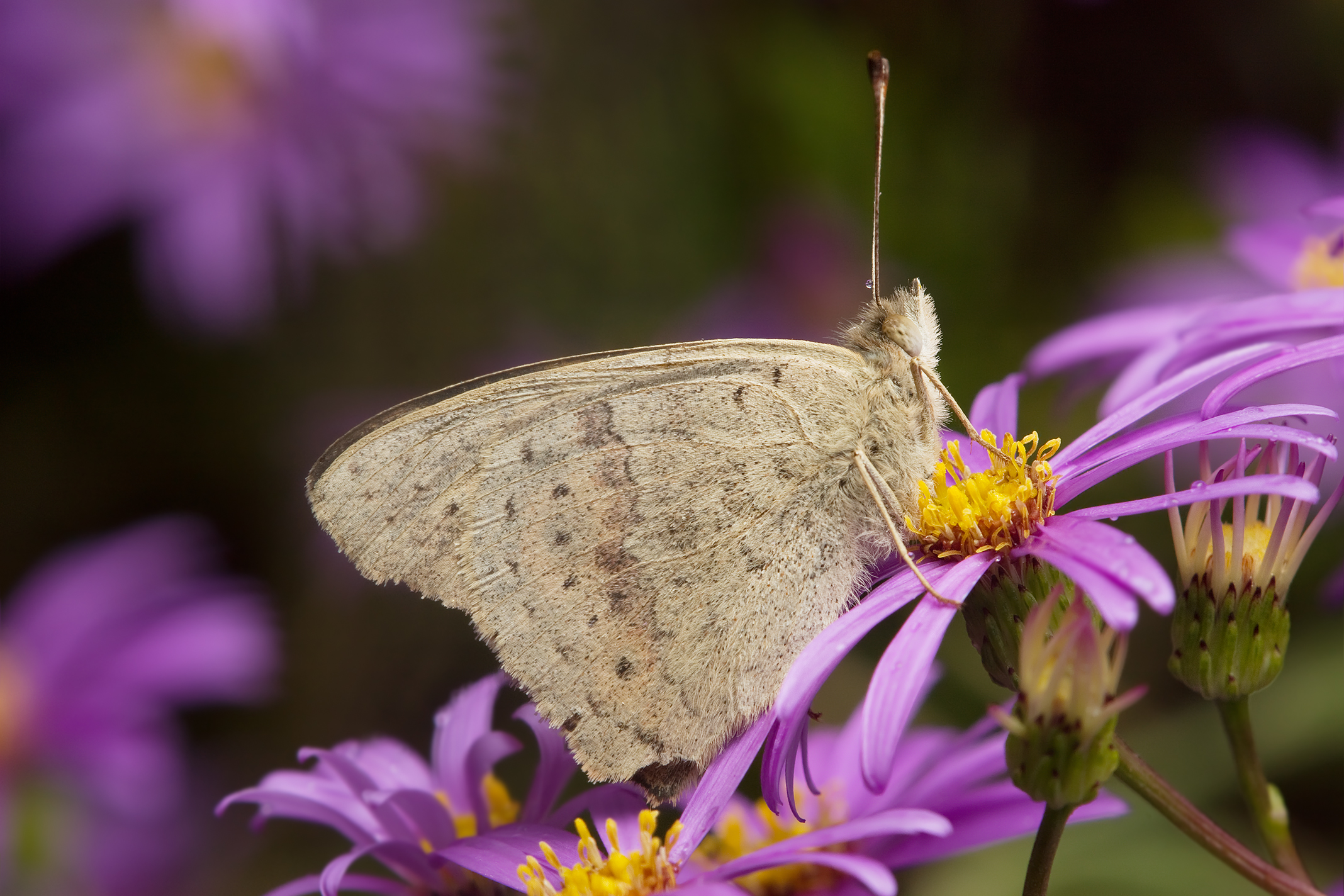
- Underside of the wings

Scientific classification
- Kingdom: Animalia
- Phylum: Arthropoda
- Class: Insecta
- Order: Lepidoptera
- Family: Nymphalidae
- Genus: Junonia
- Species: J. villida

Binomial name
- Junonia villida (Fabricius, 1787)

= Meadow argus =

Butterfly in the family Nymphalidae

The meadow argus (Junonia villida) is a butterfly in the family Nymphalidae, commonly found in Australia and Nelsons Island. It is also known as Albin's Hampstead eye in the United Kingdom, where it has occurred only as an accidental import.

== Description ==
The meadow argus has two brownish wings, each covered with two distinctive black and blue eyespots as well as white and orange marks that appear on the edge of the wings. The eyespots are a defense mechanism that are not only used to frighten predators away, but also to confuse the predators into thinking that the eyespots are the target, allowing the butterfly to escape with only a small part of the wing being lost. The underside of the wings are mainly unmarked, except the lower part of the forewing has similar markings as the upperside. The wingspan measures 4 centimetres (1.6 in) in males and 4.3 centimetres (1.7) in females.

As the butterfly rests, it can sit in four different positions depending on the current situation. These positions include:

- If the sun is shining, the butterfly will open and relax its wings
- If danger approaches while in the sunlight the butterfly will open its wings further revealing eyespots on its hindwings
- If the sun is not shining the butterfly will close its wings
- If danger approaches while there is no sunlight the butterfly will raise its frontwings revealing hidden eyespots

== Distribution and habitat ==
The meadow argus can be found mainly on the Australian mainland, as well as in Tasmania, Kangaroo Island, Lord Howe Island, New Zealand, Norfolk Island, Fiji, Papua New Guinea, Indonesia, Tuvalu, Samoa and Cook Islands. While sightings of this butterfly are now rare in New Zealand, in late 1886 thousands of the butterflies drifted to the country, crossing the Tasman Sea. They reside in urban areas, forests, woodlands, grasslands, and roadsides, though they are uncommon during the winter months. Every year during October or November, the butterflies migrate from southern Australia to warmer areas in the north.

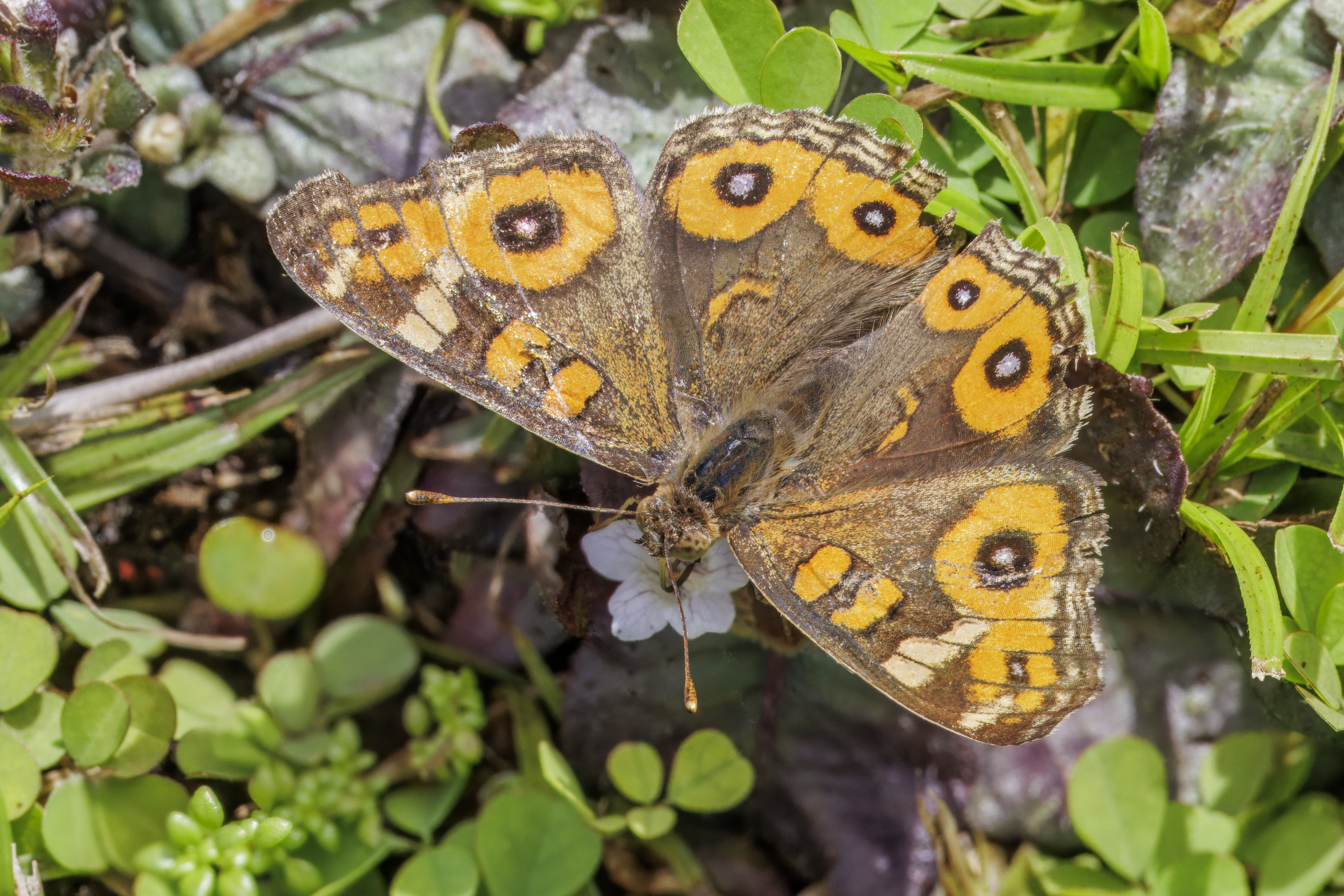
in Samoa

== Early stages ==
=== Eggs ===
Meadow argus eggs are laid on a leaf of the food plant, shaped with sturdy vertical and horizontal ribs. The eggs usually hatch within 7 to 10 days.

=== Larvae ===
Meadow argus larvae are black with short thin spines. Meadow argus caterpillars feed on various garden plants, both native and introduced. This includes Plantago, Scrophulariaceae, Convolvulaceae, Compositae, Verbenaceae, Porulacaceae, and Gentianaceae. This stage lasts from 4 to 5 weeks.

=== Pupae ===
Meadow argus pupae have various colours, though usually they are black dotted with white and reddish yellow. This stage lasts from 2 to 3 weeks.

== See also ==
- Common buckeye (Junonia coenia)
