= Berkshire Record Society =

Text publication society

The Berkshire Record Society is a text publication society founded in 1993 to produce scholarly editions of important documents relating to the history of Berkshire, England, held at the Royal Berkshire Archives and elsewhere. It is a registered charity.

The society's chairman is Ralph Houlbrooke. The general editor is Anne Curry, who took over from the founding general editor, Peter Durrant.

In addition to its series of annual titles, the Berkshire Record Society published An Historical Atlas of Berkshire (Second Edition, 2012) edited by Joan Dils and Margaret Yates, with maps by Clive Brown.

== Publications ==
Year	Editor(s)	Vol.	Title of publication
2025	Chris Skidmore	32	Early Quaker Controversy in Reading. The Minute Books of the Two Reading Monthly Meetings, 1668-1716
2024	Malcolm Summers	31	Greyfriars, Reading: From Prison to Parish Church
2024	Stuart Eagles	30	Medicine and Society in Late Eighteenth-Century Berkshire: The Commonplace Book of William Savory of Brightwalton and Newbury
2023	Joan Dils	29	Stanford in the Vale Churchwardens' Accounts 1552–1705
2022	David Lewis	28	Living in Tudor Windsor: The Records of the Sixteenth-Century Town
2021	Peter Durrant	27	Hungerford Overseers' Accounts 1655–1834
2019	Sue Clifford	26	Berkshire Schools in the Eighteenth Century
2018	Brian Kemp	25	Reading Abbey Records: A New Miscellany
2017	Margaret Yates	24	Berkshire Feet of Fines 1307–1509: Part II – Fines 1400–1509 and Index
2017	Margaret Yates	23	Berkshire Feet of Fines 1307–1509: Part I – Fines 1307–1399
2017	Jeremy Sims	22	Newbury and Chilton Pond Turnpike Records 1766–1791
2015	Sabina Sutherland	21	The Church Inspection Notebook of Archdeacon James Randall 1855–1873 and other records
2013	Joan Dils	20	Reading St Laurence Churchwardens' Accounts, 1498–1570: Part I – Accounts 1536–1570 and Inventories
2013	Joan Dils	19	Reading St Laurence Churchwardens' Accounts, 1498–1570: Part I – Introduction and Accounts 1498–1536
2012	Harry Leonard	18	Diaries and Correspondence of Robert Lee of Binfield 1736–1744
2010	Pat Naylor	17	Berkshire Archdeaconry Probate Index, 1480–1652 (Part III: Occupations)
2011	Pat Naylor	16	Berkshire Archdeaconry Probate Index, 1480–1652 (Part II: Place Names)
2011	Pat Naylor	15	Berkshire Archdeaconry Probate Index, 1480–1652 (Part I: Personal Names)
2010	Kate Tiller	14	Berkshire Religious Census 1851
2008	Ronald & Margaret Pugh	13	The Diocese Books of Samuel Wilberforce
2008	Jeremy Sims	12	Thames Navigation Commission Minutes, 1771–1790 (Part I)
2008	Jeremy Sims	11	Thames Navigation Commission Minutes, 1771–1790 (Part I)
2005	Lisa Spurrier	10	Berkshire Nonconformist Meeting House Registrations, 1689–1852 (Part I)I
2005	Lisa Spurrier	09	Berkshire Nonconformist Meeting House Registrations, 1689–1852 (Part I)
2004	Christine Jackson	08	Newbury Kendrick Workhouse Records, 1627–1641
2002	Cecil Slade	07	Reading Gild Accounts, 1357–1516 (Part II)
2002	Cecil Slade	06	Reading Gild Accounts, 1357–1516 (Part I)
2000	Ross Wordie	05	Enclosure in Berkshire, 1485–1885
1999	Ian Mortimer	04	Berkshire Probate Accounts, 1583–1712
1997	Peter Durrant	03	Berkshire Overseers' Papers, 1654–1834
1995	Ian Mortimer	02	Berkshire Glebe Terriers, 1634
1994	Gillian Clark	01	Correspondence of the Foundling Hospital Inspectors in Berkshire, 1757–1768
