= Theophilus Houlbrooke =

British minister and botanist

Rev Theophilus Houlbrooke FRSE LLB (1745–1824) was a British minister remembered mainly as an amateur botanist. He served as President of the Liverpool Athenaeum from 1809 until 1813, and was Vice President of the Botanic Gardens in Liverpool. He resigned his living in order to become a Unitarian.

== Life ==
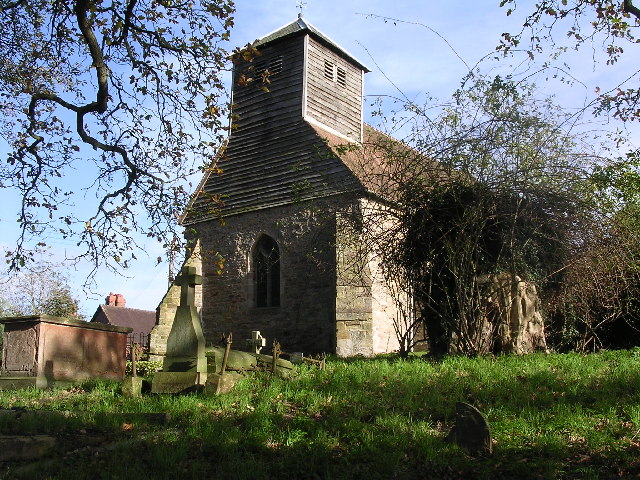
Houlbrooke's church at Stockton-on-Teme

He was born in Lichfield in Staffordshire in 1745. He was educated at Shrewsbury School. He trained as a minister at Cambridge University graduating LLB and was Ordained as a Deacon in Lincoln Cathedral in 1769, whilst also serving of Curate of the nearby church in Little Coates. From 1770 until 1784 he served as rector of the church in Stockton-on-Teme. Around 1785 he left the Church of England to join the Unitarians.

In 1792 he was elected a Fellow of the Royal Society of Edinburgh for his contributions to botany. His proposers were Sir James Hall, John Playfair and Andrew Coventry.

In 1802 he was an invited guest at the opening of the new Botanic Garden in Liverpool under the Presidency of William Roscoe. He was placed on the Committee alongside other illustrious persons such as James Currie FRS. He served as President of the Liverpool Athenaeum from 1809 until 1813. A letter of Houlbrooke's from 22 February 1815 survives, in which he resigns his position as Vice President and withdraws from the committee of the Liverpool Botanic Garden, as he was no longer a resident of Liverpool, having moved to Shrewsbury and then Barnes, Surrey. It was reported that Houlbrooke, described as a friend of Joseph Priestley, had resigned his living to become tutor to the children of William Rathbone, a Quaker abolitionist.

His will, of January 1824, is held by the National Archives at Kew.
