= Ford Lectures =

Annual lectures at Oxford on British history

The Ford Lectures or the James Ford Lectures in British History, are an annual series of public lectures held at the University of Oxford on the subject of English or British history. They are usually devoted to a particular historical theme and usually span six lectures over Hilary term. They are often subsequently published as a book.

== History of the lectureship ==
The lectures are named in honour of their benefactor, James Ford (1779–1851). Ford was educated at King's School, Canterbury, and matriculated at Trinity College, Oxford, in 1797. After graduating in 1801, he went on to his Master of Arts and Bachelor of Divinity degrees. He was a Fellow of Trinity College from 1807 to 1830. His antiquarian collections have been dispersed, but survive in the holdings of the Bodleian Library, the Library of Trinity College, the British Library, and the Cambridge University Library.

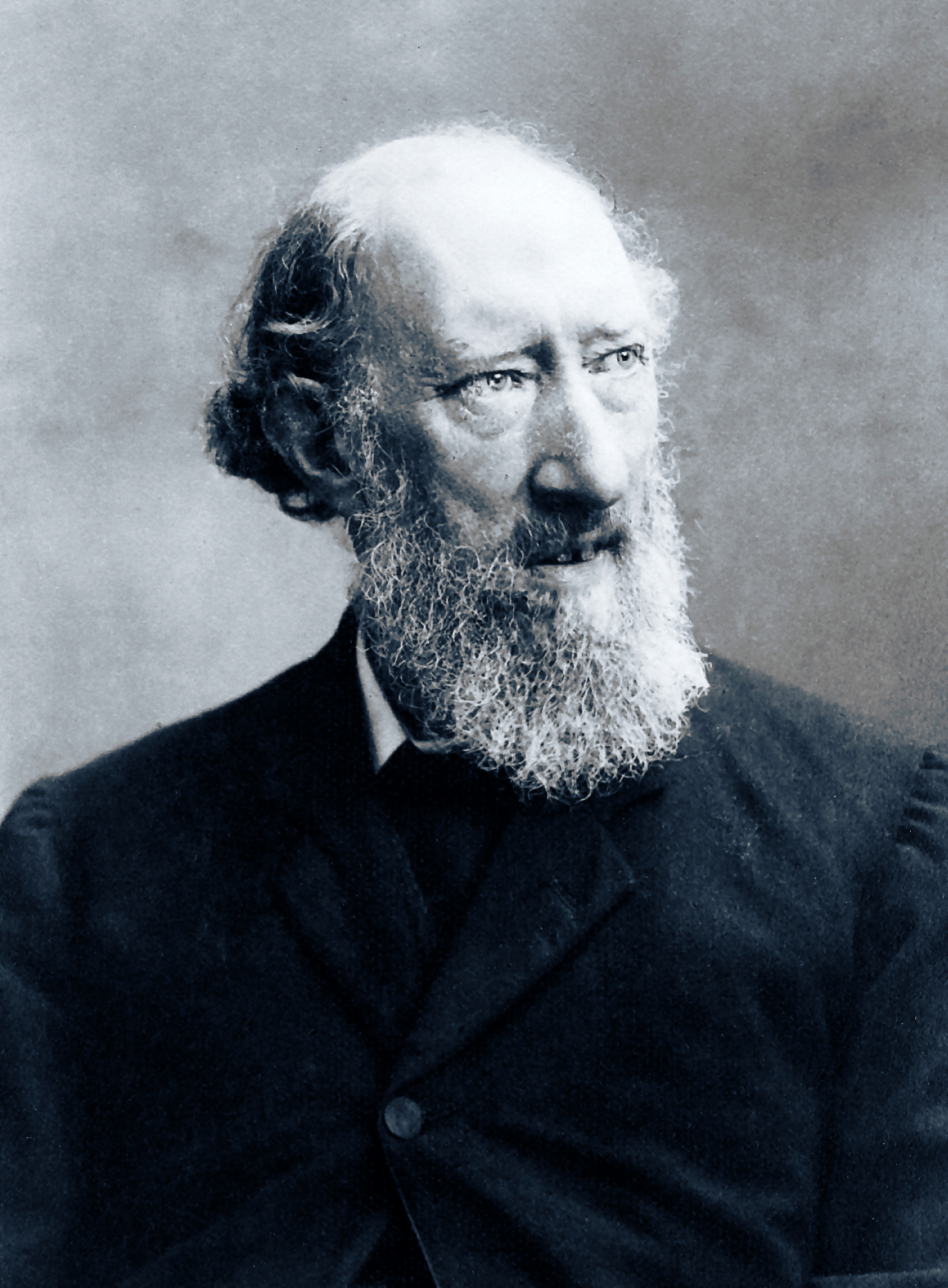
Samuel Rawson Gardiner (1829–1902), who delivered the first Ford Lectures in 1896–7

In his will, Ford left a number of bequests, some of which were held in trust for the support of his surviving siblings. After they had all died, Oxford University received his bequest of £2,000 to fund a professorship of English history, which was to be established when the principal had grown to support payment of £100 per year. When this goal was reached in 1894, the sum was not enough to support a professor at the current stipend. After considerable discussion within the University, the funds were assigned to fund an annual lectureship in English history by a lecturer who was to be chosen annually by a board of electors. The first Ford's Lecturer in English History was S. R. Gardiner, elected for the academic year beginning in 1896. In 1994, the University of Oxford formally changed the official title of the series from "Ford's Lectures in English History" to "Ford's Lectures in British History".

As the lectures may be given in either the Michaelmas or Hilary terms (or partly in both), confusion can arise on publication because either calendar year may be stated. The following list gives the academic year.

=== Reputation ===
The Ford Lectures are generally considered to be the most prestigious public lecture series in British history, attracting high-profile lecturers and attendees. Patrick Collinson, who was the lecturer in the 1978-79 academic year, called the invitation to give the lectures "the best thing that can happen to a historian of these islands".

== Lecturers ==
The following have been Ford Lecturers.

=== To 1899 ===
- 1896–97 S. R. Gardiner, Cromwell's Place in History
- 1897–98 Frederic William Maitland, Township and borough
- 1898–99 Adolphus William Ward, Great Britain and Hanover: some aspects of the personal union
- 1899-1900 James Hamilton Wylie, The Council of Constance to the death of John Hus

=== 1900–1924 ===
- 1900–01 Charles Firth, Cromwell's army: a history of the English soldier during the Civil Wars, the Commonwealth and the Protectorate
- 1901–02 Charles Plummer, The life and times of Alfred the Great
- 1902–03 Julian Corbett, England in the Mediterranean
- 1903–04 Leslie Stephen, English literature and society in the 18th century
- 1904–05 Andrew Lang
- 1905–06 Arthur L. Smith, The Church and State in the Middle Ages
- 1906–07 Francis Haverfield, The Roman Occupation of Britain
- 1907–08 Alfred Comyn Lyall
- 1908–09 Arthur Johnson, The Disappearance of the Small Landowner
- 1909–10 George Edmundson, Anglo-Dutch rivalry during the first half of the 17th century
- 1910–11 John William Fortescue, British Statesmen of the Great War, 1793–1814
- 1911–12 Reginald L. Poole, The Exchequer in the Twelfth Century
- 1912–13 T. F. Tout, The place of the reign of Edward II in English history
- 1913–14 Peter Hume Brown, The legislative union of England and Scotland
- 1914–15 Andrew George Little, Studies in English Franciscan History
- 1915–16 No Election
- 1916–17 A. G. Little, Studies in English Franciscan History
- 1917–18 No Election
- 1918–19 No Election
- 1919–20 John E. Lloyd
- 1920–21 Arthur Frederic Basil Williams
- 1921–22 Sir Richard Lodge, Great Britain and Prussia in the 18th century
- 1922–23 J. Armitage Robinson, The times of Saint Dunstan
- 1923–24 C. L. Kingsford, Prejudice and promise in 15th century England

=== 1925–1949 ===
- 1924–25 Henry William Carless Davis, The age of Grey and Peel
- 1925–26
- 1926–27 F. M. Powicke, Stephen Langton
- 1927–28 Albert Frederick Pollard
- 1928–29 F. M. Stenton, The First Century of English Feudalism, 1066–1166
- 1929–30 Alfred Francis Pribram, England and the International Policy of the European Great Powers, 1871–1914
- 1930–31 Keith Feiling
- 1931–32 Keith Grahame Feiling, The tories in opposition and in power, 1714–1806
- 1932–33 A. Hamilton Thompson, The English clergy and their organisation in the later Middle Ages
- 1933–34 Lewis Namier, King, Cabinet, and Parliament in the Early Years of George III
- 1934–35 Herbert Edward Salter, Medieval Oxford
- 1935–36 Richard Henry Tawney
- 1936–37 George James Turner
- 1937–38 Harold William Vazeille Temperley
- 1938–39 Eileen Power, The Wool Trade in English Medieval History
- 1939–40 James A. Williamson, The Ocean in English History
- 1940–41 Robin Ernest William Flower
- 1941–42 V. H. Galbraith, Studies in the public records
- 1942–43 Wilhelm Levison, England and the Continent in the Eighth Century
- 1943–44 Admiral Sir Herbert Richmond, Statesmen and Sea Power
- 1944–45 Austin Lane Poole, Obligations of Society in the XII and XIII Centuries
- 1945–46 David Mathew, The Social Structure in Caroline England
- 1946–47 T. F. T. Plucknett, Legislation of Edward I
- 1947–48 Sir Charles Webster
- 1948–49 David Knowles, The episcopal colleagues of Archbishop Thomas Becket
- 1949–50 Ian Richmond

=== 1950–1974 ===
- 1950–51 G. N. Clark, King James I and Dutch "Imperialism" in Asia
- 1951–52 Richard Pares, King George III and the politicians
- 1952–53 K. B. McFarlane, The Nobility of Later Medieval England
- 1953–54 Thomas Southcliffe Ashton
- 1954–55 C. R. Cheney, From Becket to Langton: English church government 1170–1213
- 1955–56 A. J. P. Taylor, The Trouble Makers: Dissent over Foreign Policy, 1792–1939
- 1956–57 Philip Grierson
- 1957–58 Norman Sykes
- 1958–59 Norman Sykes, From Sheldon to Secker: aspects of English church history, 1660–1768
- 1959–60 G. Kitson Clark, The making of Victorian England
- 1960–61 Sir Goronwy Edwards, The second century of the English Parliament
- 1961–62 Christopher Hill, Intellectual Origins of the English Revolution
- 1962–63 D. C. Douglas, William the Conqueror: the Norman impact upon England
- 1963–64 Norman Gash, Reaction and reconstruction in English politics, 1832–1852
- 1964–65 Eleanora Carus-Wilson, The rise of the English woollen industry
- 1965–66 J. H. Plumb The growth of political stability in England: 1675–1725
- 1966–67 Beryl Smalley, Intellectuals and Politics in the twelfth century
- 1967–68 Robert Blake, The Conservative Party from Peel to Churchill
- 1968–69 Charles Wilson, Queen Elizabeth and the Revolt of the Netherlands
- 1969–70 J. M. Wallace-Hadrill, Early Germanic kingship in England and on the continent
- 1970–71 Michael Howard, The continental commitment: the dilemma of British defence policy in the era of the two world wars
- 1971–72 G. R. Elton, Policy and Police: the enforcement of the Reformation in the age of Thomas Cromwell
- 1972–73 Rodney Hilton, The English peasantry in the later Middle Ages
- 1973–74 John Gallagher, The Decline, Revival and Fall of the British Empire

=== 1975–1999 ===
- 1974–75 Joan Thirsk, Economic Policy, Economic Projects and Political Economy, 1540–1700
- 1975–76 J. P. Kenyon, Revolution principles: the politics of party, 1689–1720
- 1976–77 G. W. S. Barrow, The Anglo-Norman era in Scottish history
- 1977–78 F. S. L. Lyons, Culture and Anarchy in Ireland, 1890–1939
- 1978–79 Patrick Collinson, The religion of Protestants: the church in English society, 1559–1625
- 1979–80 Donald A. Bullough, Alcuin: Achievement and Reputation
- 1980–81 Owen Chadwick, Britain and the Vatican during the Second World War
- 1981–82 J. J. Scarisbrick, Religious Attitudes in Reformation England
- 1982–83 J. O. Prestwich, The Place of War in English History 1066–1214
- 1983–84 Ian R. Christie, Stress and stability in late 18th-century Britain: Reflections on the British avoidance of revolution
- 1984–85 John Habakkuk, Marriage, debt, and the estates system: English landownership 1650–1950
- 1985–86 S. F. C. Milsom, Law and Society in the 12th and 13th centuries
- 1986–87 Keith Robbins, Nineteenth-century Britain: England, Scotland and Wales: the making of a nation
- 1987–88 Conrad Russell, The Causes of the English Civil War
- 1988–89 Barbara Harvey, Living and dying in England 1140–1540, the monastic experience
- 1989–90 Paul Langford, Public Life and Propertied Englishmen, 1689–1798
- 1990–91 Asa Briggs, Culture and Communication in Victorian England
- 1991–92 David Underdown, A Freeborn People: politics and the nation in seventeenth-century England
- 1992–93 P. H. Sawyer, Wealth in Anglo-Saxon England
- 1993–94 F. M. L. Thompson, Gentrification and the Enterprise Culture: Britain 1780–1980
- 1994–95 Paul Slack, From Reformation to improvement: public welfare in early modern England
- 1995–96 James Campbell, Origins of the English state
- 1996–97 Jose Harris, A land of lost content? Visions of civic virtue from Ruskin to Rawls
- 1997–98 R. R. Davies, The first English empire: power and identities in the British Isles, 1093–1343
- 1998–99 T. C. Smout, Use and delight: environmental history in Northern England since 1600
- 1999–2000 Keith Thomas, The ends of life: roads to fulfilment in early modern England

=== 2000–2024 ===
- 2000–01 Christopher Dyer, An Age of Transition? Economy and Society in England in the Later Middle Ages
- 2001–02 Peter Clarke, Britain's image in the world in the twentieth century
- 2002–03 Quentin Skinner, Freedom, Representation, and Revolution, 1603–51
- 2003–04 John Maddicott, The Origins of the English Parliament
- 2004–05 Marianne Elliott, Religion and Ireland
- 2005–06 John Morrill, Living with Revolution
- 2006–07 Robert Bartlett, The Learned Culture of Angevin England
- 2007–08 Ross McKibbin, Parties People and the State: Politics in England c.1914–1951
- 2008–09 John Brewer, The Politics of Feeling in the Age of Revolutions, 1760–1830
- 2009–10 David Bates, The Normans and Empire
- 2010–11 Peter Lake, Bad Queen Bess? Libelous Politics and Secret Histories in an Age of Confessional Conflict
- 2011–12 Roy Foster, Making a Revolution in Ireland, c.1890–1916
- 2012–13 John Blair, Building the Anglo-Saxon Landscape
- 2013–14 Susan Pedersen, Internationalism and Empire: British Dilemmas, 1919–1939
- 2014–15 Steven Gunn, The English people at war in the age of Henry VIII
- 2015–16 Christine Carpenter, The Problem of the Fourteenth Century: Politics, State and Society in England 1307–1399
- 2016–17 Stefan Collini, History in English Criticism, 1919–1961
- 2017–18 Alexandra Walsham, The Reformation of the Generations: Age, Ancestry, and Memory in England, c.1500–1700
- 2018–19 Mark Bailey: After the Black Death: Society, economy and the law in fourteenth-century England
- 2019–20: Margot Finn, Family and Empire: Kinship and British Colonialism in the East India Company Era, c. 1750–1850.
- 2020–21: Jane Ohlmeyer, Ireland, Empire, and the Early Modern World
- 2021–22: Robin Fleming, Dogsbodies and Dogs' Bodies: A Social and Cultural History of Roman Britain's Dogs and People
- 2022–23: Colin Kidd, Peculiarities of the English Enlightenment: Ancients, Moderns and Pagan Pasts
- 2023–24: Alec Ryrie, The World's Reformation

=== From 2025 ===
- 2024–25: Jocelyn Wogan-Browne, French in Medieval Britain: Cultural Politics and Social History, c. 1100–c. 1500
- 2025–26: Peter Mandler, The Language of Social Science in Everyday Life
