= William Moir Calder =

Scottish archaeologist and academic (1881–1960)

Sir William Moir Calder FBA FSAS
- Calder, probably in 1924 or 1925
- Born: 2 July 1881; Edinkillie, Moray, Scotland
- Died: 17 August 1960 (aged 79); Elgin, Moray

Academic background
- Education: University of Aberdeen; Christ Church, Oxford

Academic work
- Institutions: Brasenose College, Oxford; University of Manchester; University of Edinburgh
- Military career
- Allegiance: United Kingdom
- Branch: Admiralty
- Wars: First World War

Sir William Moir Calder FBA FSAS (2 July 1881 – 17 August 1960) was a Scottish archaeologist, epigraphist, classicist, and academic. He was Hulme Professor of Greek at the University of Manchester from 1913 to 1930, and Professor of Greek at the University of Edinburgh from 1930 to 1951.

== Education ==
Calder was born on 2 July 1881 at Edinkillie in Moray. His father, George MacBeth Calder, was a farmer. The younger Calder attended the University of Aberdeen, graduating in 1903 with a first-class Master of Arts (MA) degree in classics; later that year, he secured the Ferguson Scholarship for classics and went up to Christ Church, Oxford. In 1904, he won the Gaisford Prize and the following year was awarded the Craven Scholarship. In 1907, he graduated with a second-class Bachelor of Arts degree in Literae humaniores.

== Career ==
Calder was elected to the Craven Fellowship for 1907–08. For four years from 1908 to 1912, he was then the Hulme Research Student at Brasenose College, Oxford, and travelled to Paris, Berlin, Rome, Greece and Turkey; he extensively explored Lycaonia, Phrygia and Galatia where he collected a range of materials for future study, worked with the archaeologists Sir William Mitchell Ramsay and Gertrude Bell, and developed an interest in the Phrygian language and the early spread of Christianity in those regions.

In 1913, he was appointed Hulme Professor of Greek at the University of Manchester, but he served in the Admiralty during the First World War, and the Greco-Turkish War of 1919 to 1922 then prevented Calder from returning to Asia Minor until the conflict's cessation.

Calder's return to Asia Minor coincided with Ramsay's retirement, and he became a leading archaeologist in the area in collaboration with W. H. Buckler and the American Society for Archaeological Research in Asia Minor. In 1923, he and Buckler co-edited Anatolian Studies Presented to Sir William Mitchell Ramsay (published by Manchester University Press). and during 1924–25, they carried out archaeological excavations in Asia Minor which lead to the publication of Monumenta Asiæ Minoris Antiqua (MAMA). Calder was responsible for the first, fourth, sixth and seventh volumes which appeared between 1928 and 1956. The work's innovative use of photographs alongside every recorded inscription proved influential and, while Buckler was mostly responsible for the organisation and deciphering of these inscriptions, Calder carried out most of the field work and wrote extensive commentaries in various academic journals alongside the MAMA publication. In the meantime, Calder had been appointed Professor of Greek at the University of Edinburgh in 1930 and it was only after his retirement in 1951 that he was able to finish the MAMA and return to Turkey for two further trips.

Calder served as president of the Society of Antiquaries of Scotland in 1950 and of the Classical Association in 1951, and as editor of the Classical Review from 1923 to 1935. He was knighted in 1955, elected a Fellow of the British Academy in 1931, and elected to an honorary fellowship at Brasenose College in 1956. He died on 17 August 1960, in Elgin.

== Likenesses ==
- Sir William Moir Calder, by Elliott & Fry (bromide print, 1955). Kept in the National Portrait Gallery, London (Photographs Collection, NPG x86595).
