= Oxfordshire Record Society =

Flag of Oxfordshire

The Oxfordshire Record Society is a text publication society for the county of Oxfordshire in England. It was established in 1919.

== Selected publications ==
- Vol. 1 : The Chantry certificates and The Edwardian inventories of church goods, edited by Graham Rose (1919)
- Vols. 2, 4, 11 : Parochial collections made by Anthony Wood and Richard Rawlinson, edited by F N Davis (1920-9)
- Vol. 3 : Newington Longeville charters, edited by H E Salter (1921)
- Vol. 5 : Herbert Barnett Glympton : the history of an Oxfordshire manor, edited by Herbert Barnett (1923)
- Vol. 6 : Churchwardens' accounts of Marston, Spelsbury, Pyrton, edited by F W Weaver and G N Clark (1924)
- Vol. 7 : The early history of Mapledurham, edited by A H Cooke (1925)
- Vol. 8 : Adderbury "rectoria" : the manor at Adderbury belonging to New College, Oxford : the building of the chancel, 1408- 1418 : account rolls, deeds and court rolls, edited by T F Hobson (1926)
- Vol. 9 : The manors and advowson of Great Rollright, edited by Reginald W Jeffery (1927)
- Vol. 10 : The churchwardens' presentments in the Oxfordshire peculiars of Dorchester, Thame, and Banbury, edited by Sidney A Peyton (1928)
- Vol. 12 : The feet of fines for Oxfordshire 1195-1291, edited by H E Salter (1930)
- Vols. 13 and 14 : A collection of charters relating to Goring, Streatley and the neighborhood, 1181-1546, preserved in the Bodleian Library, edited by T R Gambier-Parry (1931-2)
- Vol. 15 : Saxon Oxfordshire : charters and ancient highways, edited by G B Grundy (1933)
- Vol. 16 : Oxfordshire justices of the peace in the seventeenth century, edited by Mary Sturge Gretton (1934)
- Vol. 17 : The history of Dean and Chalford, edited by M D Lobel (1935)
- Vol. 18 : Eynsham under the monks, edited by Edmund Chambers (1936)
- Vols. 19 and 22 : The Sandford cartulary, edited by Agnes M Leys (1938–41)
- Vol. 20 : Tusmore papers, edited by L G Wickham Legg (1939)
- Vol. 21 : Hearth tax returns : Oxfordshire 1665, edited by Maureen M B Weinstock (1940)
- Vols. 23 and 24 : The Archdeacon's court : Liber actorum 1584, edited by E R Brinkworth (1942-6)
- Vols. 25 and 26 : The Thame cartulary, edited by H E Salter (1947-8)
- Vol. 27 : The progress notes of Warden Woodward round the Oxfordshire estates of New College, Oxford, 1659-1675, edited by R L Rickard (1949)
- Vols. 28, 30, 32 and 34 : The church bells of Oxfordshire, edited by Frederick Sharpe (1949–53)
- Vols. 29, 31 and 33 : Journal of Sir Samuel Luke, edited by I G Phillip (1950-3)
- Vol. 35 : Bishop Wilberforce's visitation returns for the Archdeaconry of Oxford in the year 1854, edited by E P Baker (1954)
- Vol. 36 : Oxfordshire protestation returns 1641-2, edited by Christopher S A Dobson (1955)
- Vol. 37 : Wheatley records 956-1956, edited by W O Hassall (1956)
- Vol. 38: Articles of enquiry addressed to the clergy of the diocese of Oxford at the primary visitation of Dr Thomas Secker 1738, edited by H A Lloyd Jukes (1957)
- Vol. 39 : Some Oxfordshire wills proved in the Prerogative Court of Canterbury 1393-1510, edited by J R H Weaver and A Beardwood (1958)
- Vol. 40 : Index to wills proved in the Peculiar Court of Banbury, 1542- 1858, and Custumal (1391) and Bye-laws (1386-1540) of the Manor of Islip, edited by J S W Gibson and Barbara F Harvey (1959)
- Vol. 41 : Henley Borough records : Assembly books i-iv, 1395-1543, edited by P M Briers (1960)
- Vol. 42 : The papers of Captain Henry Stevens, waggon-mastergeneral to King Charles I, edited by Margaret Toynbee (1961)
- Vols. 43 and 49 : The Royalist ordnance papers 1642-1646, edited by Ian Roy (1964–75)
- Vol. 44 : Household and farm inventories in Oxfordshire 1550-1590, edited by M A Havinden (1965)
- Vol. 45 : Index of persons in Oxfordshire deeds acquired by the Bodleian Library 1878-1963, edited by W O Hassall (1966)
- Vol. 46 : Oxfordshire hundred rolls of Bampton and Witney Borough 1279, edited by T Stone and P Hyde (1969)
- Vol. 47 : The letter-books of Samuel Wilberforce 1843-68, edited by R K Pugh (1970)
- Vol. 48 : Agricultural trade unionism in Oxfordshire 1872-81, edited by Pamela Horn (1974)
- Vol. 50 : Manorial records of Cuxham, Oxfordshire, circa 1200-1359, edited by P D A Harvey (1976)
- Vol. 51 : Village education in nineteenth-century Oxfordshire, incorporating the Whitchurch school log book 1868-93, edited by Pamela Horn (1978)
- Vol. 52 : Bishop Fell and nonconformity - visitation documents from the Oxford diocese 1682-83, edited by Mary Clapinson (1980)
- Vol. 53 : Oxfordshire sessions of the peace in the reign of Richard II, edited by Elisabeth G Kimball (1983)
- Vol. 54: Calendar of the court books of the borough of Witney 1538-1610, edited by James L Bolton and Marjorie M Maslen (1985)
- Vol. 55 : Church and chapel in Oxfordshire 1851 - the return of the census of religious worship, edited by Kate Tiller (1987)
- Vol. 56 : The Oxfordshire Eyre 1241, edited by Janet Cooper (1989)
- Vol. 57 : The correspondence of Thomas Secker, Bishop of Oxford 1737-58, edited by A P Jenkins (1991)
- Vol. 58 : Woodstock chamberlains' accounts 1609-50, edited by Marjorie Maslen (1993)
- Vol. 59 : Oxfordshire and North Berkshire Protestation Returns and tax assessments 1641-42, edited by Jeremy Gibson (1994)
- Vol. 60 : The Oxfordshire Muster Rolls, 1539, 1542 and 1569, edited by Peter C Beauchamp (1996)
- Vol. 61 : Index to the probate records of the Courts of the Bishop and Archdeacon of Oxford, 1733-1857, and of the Oxfordshire Peculiars, 1547-1856, edited by D M Barratt, Joan Howard-Drake and Mark Priddey (1997)
- Vol. 62 : The Brightwell parish diaries, edited by Mark Spurrell (1998)
- Vol. 63 : Calendar of the Court Books of the Borough of New Woodstock 1588-1595, edited by Royston F Taylor (2002)
- Vol. 64 : Oxfordshire Forests 1246-1609, edited by Beryl Schumer (2002)
- Vol. 65 : Calendar of the Court Books of the Borough of New Woodstock 1607-1622, edited by Royston F Taylor, Mary Hodges et al. (2007)
- Vol. 66 : The diocese Books of Samuel Wilberforce, Bishop of Oxford 1845-1869, edited by Ronald and Margaret Pugh (2008)
- Vol. 67 : An Historical Atlas of Oxfordshire, edited by Kate Tiller and Giles Darkes (2010)
- Vol. 68 : Oxfordshire Friendly Societies 1750-1918, edite by Shaun Morley (2011)
- Vol. 69 : The Life and Times of a Charlbury Quaker - the Journals of William Jones 1784-1818, edited by Hannah Jones (2014)
- Vol. 70 : Wood's Radley College Diary 1855-1861, edited by Mark Spurrell (2016)
- Vol. 71 : Records of Holton Park Girls' Grammar School 1948-1972, edited by Marilyn Yurdan (2017)

== See also ==
- Oxfordshire Record Society website
- Oxford Historical Society
