= G. J. Turner =

English barrister and legal historian

George James Turner, FBA, FSA (1867–1946) was an English barrister and legal historian.

== Early life and education ==
Born in Kensington on 2 November 1867, Turner was the son of Catherine, daughter of the Rev. W. Kempson, and Anselm Turner (died 1879), a clerk in the House of Commons; he attended Tonbridge School and The King's School, Canterbury, before going up to St John's College, Cambridge, in 1886. He graduated three years later and was called to the bar at Lincoln's Inn in 1893.

== Legal historian ==
Turner came to be regarded as an "authority on medieval law". He helped the legal historian F. W. Maitland edit the Year Books of Edward II, the first two volumes of which were published by the Selden Society in Maitland's lifetime (in 1903 and 1904) and the third the year after his death. Turner brought the fourth volume to print in 1914 and further volumes in 1926, 1929 and 1946.

In 1900 Turner was elected a Fellow of the Society of Antiquaries of London. He was the special lecturer for the Society for the Public Teachers of Law in 1928 and gave the Ford Lecture at the University of Oxford in 1937, the same year that he became joint literary editor of the Selden Society's publications. He was elected a Fellow of the British Academy, the United Kingdom's national academy for the humanities, in 1932 and sat on its council from 1937.

In his old age, Turner became blind. He died on 14 June 1946, leaving his porcelain and silver collection to Pembroke College, Cambridge.

== Likenesses ==
- George James Turner, by Walter Stoneman (bromide print, 1932). Preserved in the National Portrait Gallery, London (Photographic Collection, NPG x27690).
