= Andrew George Little =

British historian (1863–1945)

Portrait by Walter Stoneman, 1923

Andrew George Little FBA (28 September 1863 – 22 October 1945) was an English historian, specialising in the Franciscans (known as the Greyfriars) in medieval England. He was Professor of History at the University College of South Wales, Cardiff, between 1898 and 1901 (having previously been the college's first history lecturer there since 1892). He was thereafter a visiting lecturer (1903–20) and then reader (1920–32) in palaeography at the University of Manchester. He was president of the Historical Association from 1926 to 1929, and was elected a Fellow of the British Academy in 1922.

== Select publications ==
For a full bibliography down to 1938, see An address presented to Andrew George Little, with a bibliography of his writings (1938). His books included:

- The Grey Friars in Oxford (Oxford: Clarendon Press for the Oxford Historical Society, 1892).
- Mediaeval Wales, Chiefly in the Twelfth and Thirteenth Centuries (London: T. Fisher Unwin, 1902).
- Initia Operum Latinorum quae Saeculis XIII., XIV., XV. Attribuuntur (Manchester: Manchester University Press, 1904).
- Edition of Thomas of Eccleston, Tractatus de adventu Fratrum Minorum in Angliam (Manchester: Manchester University Press, 1909).
- Studies in English Franciscan History (Manchester: Manchester University Press, 1917) – based on the Ford Lectures he gave at the University of Oxford in 1916
- (Edited based on material by Paul Sabatier) Speculum Perfectionis, 2 vols. (Manchester: British Society for Franciscan Studies, 1928–31).
- (Co-authored with Father Franz Pelster) Oxford Theology and Theologians, c. a.d. 1282–1302 (Oxford: Clarendon Press for the Oxford Historical Society, 1934)
