= Oxford Historical Society =

Text publication society in Oxford, England

- Founded: 1884
- Country of origin: United Kingdom
- Headquarters location: Oxford
- Distribution: Boydell & Brewer
- Publication types: Books
- Nonfiction topics: History
- Official website: www.oxhistsoc.org.uk

The Oxford Historical Society (OHS) is a text publication society concerned with the history of the city of Oxford and the surrounding area in the historic county of Oxfordshire in southern England.

== History ==
The Oxford Historical Society was founded in 1884 by a group of Oxford University dons in memory of the Revd John Richard Green.

The society formally became a charity in 2003.

== Aims ==
The OHS exists to publish archives, historical texts, bibliographical tools and studies about the city and University of Oxford, and the neighbouring villages and towns in Oxfordshire (as it was before 1972). The society seeks out materials from a wide variety of sources for its research. It has published around 140 volumes on the history of Oxford and Oxfordshire, especially concentrating on early records.

The Society is administered by a committee of trustees from the university and city of Oxford. Its current president is William Whyte, Fellow and Tutor in History at St John's College, Oxford.

== See also ==
- Oxfordshire Architectural and Historical Society
- Oxfordshire Record Society
