= Finnish Antiquarian Society =

Scholarly society

- Founded: 1870
- Purpose: Archaeology, ethnology, art history and cultural history
- Location: Helsinki, Finland
- Region served: Finland
- Members: 356 (2022)
- Website: www.muinaismuistoyhdistys.fi

The Finnish Antiquarian Society (Finnish: Suomen Muinaismuistoyhdistys) is a scholarly society for the purpose of promoting archaeological, ethnological, art-historical and cultural-historical research concerning Finland and other Finno-Ugrian regions and peoples.

The society publishes four peer-reviewed book series; Suomen Muinaismuistoyhdistyksen Aikakauskirja, Suomen Museo-Finskt Museum, Kansatieteellinen Arkisto and Iskos.

== List of chairmen ==
- Zachris Topelius 1870–1875, 1878–1879
- Wilhelm Lagus 1875–1878
- K. E. F. Ignatius 1879–1885
- J. R. Aspelin 1885–1915
- Hjalmar Appelgren-Kivalo 1915, 1918–1919
- Theodor Schwindt 1916–1917
- Axel Olai Heikel 1917–1918
- Alfred Hackman 1919–1920
- Juhani Rinne 1920–1921
- Kustavi Grotenfelt 1921–1922
- U. T. Sirelius 1922–1923, 1924–1929
- Julius Ailio 1923–1924
- Björn Cederhvarf 1929–1930
- A. M. Tallgren 1930–1942
- Aarne Äyräpää 1942–1945
- Kustaa Vilkuna 1945–1962
- Ella Kivikoski 1962–1968
- Lars Pettersson 1968–1973
- Carl Fredrik Meinander 1973–1976
- Henrik Lilius 1977–1984
- Juhani U. E. Lehtonen 1984–1991
- Torsten Edgren 1991–1998
- Teppo Korhonen 1998–2004
- Helena Edgren 2004–2010
- Mika Lavento 2010–2016
- Pia Olsson 2016–2021
- Elina Räisänen 2021–
