= Mika Lavento =

Finnish archaeologist

- Born: Mika Tapio Lavento; March 29, 1962 (age 64); Kajaani, Finland
- Education: University of Helsinki
- Occupation: Professor of Archaeology
- Employer: University of Helsinki
- Predecessor: Ari Siiriäinen
- Scientific career
- Fields: Archaeologist
- Thesis: Textile ceramics in Finland and on the Karelian Isthmus (2001)

Mika Tapio Lavento (born 29 March 1962) is a Finnish archaeologist. He has worked as the Professor of Archaeology at the University of Helsinki since 2004.

== Early life ==
Lavento was born in Kajaani on 29 March 1962, to father, dentist Ari Lavento and mother, Auli Lavento.

He got interested in archaeology in the early 1980s, after having taken part in a tour of the local archaeological sites, arranged by the Kainuu Museum.

== Career ==
Lavento studied in the University of Helsinki. During his studies, he worked at the National Board of Antiquities, where he did archaeological field works, and was later hired to work on the first iteration of the National Archaeological Site Registry.

In 2001, Lavento graduated as a doctor of philosophy from University of Helsinki on September 11, 2001. He wrote his doctoral dissertation about prehistorical textile ceramics in Finland and on the Karelian Isthmus. In the dissertation, he expands on the ideas of Carl Fredrik Meinander and collected comparative archaeological material from Russia

In 2004, he was chosen as the professor of archaeology at University of Helsinki, after his predecessor Ari Siiriäinen had retired in 2002. Lavento is a member of the Indigeneity Research Unit of Hokkaido University, Japan. He was also the chairman of the Archaeological Society of Finland in 1999-2002 and the chairman of the Finnish Antiquarian Society from 2010 to 2016

== Awards and honours ==
In 2011, Lavento was invited as a full member of the Finnish Society of Sciences and Letters.

In 2022, a Festschrift honouring Lavento was published by the Archaeological Society of Finland for his 60th birthday.

== Publications ==
=== Books ===
- Johdatus arkeologiaan (with Petri Halinen and Visa Immonen) (2009)
- Muinaisuutemme jäljet: Suomen esi- ja varhaishistoria kivikaudelta keskiajalle (with Georg Haggrén, Petri Halinen, Sami Raninen and Anna Wessman) (2015)

=== Selected academic works ===
- Maaperän fosforianalyysi arkeologiassa (with Timo Jussila and Hans-Peter Schulz) (1989)
- Textile ceramics in Finland and on the Karelian Isthmus: Nine variations and fugue on a theme of C. F. Meinander (2001)
- Karelian Isthmus – Stone Age Studies in 1998–2003 (as editor) (2008)
- Petra ‒ The Mountain of Aaron III: The Archaeological Survey (with Paula Kouki) (2013)
- Хозяйство волжских финнов эпохи поздней бронзы и начала железного века (with Valerij Patrušev) (2019)
