= Ari Siiriäinen =

Finnish archaeologist (1939–2004)

- Born: Ari Pekka Siiriäinen; 16 November 1939; Viipuri, Finland
- Died: 9 December 2004 (aged 65); Helsinki, Finland
- Education: University of Helsinki
- Known for: Excavations in Nubia
- Predecessor: Carl Fredrik Meinander
- Successor: Mika Lavento
- Scientific career
- Fields: Archaeologist
- Workplaces: University of Helsinki
- Thesis: Studies Relating to Shore Displacements and Stone Age Chronology in Finland (1974)

Ari Pekka Siiriäinen (16 November 1939 – 9 December 2004) was a Finnish archaeologist. He worked as the Professor of Archaeology in University of Helsinki from 1983 to 2004.

== Early life ==
Siiriäinen was born on 16th of November 1939 in Viipuri, Finland but was evacuated in a splint basket to Helsinki when he was just few weeks old, after Winter War had started.

He grew up in Helsinki and graduated from Normal Lyceum of Helsinki in 1958. After serving in the army as a conscript, he started studying geology in the University of Helsinki, but soon changed his major to archaeology.

== Career ==
Shortly after becoming a student of archaeology, Siiriäinen was hired for a summer job to excavate in Lapland in 1960.

He was selected as the professor of archaeology in the University of Helsinki in 1983, after his predecessor Carl Fredrik Meinander had retired.

Siiriäinen worked as a visiting researcher in University of California, Berkeley in 1978-1979 and as a visiting professor in State University of New York in 1994.

Siiriäinen was a founding member of The Archaeological Society of Finland and acted as its chairman in 2002.

== Illness and death ==
Shortly after retiring, Siiriäinen was diagnosed with cancer and heart disease in 2003, after returning from his last expedition to South America. Siiriäinen died of cancer on 9th of December 2004. Before his passing, he stated that "I'll die as a happy man".

== Award and honours ==
A peer-reviewed festschrift, published by the Finnish Antiquarian Society, was dedicated to Siiriäinen in 1999.

== Publications ==
=== Books ===
- Lohjalaisten historia (with Heikki Ylikangas) (1973)
- Suur-Tuusulan historia: Tuusula - Kerava - Järvenpää. 1. Esihistoriallisesta ajasta seurakunnan perustamiseen 1643 (with Jaakko Sarkamo and Åke Winqvist) (1983)
- Mankkaan seudun historiikki (1993)
- Afrikan kulttuurien juuret (with Arvi Hurskainen) (1995)

=== Selected academic works ===
- The Wadi Halfa region (Northern Sudan) in the Stone Age, based on the researches of the Scandinavian joint expedition to Nubia 1962-1963 (1966)
- Studies Relating to Shore Displacements and Stone Age Chronology in Finland (1974)
- Iron Age Cultivation in SW Finland (with Kimmo Tolonen and Anna-Liisa Hirviluoto) (1976)
- Excavations in Laikipia: An Archeological Study of the Recent Prehistory in the Eastern Highlands of Kenya (1984)
- Archaeological evidence for dating the sediments in a playa in Farafra, Western Desert of Egypt (1999)
- Reports of the Finnish-Bolivian Archaeological Project in the Bolivian Amazon II - Noticias del proyecto arqueológico finlandés-boliviano en la Amazonia boliviana II (as editor) (2002)
