= Julius Ailio =

Finnish archaeologist and politician (1872–1933)

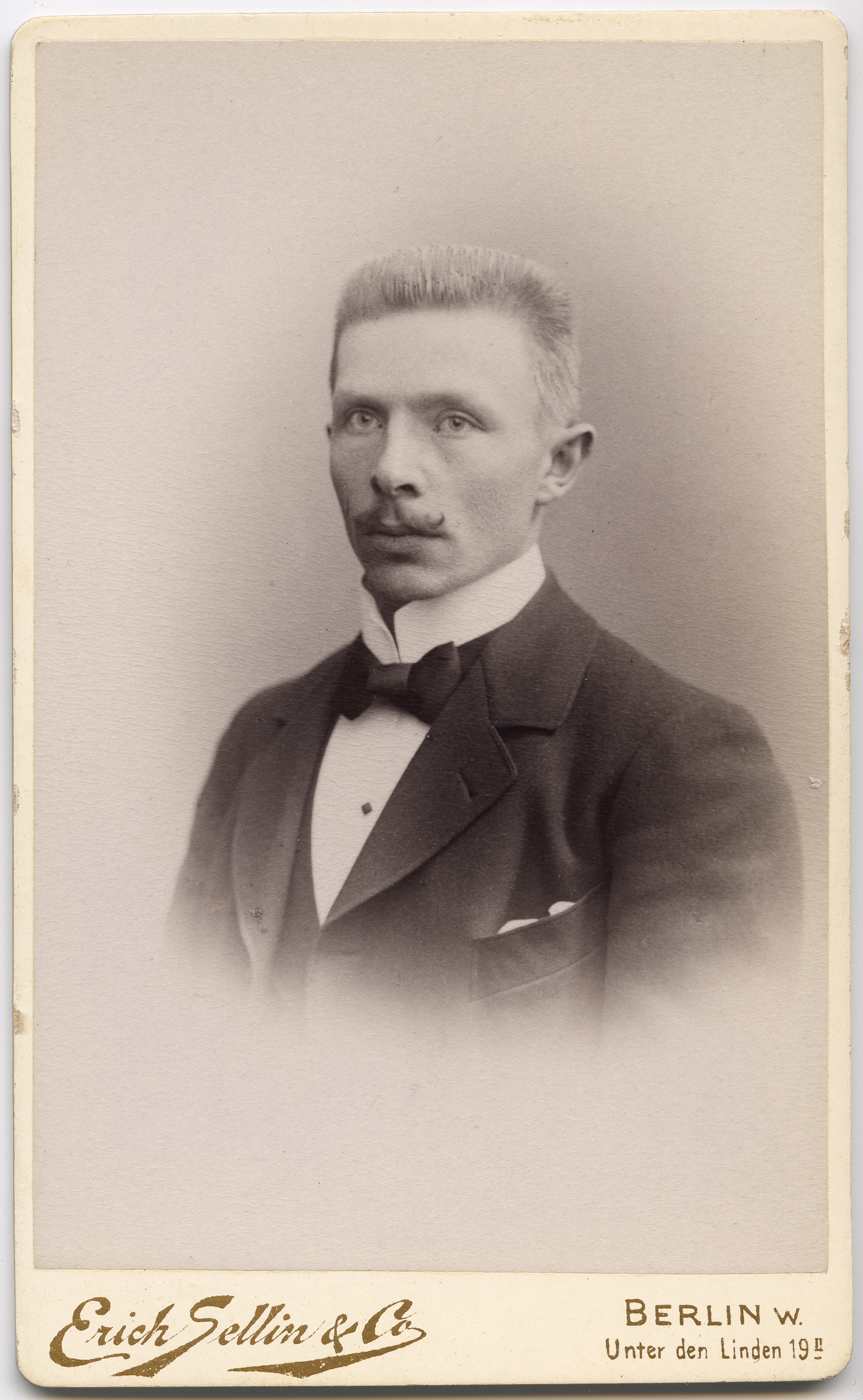
Julius Ailio

Julius Ailio (19 July 1872 – 4 March 1933) was a Finnish archaeologist and a Social Democratic politician. His archaeological work involved the Stone Age and Early Metal Age (Note: Overlapping with the Nordic Bronze Age, when referring to Fennoscandia this age spans from roughly 1700 BCE to 500 BCE or 1850 BCE to 50 BCE.) in Karelia, especially the isthmus.

== Biography ==
On 19 July 1872, Ailio was born in Loppi, Grand Duchy of Finland, Russian Empire to a school teacher and future Social Democratic member of Finnish parliament.

In 1906, he excavated Räisälä Papinkangas. Between 1909 and 1912, he excavated dwelling sites Riukjärvi and Piiskunsalmi. He also researched shore displacement at Lake Ladoga, creating the first model of its history, a history late 19th-century geologists and archaeologists had already found unique for its deviation from the standard land uplift model. In 1909 and 1910, he with Kaarle Soikkeli salvage excavated Häyrynmäki in Viipuri Province. From his 1909 excavations he first identified the Kiukainen culture and Corded Ware as distinct archaeological cultures, referring to the latter as Alastaro pottery. In 1915, he excavated Heinjoki Vetokallio.

In 1917, during Oskari Tokoi's chairmanship of the Senate of Finland, he served in the body with Väinö Tanner, Väinö Voionmaa, Wäinö Wuolijoki, Matti Paasivuori, and six bourgeoise representatives.

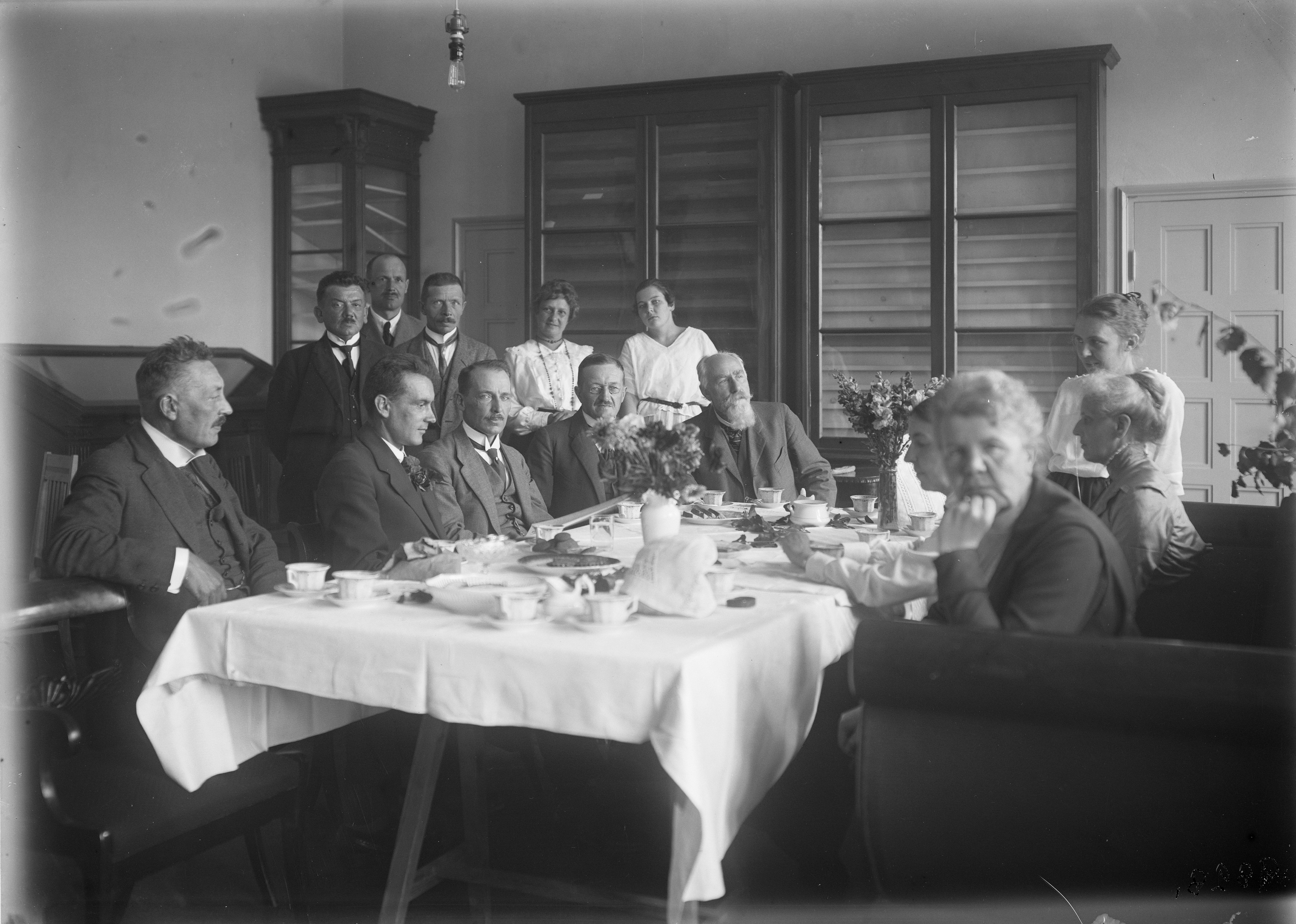
Ailio (third standing on the left) at Aarne Michaël Tallgren's house on 3 September 1920

In 1921, he expressed study facial features, skin color, and hair structure as less important than the skeleton and inner organs in anthropology. In Fragen der russischen Steinzeit (1922) Ailio responded to Aarne Michaël Tallgren's conceptualization of Russian Bronze Age cultures, being the third Finnish scholar to do so. Timo Salminen characterized it as bitter and an exercise to prove his knowledge for the archaeology professorship at Helsinki University. Ailio did not believe the Comb Ceramic culture and Fat'janavo related. He considered the latter's pottery connected to Central Europe, the Kuban, and the Tripolye culture, but did not know the main origin. He rejected Allgren's assumption of it being primarily Central European and regarded the culture to be a "broader chronological phenomenon". In the article he also considered a Pärnu figurine as a Muttergott (Mother-God) based on similar findings with the Tripolye. In 1923, Ailio rejected the notion Giant's Churches were former Stone Age man-made structures and instead labeled them as shore formations.

Head of prehistory of the National Board of Antiquities, in late 1922, he was appointed chairman of a committee responsible for the cooperation of local museums, with the proposer, Julius Finnberg, as secretary; the project received support from the state archeologist Hjalmar Appelgren-Kivalo. Its first academic conference convened in January 1923 at the National Museum and was attended by 52 representatives. Also involved in the establishment of the Finnish Museums Association, when Ailio became Minister of Education in 1927, the association was subsidized.

In 1930, he signed a manifesto denouncing militarization and conscription.

In 1932, excavated Muolaa Kuusaa Kannilanjoki.

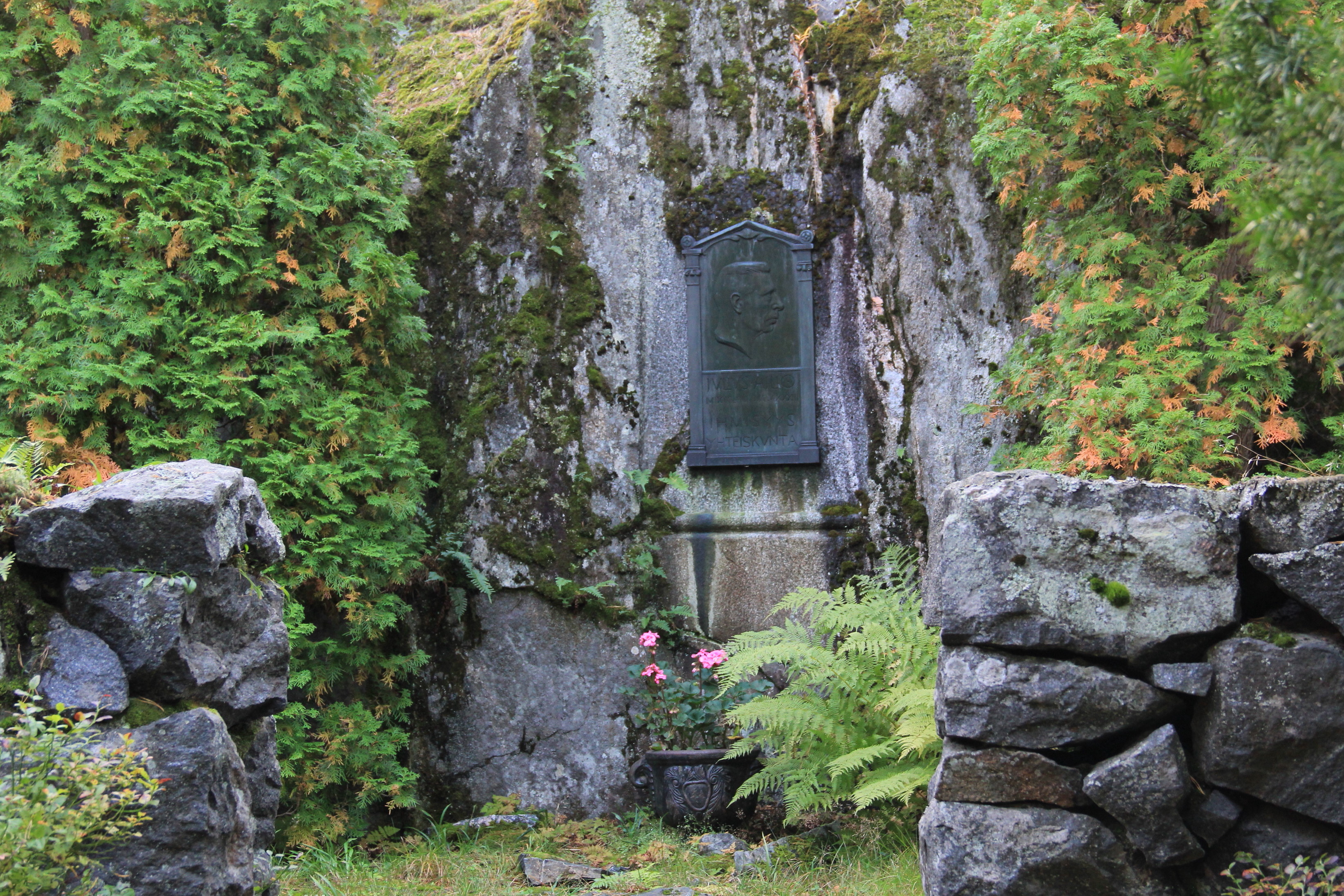
Ailio's grave in Kauniainen

On 4 March 1933, he died in Helsinki.

== Works ==
- Kansatieteellinen kuvaus ulkohuonerakennuksista Lopella (1896)
- Kesäkausi Jäämeren ja Vienanmeren rannoilla matkamuistelma (1899)
- Burg Tavastehus, ihre Entwickelung und ihr Alter (1901)
- Hämeenlinna sen vaiheet ja sen rakennukset (1901)
- Lopen asunnot eri kehitysasteissaan (1902)
- Jääkausi ja sen jälkeiset ajat erityisesti Suomen oloja silmällä pitäen (1903)
- Raseporin linnanrauniot kuvallinen matkaopas (1905)
- Die steinzeitlichen Wohnplatsfunde in Finland I- II. Helsinki: Finnische Altertumsgesellschaft. (1909)
- Elämästä Suomessa noin 4000 vuotta sitte, kirj. Kansanvalistusseuran kalenteri 1911: kolmaskymmenesensimmäinen vuosikerta. (1911)
- Die geographische Entwicklung des Ladogasees im postglacialer Zeit und ihre Beziehung zur steinzeitlichen Besiedlung. Fennia 38-3. Helsinki. (1915)
- Novgorodilaisten retki Hämeeseen v. 1311 (1915)
- Hämeenlinnan kaupungin historia. 1 (1917)
- Fragen der russischen Steinzeit. Suomen Muinaismuistoyhdistyksen Aikakauskirja Vol. XXIX No. 1. Helsinki. (1922)
- Karjalaiset soikeat kupurasoljet – katkelmia Karjalan koristetyylin kehityshistoriasta (1922)
- Hämeen museon opas (1922; multiple editions)
- Ovatko Pohjanmaan "jättiläislinnat" muinaisjäännöksiä?, Suomen Museo XXIX, 1–19 (1923)

== See also ==
- Archaeology of Northern Europe
- Political history of Finland#The time of independence (1917–present)
- Sakari Pälsi
- Theodor Schwindt

== Sources ==
Notes

Citations

Bibliography

- Carpelan, Christian; Halinen, Petri; Kirkinen, Tuija; Lavento, Mika (2008). "An archaeological reconnaissance trip to the Karelian Isthmus: excursion diary 28 September - 2 October 1998". Karelian Isthmus: Stone Age studies in 1998 - 2003. Helsinki: The Finnish Antiquarian Society. pp. 9–27. ISBN 978-951-9057-68-2.
- Vilkuna, Janne (1 January 1970). "The Finnish Museums Association - 75 years working for museums". Nordisk Museologi (1): 17–32. doi:10.5617/nm.3594. ISSN 2002-0503.
