= Henrik Meinander =

Finnish historian

Carl Henrik Meinander
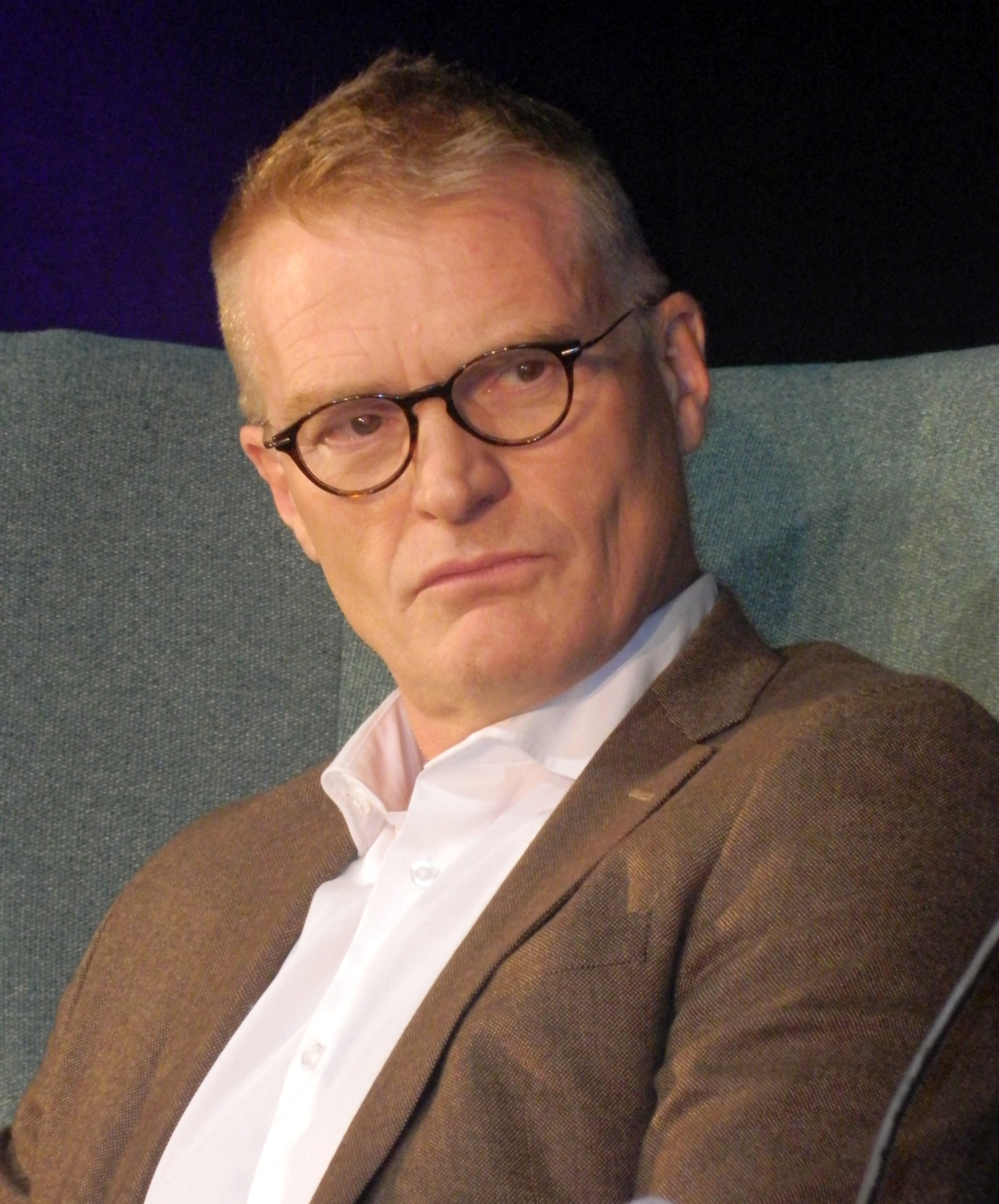
- Henrik Meinander at Helsinki Book Fair in 2016
- Born: Carl Henrik Meinander; 19 May 1960 (age 65); Helsinki, Finland
- Father: Carl Fredrik Meinander
- Scientific career
- Fields: History
- Institutions: University of Helsinki
- Website: henrikmeinander.com

Carl Henrik Meinander (born 19 May 1960 in Helsinki), is a Finnish historian, PhD 1994. From 2002 Meinander is the keeper of the Swedish-speaking professorship in history (after Matti Klinge) at Helsinki University. He is the son of the famous archaeologist Carl Fredrik Meinander.

Meinander has focused on the history of gymnastics in his doctoral dissertation Towards a bourgeois manhood (1994) and Lik martallen, som rågfältet (1996). In Finlands historia, part 4 (1999) he appears as an unbiased interpreter of the Finnish republics history. He has also engaged himself in the public debate as columnist in the newspaper Hufvudstadsbladet.

He has been a foreign member of the Royal Swedish Academy of Sciences since 2002.
