= Aarne Michaël Tallgren =

Finnish archaeologist

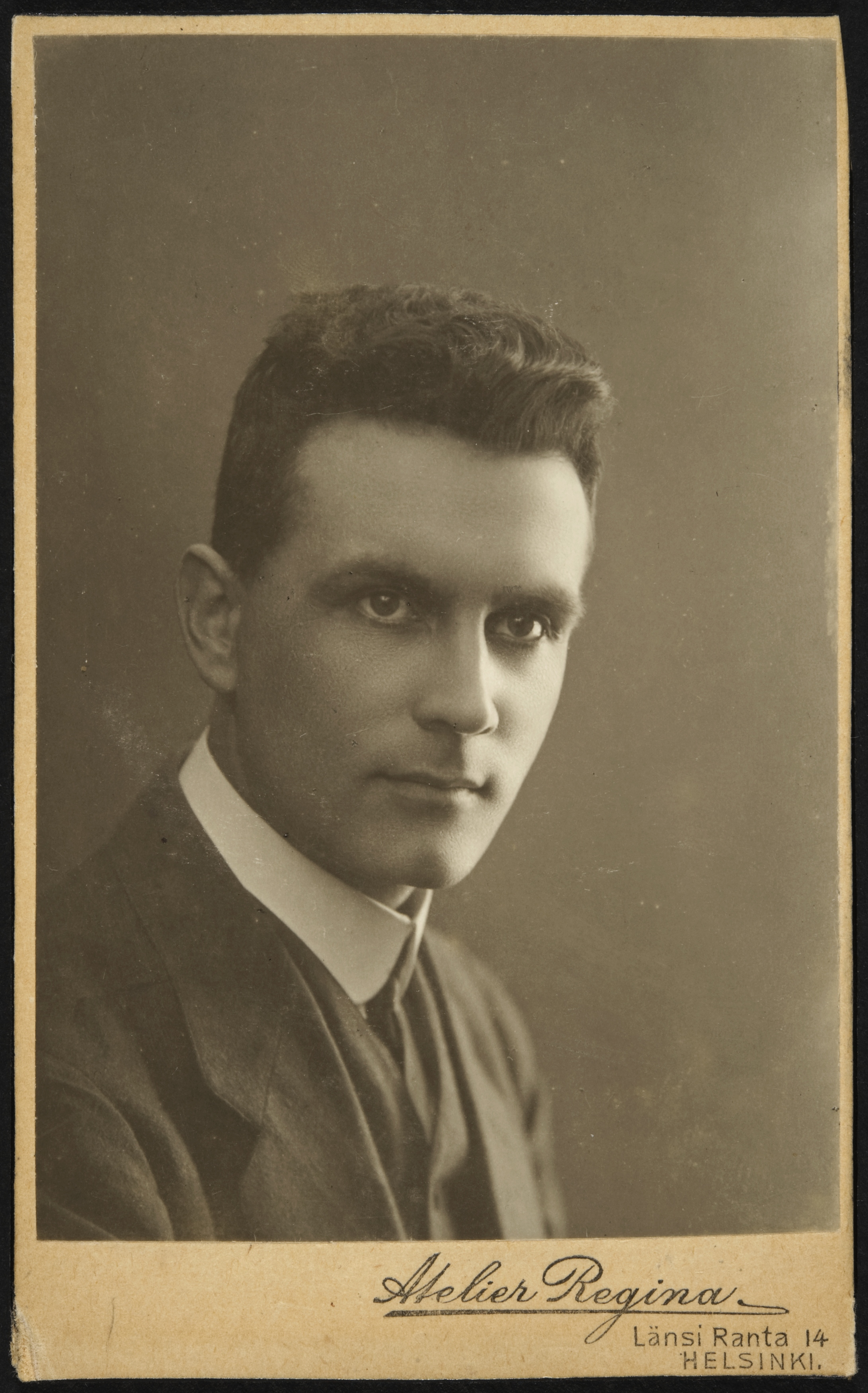
- Aarne Michaël Tallgren in 1914
- Born: Aarne Michaël Tallgren; 8 February 1885; Ruovesi, Finland
- Died: 13 April 1945 (aged 60); Helsinki, Finland
- Education: University of Tartu
- Occupation: Professor of Archaeology
- Employer(s): University of Tartu, University of Helsinki
- Successor: Aarne Äyräpää
- Scientific career
- Fields: Archaeologist

Aarne Michaël Tallgren (8 February 1885 – 13 April 1945) was a Finnish archaeologist.

Tallgren was born in Ruovesi. He earned his PhD in 1914 and served as professor of archaeology at the University of Tartu. In 1923, he became the first professor of Finnish and Nordic archaeology at the University of Helsinki. He held the chair until his death in 1945.

Tallgren's research focused mainly on the Bronze Age and the Early Iron Age in Eastern Europe. He founded the journal Eurasia septentrionalis antiqua which was published in 12 volumes from 1926 to 1938 and became the leading international publication in this field. His work in Estonia resulted in Zur Archäologie Eestis (two volumes, 1922 and 1925) which was the first modern scientific publication on the country's prehistory. He undertook many trips to the Soviet Union until 1936, when he cut off all contact with the country for ideological reasons and was subsequently declared persona non grata.

He was a foreign member of the Royal Swedish Academy of Letters, History and Antiquities and an honorary member of the Swedish Antiquarian Society, and served as chairman of the Finnish Antiquarian Society for many years. In 1940, the Society of Antiquaries of London awarded him the gold medal for distinguished services to archaeology. In the same year, he was elected corresponding fellow of the British Academy. His brother was the linguist Oiva Tuulio and his sister was the writer Anna-Maria Tallgren.
