= Ella Kivikoski =

Finnish archaeologist (1901–1990)

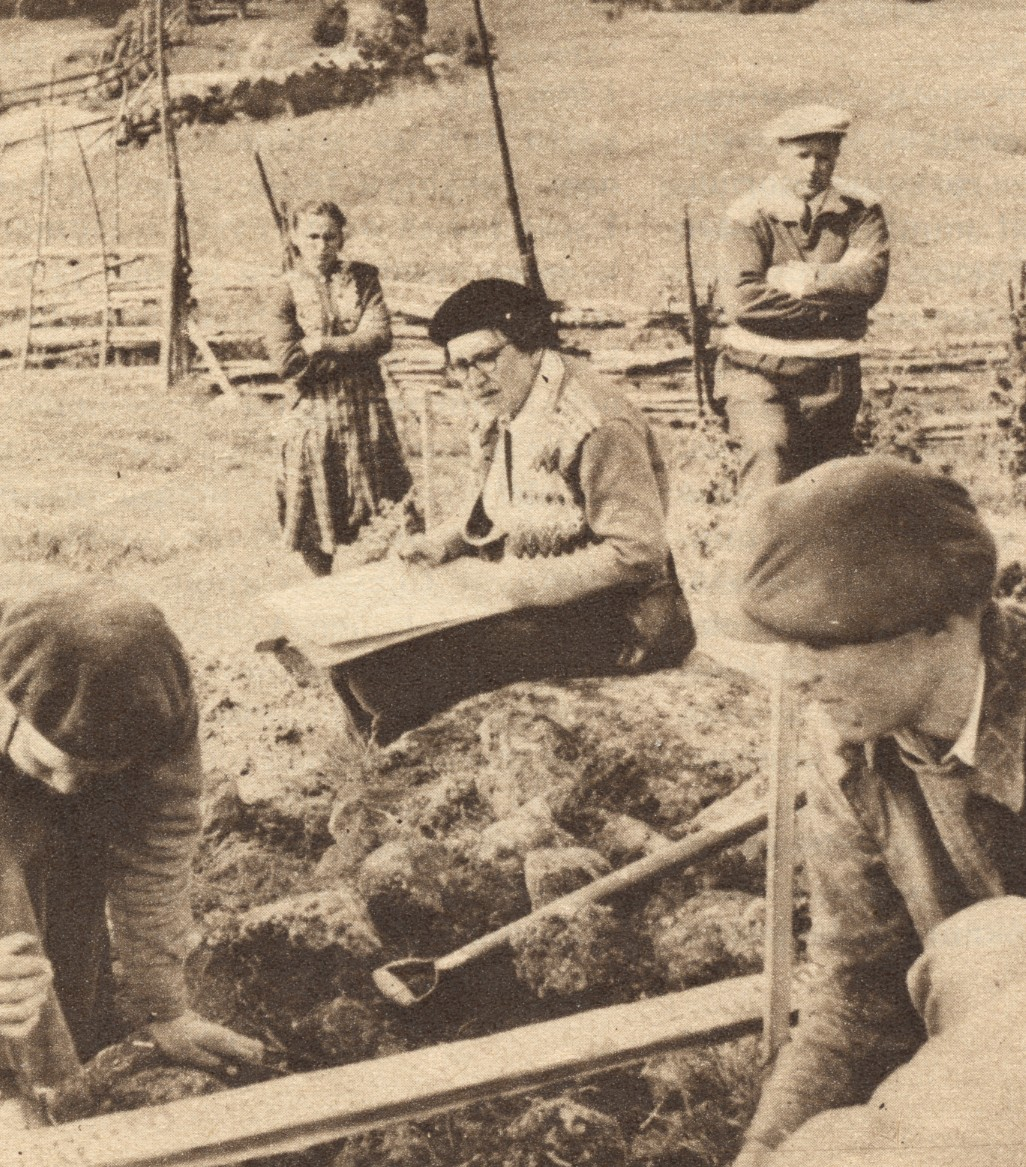
- Archaeologist Ella kivikoski on a dig 1953
- Born: Ella Margareta Kivikoski; 25 May 1901; Tammela, Finland
- Died: 27 July 1990 (aged 89); Helsinki, Finland
- Education: University of Helsinki
- Occupation: Professor of Archaeology
- Known for: Studies on the Iron Age of Finland, First female PhD in Archaeology of Finland
- Predecessor: Aarne Äyräpää
- Successor: Carl Fredrik Meinander
- Scientific career
- Fields: Archaeologist
- Workplaces: University of Helsinki
- Thesis: Die Eisenzeit in Auraflussgebiet (1939)

Ella Margareta Kivikoski (25 May 1901 in Tammela – 27 July 1990) was the first Finnish female to earn a doctorate in archaeology in Finland. In 1931, she studied at the Baltic Institute in Stockholm and developed a scholarly working relationship with the Estonian archaeologist Harri Moora. She was a Professor of Archaeology at the University of Helsinki from 1948 until 1969, specializing in both Finnish and Nordic archaeology. Her specialty was the Finnish Iron Age.

== Selected works ==
- Die Eisenzeit in Auraflussgebiet. (Thesis/dissertation, 1939.) (Translations in Finnish, English and German.)
- Suomen historiallinen bibliografia 1901-1925: Finsk historisk bibliografi: Bibliographie historique finlandaise: I-II. (1 vol.) (with Aarno Maliniemi) Helsinki: Suomen historiallinen seura, (1940) (in Finnish)
- Strena archaeologica (with Aarne Michaël Tallgren) Helsinki: Puromies, (1945) (in Finnish)
- Suomen rautakauden kuvasto, Vol 1 Porvoo: W. Söderström, (1947) (in Finnish)
- Suomen rautakauden kuvasto, Vol 2 Porvoo: W. Söderström, (1951) (in Finnish)
- Carolla Archaeologica in Honorem C.A. Nordmann (with C A Nordmann) Helsinki: Puromiehen Kirjapaino, (1952) (in Finnish)
- Suomen historia 1: Suomen esihistoria (with Jalmari Jaakkola) Helsinki: W. Söderström, (1958) (in Finnish)
- Suomen historia. Osa 1, Suomen esihistoria (with Jalmari Jaakkola) Porvoo: WSOY, (1961) (in Finnish)
- Suomen arkeologinen bibliografia 1951-1960 = Die archäologische Bibliographie Finnlands 1951-1960 Helsinki: [s.n.], (1962) (in Finnish)
- Finlands förhistoria (Suomen esihistoria, schwed.) Helsinki: O. Weilin & Göös, (1964) (Translations in Finnish, English, German and Swedish)
- Suomen kiinteät muinaisjäänökset Helsinki: Suomalaisen Kirjallisuuden Seura, (1966) Finnish
- Finland. Ancient Peoples and Places vol. 53 London: Thames and Hudson (1967)
