= Kustavi Grotenfelt =

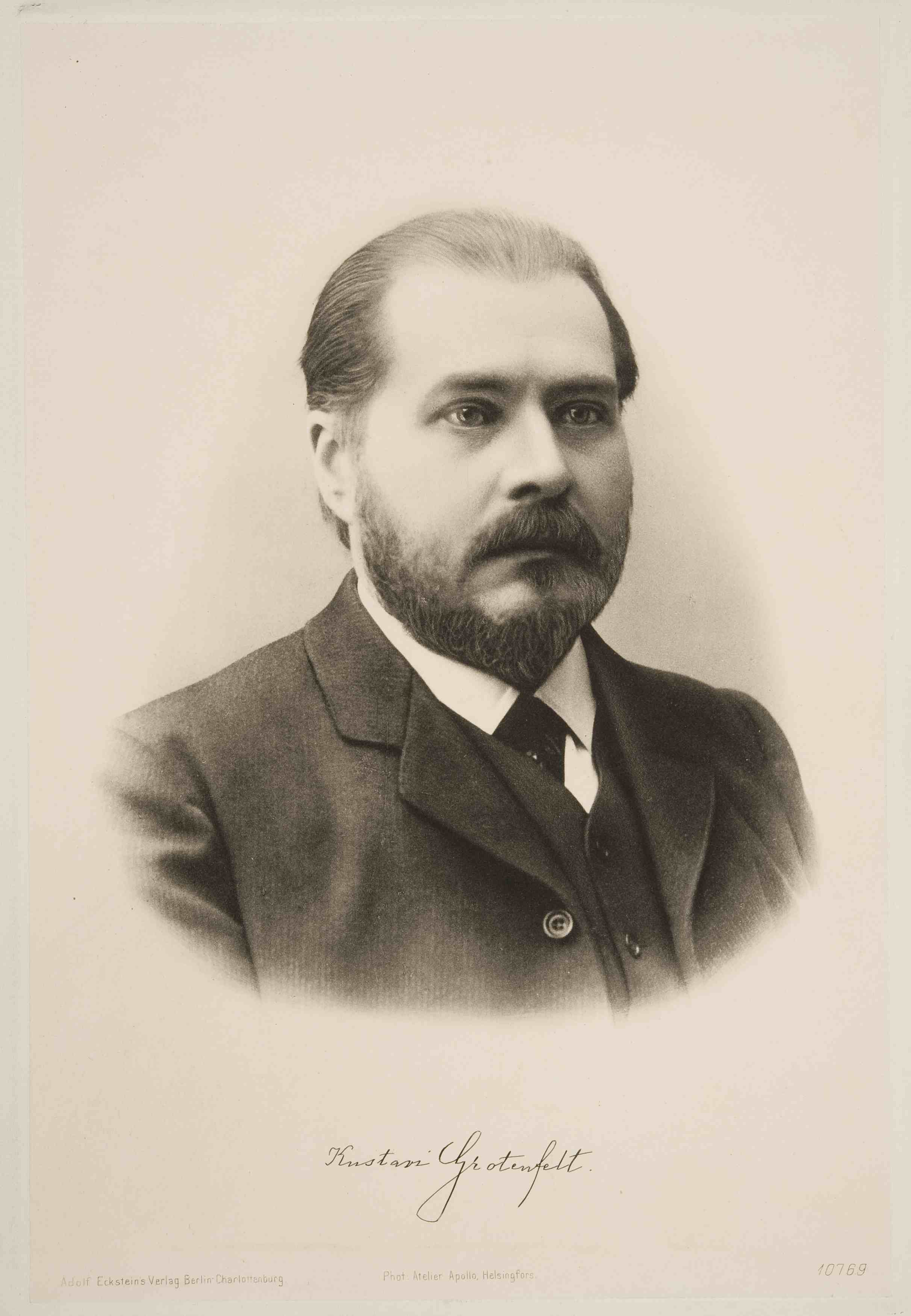
Kustavi Grotenfelt.

Kustavi (Gustaf) Grotenfelt (27 April 1861, Helsinki – 7 January 1928) was a Finnish historian, professor at the University of Helsinki and politician. He was a member of the Diet of Finland from 1888 to 1900 and from 1904 to 1906 and of the Parliament of Finland from 1908 to 1909. He represented the Young Finnish Party.
