= Political history of Finland =

This article deals with the political history of Finland from prehistoric times, through the Swedish rule (c.1200-1808), to the Russian rule (Grand Duchy of Finland, 1809-1917) and the time of independent Finland (1917-). In this context, Finland broadly refers to the geographical area in which the current Finnish state is located.

== Swedish rule ==
In 1362, Finland was granted the right to send a representative to the Swedish royal election. Under the 1634 Swedish-Finnish form of government and the first parliamentary order, Finland's four estates, the nobility, the clergy, the bourgeoisie and the peasants, sent their representatives to the Riksdag in Stockholm.

== Autonomy in the Russian Empire (1809–1917) ==
After the weakening of the Swedish Empire, it was no longer in a position to maintain its conquests of the Baltic Sea environment and had to cede the eastern parts to Russia as a result of wars. First, the so-called Old Finland, and with the Finnish War, the rest of Finland, which became a fully autonomous Grand Duchy to the Russian Empire in 1809. Finland had the status of a Grand Duchy from 1809 to 1917.

=== Critical changes ===
A significant change compared to the Swedish era was that Finland began to build its own central government. In 1809, the Finnish Senate was established to deal with Finland's internal affairs. It was to prepare and implement matters within the emperor's discretion, and in practice acted as a government. Under the Senate, a central government was formed, which in time developed into the state administration of independent Finland. The Secretary of State of Finland served in Saint Petersburg to present Finnish affairs to the Emperor. The establishment of these new administrative bodies was of great importance, and through them Finland was able to improve its own conditions when the taxes collected could be used directly for Finland's benefit. In 1812, the Russian Emperor Alexander I moved the capital of the Grand Duchy from Turku to Helsinki. In the same year, the so-called Old Finland, i.e. the area of Finland that Sweden lost to Russia in the 18th century, was restored to Finland. Vyborg, the most important city in Old Finland, grew into a major port and industrial city during the 19th century. In many ways, however, life continued unchanged from Swedish times.

Despite the development of the administration and the economy, the transition to Russian rule was not entirely favorable for Finland. For example, Finland was left out of the political development that began in Sweden towards a constitutional monarchy, party politics and, ultimately, democracy. The Diet did not begin to convene in Finland until the 1860s. Finland was also overshadowed by the strong development of freedom of expression in Sweden in the 19th century, the development of a free press, the strengthening of the rights and freedoms of individuals and the formation of civil society. The Russian Empire represented the opposites of the liberal ideals of the era to conservatism, monotony, and arbitrariness. The Finnish central government also adopted the methods of the Russian bureaucracy fluently and generally did not take a very positive view of the reforms.

=== Political struggles during autonomy ===
During the Russian rule, political activism gradually grew demanding more autonomy and eventually independence for Finland. However, several generations of struggle were needed before the Finnish nationalist movement realized its objectives. One form of activism was the underscoring of Finnish language, also at the expense of the primacy of Swedish language that was still widely spoken and the official language of the country. Numerous members of the Swedish-speaking community entered the campaign, adopting Finnish as their language and exchanging their Swedish family names for Finnish ones. Finnish journals were founded, and Finnish became an official language in 1863. By the end of the century, there was a slight majority of Finnish-speaking students at the University of Helsinki, and Finnish-speakers made up sizable portions of the professions.

Finland's first political parties grew out of the language struggle. Those advocating full rights for Finnish-speakers formed the so-called Fennoman group that by the 1890s had split into the Old Finns and the Young Finns, the former mainly concerned with the language question, the latter urging the introduction of political liberalism. The Swedish-speaking community formed a short-lived Liberal Party. As the century drew to a close and the Fennoman movement had achieved its principal goals, economic issues and relations with the tsarist empire came to dominate politics.

Over time Finland's modernizing economy encouraged the formation of social groups with specific, and sometimes opposing, interests. In addition to the Finnish movement's Old and Young Finns, other political organizations came into being. Because the existing political groups did not adequately represent labor's interests, a workers' party was formed at the end of the century. In 1903 it became the Finnish Social Democratic Party (Suomen Sosialidemokraattinen Puolue or SDP). At the same time labor was organizing itself, the farmers began a cooperative movement; in 1907 they formed the Agrarian Party (Maalaisliitto). The Swedish People's Party (Svenska Folkpartiet or SFP), also dating from this period, was formed to serve the entire Swedish-speaking population.

The Grand Duchy's relationship with St. Petersburg began to deteriorate in the 1890s. The nervousness of tsarist officials about Finnish loyalty in wartime prompted measures to bind Finland more closely to the empire. The campaign of "Russification" ended only with Finland's independence in 1917. In retrospect, the campaign can be seen as a failure, but for several decades it caused much turmoil within Finland, reaching its most extreme point with the assassination of the governor general in 1904. The first Russian revolution, that of 1905, allowed Finns to discard their antiquated Diet and to replace it with a unicameral legislature, the Eduskunta, elected through universal suffrage. Finland became the first European nation in which women had the franchise. The first national election, that of 1907, yielded Europe's largest social democratic parliamentary faction. In a single step, Finland went from being one of Europe's most politically backward countries to being one of its most advanced. Nonetheless, frequent dissolutions at the hands of the tsar permitted the Eduskunta to achieve little before independence.

=== Right to vote and the first parliamentary elections ===
In 1906, universal and equal suffrage was enacted in Finland for both women and men. Women were the first in the world to exercise their right to vote in the 1907 parliamentary elections. At that time, excluded from the right to vote were however, for example, persons receiving assistance for the disabled. Under the current constitution, the right to vote is universal and equal for everyone over the age of 18.

The first parliamentary elections were held on 15–16 March 1907. Until then, Finland lagged behind other European countries in terms of democracy, but now women were the first in Europe to receive both the right to vote and to stand for election, and the 19 women MPs elected to the new parliament were the world's first female MPs. At the end of the Diet, there were about 126,000 eligible voters in Finland, but in the first parliamentary elections there were 1,272,873, i.e. the parliamentary reform increased the electorate tenfold. Modern party institutions were also born in Finland with the right to vote in 1906.

=== Decreased autonomy ===
The reforms in Russia after the revolution of 1905 put an end to Finland's autonomy. With these reforms, Russia got a cabinet headed by the Prime Minister, through which all matters concerning Finland that went to the emperor passed through. Thus, it can be said that Finland's autonomy ended or was at most limited to those things that did not require the approval of the emperor and thus the Russian government.

Finland's autonomy experienced a new upswing after the February Revolution and the subsequent March manifesto, when part of the February Manifesto (1899), and the 1910 law on national legislation were repealed. However, in Finland there was a dispute over the supreme power, and in Russia the position of the provisional government was at least questionable.

== The time of independence (1917–present) ==
The Finnish Senate issued a declaration of independence on December 6, 1917, after Russia's second revolution in October 1917. The Council of People's Commissars of Soviet Russia, chaired by Lenin, recognized Finland's independence on December 31, 1917, and soon after that many other states followed. On January 28, 1918, a civil war broke out that ended in the victory of German-backed Whites against Bolsheviks-backed Reds. In the same year, the volunteers made some armed expeditions into Soviet Russia, including Karelia, and also Estonia. Peace with Soviet Russia was established in Tartu on November 14, 1920. During World War II, Finland fought against the Soviet Union in the Winter War of 1939–1940 and in the Continuation War of 1941–1944. After the ceasefire on September 4, 1944, the weapons had to be turned at the request of the Soviet Union against Germany in the Lapland War of 1944–1945.

=== Independence, civil war and the inter-war period ===
The second Russian revolution allowed Finland to break away from the Russian empire, and independence was declared on 6 December 1917. Within weeks, domestic political differences led to a Finnish Civil War that lasted until May 1918, when right-wing forces, with some German assistance, were able to claim victory. As a consequence, Finland began its existence as an independent state with a considerable segment of its people estranged from the holders of power, a circumstance that caused much strife in Finnish politics.

After right-wing dreams of a monarchy based on the coronation of a German prince as the king of Finland came crumbling down with the German defeat in the World War, a republic was formed. In mid-1919, Finns agreed on a new Constitution, one that constructed a modern parliamentary system of government from existing political institutions and traditions. The 200-seat unicameral parliament, the Eduskunta, was retained. A cabinet, the Council of State, was fashioned from the Senate of the tsarist period. A powerful presidency, derived, in part at least, from the office of governor general, was created and provided with a mixture of powers and duties that, in other countries, might be shared by such figures as king, president, and prime minister. Also included in the new governmental system was an independent judiciary. The powers of the three branches of government were controlled through an overlapping of powers, rather than a strict separation of powers.

Finland faced numerous political and economic difficulties in the interwar years, but it surmounted them better than many other European countries. Despite the instability of many short-lived governments, the political system held together during the first decades of independence. While other countries succumbed to right-wing forces, Finland had only a brush with fascism. Communist organizations were banned, and their representatives in the Eduskunta arrested, but the SDP was able to recover from wounds sustained during the Civil War and was returned to power. In 1937 the party formed the first of the so-called Red-Earth coalitions with the Agrarian League, the most common party combination of the next fifty years, one that brought together the parties representing the two largest social groups. The language problem was largely resolved by provisions in the Constitution that protected the rights of the Swedish-speaking minority.

=== World War II and the Cold War period ===
Finland's official foreign policy of neutrality in the interwar period could not offset the strategic importance of the country's territory to Nazi Germany and to the Soviet Union. The latter was convinced that it had a defensive need to ensure that Finland would not be used as an avenue for attack on its northwestern areas, especially on Leningrad. Moreover, Nazi Germany and the Soviet Union had agreed in the Molotov–Ribbentrop Pact to divide the countries of Eastern Europe between themselves. Accordingly, the Soviet Union launched an attack of Finland in November 1939. A valiant Finnish defense slowed the invaders, but in March 1940 the Winter War ended when Finland agreed to cede to the Soviets about 10 percent of Finnish territory and to permit a Soviet military base on Finnish soil. In June 1941 Finland joined Germany as cobelligerent in its attack on the Soviet Union. In what Finns call the Continuation War, Finland confined its military actions to areas near its prewar borders. In the fall of 1944, Finland made a separate peace with the Soviet Union, one that was conditional on its ceding territory, granting basing rights, agreeing to onerous reparation payments, and expelling German forces from its territory. Nevertheless, Finland succeeded in being one of only two belligerents in Europe that stayed never occupied, independent and with its democracy intact throughout the war, the other being the United Kingdom.

By the early 1950s, the patterns of postwar Finnish politics were established. No one group was dominant, but the Agrarian League held the presidency under Urho Kekkonen for a quarter century. Kekkonen first became president in 1956, and secured a place for the conservative Agrarian League as almost a permanent governing party until the late 1980s. In 1966 it changed its name to the Center Party (Keskustapuolue or Keskusta) in an attempt to appeal to a broader segment of the electorate, but it still was not successful in penetrating southern coastal Finland. Meanwhile, the Social Democratic Party historically the largest party, still remained strong but it was often riven by dissension. In addition, it had to share the leftist vote with the Communist Party of Finland (Suomen Kommunistinen Puolue or SKP). As a consequence, right-wing parties never had to face a united left. In the 1980s, the communists had severe problems adjusting to new social conditions, and they split into several warring groups. As a result, their movement had a marginal position in Finnish politics. The SFP, a moderate centrist party with liberal and conservative wings, had a slightly declining number of seats in the parliament Eduskunta, but its position in the middle of the political spectrum often made it indispensable for coalition governments. The National Coalition Party (Kansallinen Kokoomuspuolue or Kokoomus), rigidly conservative in the interwar period, gradually became more moderate and grew stronger, surpassing the Center Party in the number of parliamentary seats in 1979. Excluded from a role in government for decades, possibly because it had been more right-wing earlier, the Kokoomus participated in the government formed after the national elections of 1987, supplying the prime minister, Harri Holkeri. The Liberal Party of the postwar period was never strong, and it had a negligible role by the 1980s and eventually was dissolved.

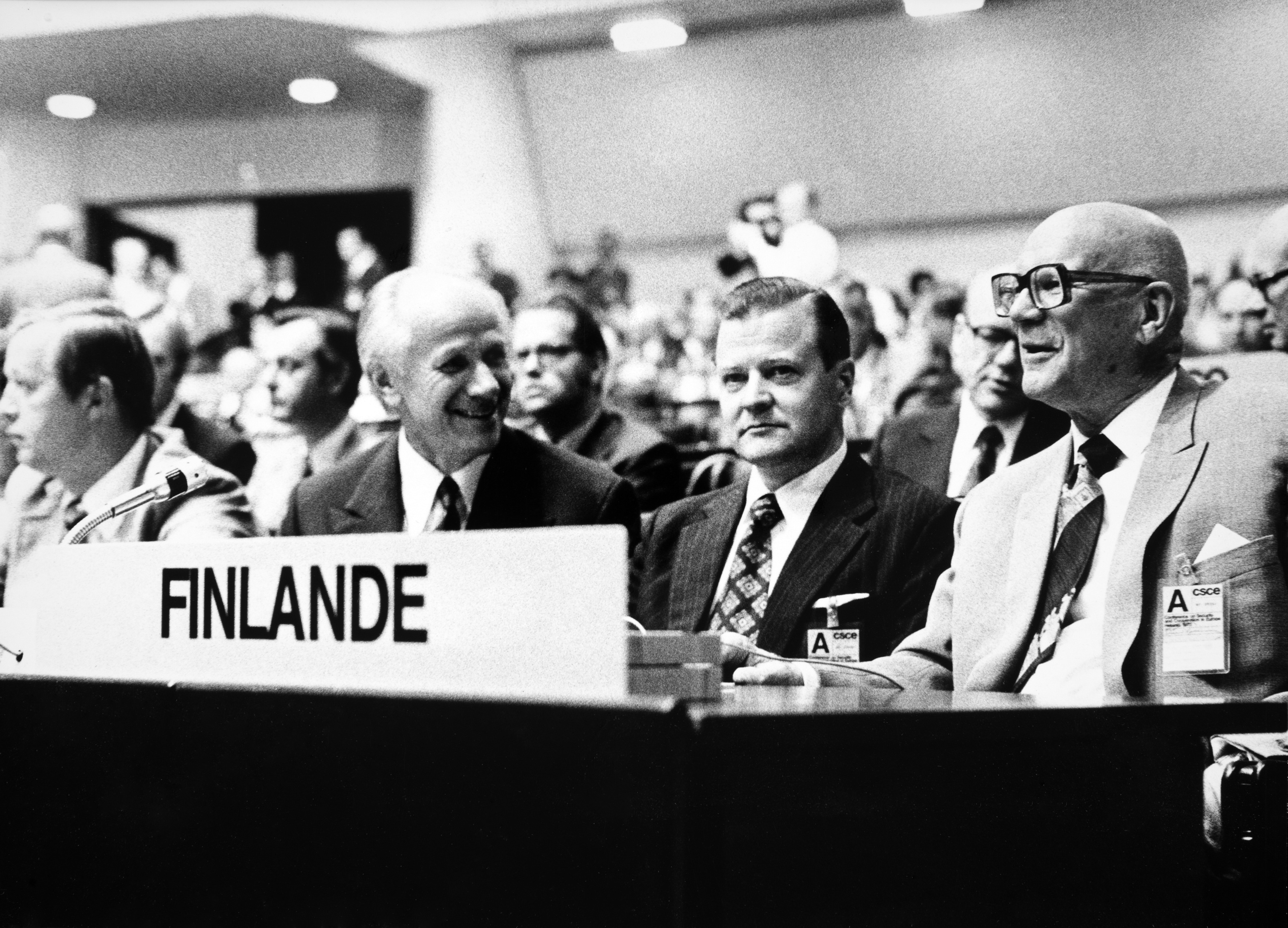
The Finnish delegation to the OSCE at the 1975 CSCE summit in Helsinki included both prime minister Kalevi Sorsa on the left and president Urho Kekkonen on the right. Sorsa came from the SDP which was the largest party for most of the post-war era but through the presidency the Center Party nevertheless held a dominant role.

A number of smaller parties, protest parties, and parties representing quite distinct groups filled out the list of about a dozen organizations that regularly vied for public office. Pensioners and activist Christians each had their own party, and environmentalists won several seats in the 1983 and the 1987 national elections — a movement which later grew to the modern Green Party during the 1990s. The most active of the protest parties was the Finnish Rural Party (Suomen Maaseudun Puolue or SMP), which managed to take votes from both the Center Party and leftist parties. It scored its first big successes in the 1970 national elections. Since then its electoral results have varied considerably. By the late 1980s, it seemed a spent force, but arose again as a populist right-wing party after changing its name to Perussuomalaiset or True Finns.

After the 1966 national elections President Kekkonen succeeded in forming a popular front coalition government that contained communists, socialists, and members of the Center Party. Although this government lasted only two years and was succeeded for another decade by short-lived coalition and caretaker civil service governments, it was the beginning of what Finns call the politics of consensus. By the 1980s, consensus politics had become so dominant that some observers claimed that Finnish politics, long so bitter and contentious, had become the most boring in Western Europe. Although the larger parties differed on specific issues, and personal rivalries could be poisonous, there was broad agreement about domestic and foreign policy. The cabinet put in place after the 1983 elections, consisting mainly of social democrats and members of the Center Party, completed its whole term of office, the first government to do so in the postwar period. This ushered in an era of relatively long lasting governments where leadership changes took place mainly through regular elections.

A foundation of the politics of consensus was the success of the system of broad incomes agreements that has characterized Finland's employee-employer relations in recent decades. The first of these, the Liinamaa Agreement, dated from 1968. By the 1980s, the process was so regular as to seem institutionalized. With about 80 percent of the work force as members, unions negotiated incomes agreements with employers' organizations. The government often helped in the talks and subsequently proposed legislation embodying social welfare measures or financial measures that underpinned the agreements. The process was successful at increasing labor peace in a country that had been racked by strikes for the first decades after World War II. Although there were complaints that the agreements bypassed political channels or excluded minority opinion, the obvious prosperity they had helped bring about made the incomes policy system and the politics of consensus highly popular.

=== Integration to the West ===
In 1982, Mauno Koivisto, the successor of long-term president Urho Kekkonen, was elected president, promising to reduce the powers of the president and increase those of the prime minister.

The convergence of Finland and the European Community began in the autumn of 1989 with the decision to join the European Economic Area (EEA) in 1994.

Following a positive vote in Parliament, Finland's application for EC membership was submitted on 18 March 1992, and membership negotiations began on 1 February 1993 at the same time as with Sweden and Austria.

Finland joined the European Union in 1995. In 2002, the euro replaced the markka as Finland's official currency.

In 2000, Finland's first female president, Tarja Halonen, took office. The former President of Finland, Martti Ahtisaari, received the Nobel Peace Prize in 2008. President Sauli Niinistö held office since 2012 until 2024.

After almost 30 years of close partnership with NATO, Finland joined the Alliance on 4 April 2023. Finland's partnership with NATO was historically based on its policy of military non-alignment, which changed following Russia's full-scale invasion of Ukraine in February 2022. On 1 March 2024, Alexander Stubb, a staunch supporter of NATO, was sworn in as Finland’s new president.

== Bibliography ==
- Jussila, Osmo & Hentilä, Seppo & Nevakivi, Jukka (2009). Suomen poliittinen historia 1809–2009. Helsinki: WSOY Oppimateriaalit.
- Kuisma, Markku (2009). Suomen poliittinen taloushistoria 1000–2000. Helsinki: Siltala.
- Pernaa, Ville & Niemi, Mari K. (toim.) (2005). Suomalaisen yhteiskunnan poliittinen historia. Helsinki: Edita.
- Visuri, Pekka (2006). Suomi kylmässä sodassa. Helsingissä: Otava.
