= Carl Fredrik Meinander =

Finnish archaeologist

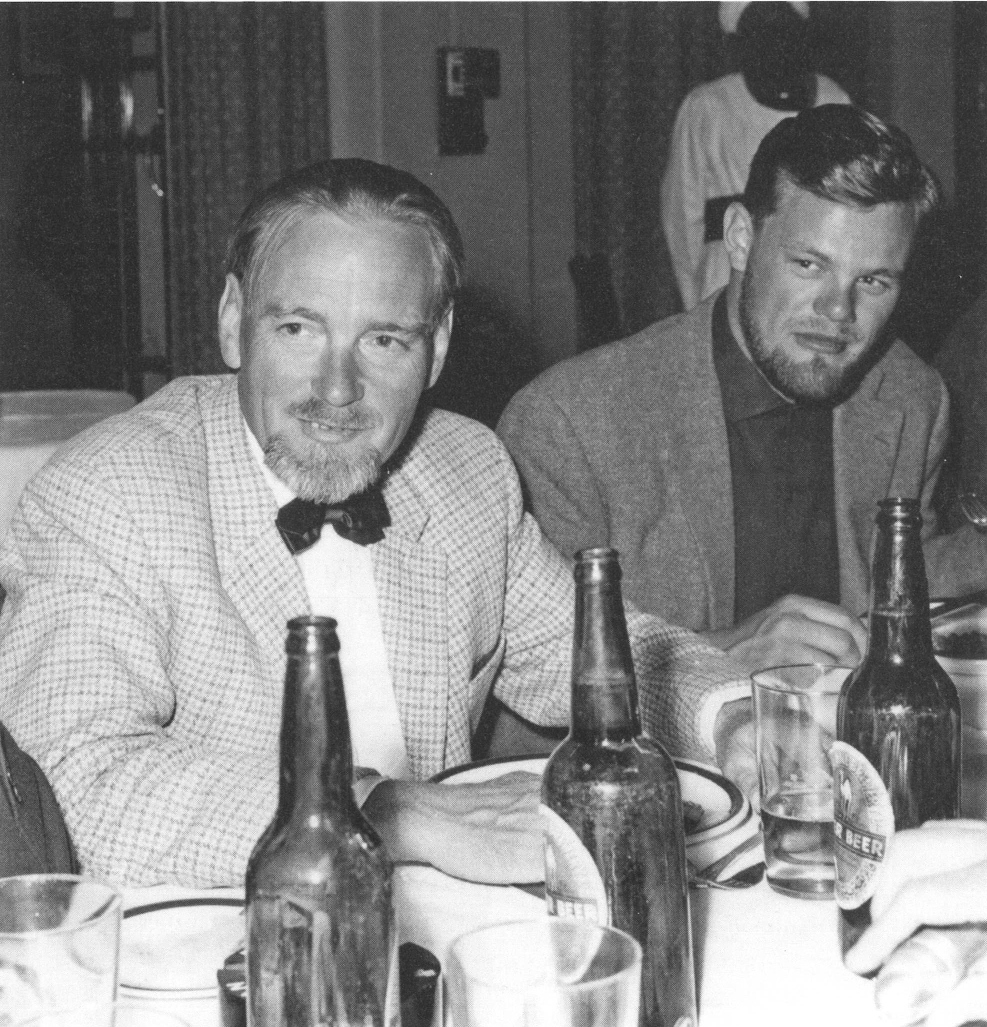
- C. F. Meinander (to the left) with his Danish colleague Hans Jørgen Madsen in 1961.
- Born: Carl Fredrik Waldemar Meinander; 6 October 1916; Helsinki, Finland
- Died: 23 August 2004 (aged 87); Helsinki, Finland
- Education: University of Helsinki
- Predecessor: Ella Kivikoski
- Successor: Ari Siiriäinen
- Children: Henrik Meinander
- Scientific career
- Fields: Archaeologist
- Workplaces: University of Helsinki
- Thesis: Die Bronzezeit in Finnland (1954)

Carl Fredrik Waldemar Meinander (October 6, 1916 Helsinki – August 23, 2004 Helsinki) was a Finnish archaeologist and professor of Finnish and Scandinavian archaeology at University of Helsinki in Finland. His son is Professor Henrik Meinander.

== Books ==
- Några forngravar i Laihela (1943)
- De österbottniska tvärlåsspännena (1949)
- Esihistoria. Etelä-Pohjanmaan historia I (1950)
- Die Bronzezeit in Finnland (1954)
- Die Kiukaiskultur (1954)
- Kolsvidja (1957)
- Smikärr (1962)
- Kommentarer till spånpålens historia (1962)
- Skifferknivar med djurskaft (1964)
- Dåvits (1969)
- Myrsbacka (1984)
- Radiokarbondateringar till Finlands stenålder (1971)
- Svenska Österbottens historia, I
- Om introduktion av sädesodling i Finland
