= Archaeological Society of Finland =

Finnish archeological society

- Founded: 1982
- Purpose: Archaeology
- Location: Helsinki, Finland
- Region served: Finland
- Website: www.sarks.fi

The Archaeological Society of Finland (Finnish: Suomen arkeologinen seura) is a scholarly society for the purpose of promoting archaeological research in Finland.

The founding meeting of the society was held on October 9, 1982, at the Department of Archaeology of the University of Helsinki, where Professor Unto Salo from the University of Turku was elected as the society's first chairperson. The current chairperson of the society is Teemu Väisänen.

The society publishes three peer-reviewed book series; Muinaistutkija, Fennoscandia archaeologica and Monographs of the Archaeological Society of Finland. In addition, the society organizes annual Archaeology Days, during which archaeologists from across Finland gather to hear about and discuss current topics and research related to their field. Between 2001 and 2015, the society published the contents of the presentations given at the event as collections of articles in a publication series titled Arkeologipäivät. In 2012, the society was involved in organizing the 18th EAA conference in Helsinki.

In addition to promoting research, the society improves archaeologists' working conditions, for example by drafting an equality and non-discrimination plan as well as ethical principles. The society awards the Populaari-ydin recognition for the popularization of archaeology

In 2024, the society began publishing a new podcast series focused on archaeology.

== Sources ==
- Mikkola, Terhi (2014), "Tieteelliset seurat", Johdatus arkeologiaan, Gaudeamus, pp. 445–450
